= List of Polish national, patriotic and socialist songs =

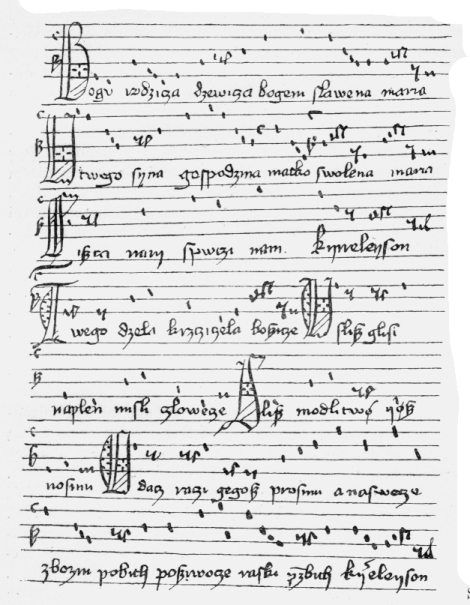
Sheet music for Bogurodzica from 1407

This is a list of Polish national and patriotic songs.

Bogurodzica (Mother of God)
A religious hymn to the Virgin Mary dating back to between 10th and 13th centuries. It was a de facto national anthem of medieval Poland, sung at royal coronations and on battlefields, including the Battle of Grunwald in 1410 and the Battle of Varna in 1444.

Gaude Mater Polonia (Rejoice, Mother Poland)
A hymn written in the 13th century by Wincenty of Kielcza. It was penned in Medieval Latin to the melody of a Gregorian chant, O salutaris Hostia. The hymn celebrates the canonization of Saint Stanislaus of Szczepanów, bishop of Kraków and a patron saint of Poland. In the Middle Ages, it was chanted on special occasions and after victorious battles. Today, it is performed at university ceremonies.

Daj nam Boże doczekać tej pory, by do ataku nachylić propory (Let Us, O God, Live to Lower Our Pennons for Attack)
Soldiers' song which originated in Prince Józef Poniatowski's division and gained some popularity at the end of the 18th century.

Hymn do miłości Ojczyzny (O Sacred Love of the Beloved Country)
Written in 1774 by Prince-Bishop Ignacy Krasicki for King Stanisław August Poniatowski's Corps of Cadets, it became in the latter's reign an unofficial national anthem of Poland. The lyrics convey the idea that love of Country gives meaning to poverty, wounds and death.

Mazurek Dąbrowskiego (Dąbrowski's Mazurka, or Poland Is Not Yet Lost)
Soldiers' song written in 1797 by Gen. Józef Wybicki in praise of Gen. Jan Henryk Dąbrowski, commander of the Polish Legions serving in Italy under Napoleon Bonaparte. In 1926 it became the official national anthem of Poland.

Boże, coś Polskę
(from the first lines "Boże! Coś Polskę przez tak liczne wieki / Otaczał blaskiem potęgi i chwały...", "Lord! Who for so many ages enclosed Poland with the light of power and glory...")
Originally written in 1816 by Alojzy Feliński as Pieśń narodowa na pomyślność Króla (National Song to the King's Well-being). It was the official anthem of the Congress Kingdom of Poland reigned over by Russian emperors who were ex officio kings of Poland. Initially unpopular, it evolved in the early 1860s into an important religious and patriotic hymn. The line from the refrain, which originally begged "Save, Oh Lord, our King", was substituted with "Return us, Oh Lord, our free Fatherland" while the melody was simplified and made close to the Marian hymn. The resulting modern version has been sung in Polish churches ever since, with the final verse alternating between "Return..." and "Bless, Oh Lord, our free Fatherland", depending on Poland's political situation.

Warszawianka (The Song of Warsaw, 1831)
Originally written in 1831 by Casimir Delavigne in French as La Varsovienne, with melody composed by Karol Kurpiński. The song praised the November Uprising of 1830 and, translated into Polish by Karol Sienkiewicz, it became the most popular song of the uprising and is still performed by Polish military bands today.

Gdy naród do boju (When the Nation Fights)
A patriotic socialist song written in 1835 by Gustaw Ehrenberg to the melody of an aria from Wolfgang Amadeus Mozart's opera Don Juan. The lyrics denounce the loyalist attitude of Polish magnates, noblemen and clergy during the failed November Uprising of 1830. The song was popular with members of Polish socialist and agrarian movements and became an anthem of the Polish People's Army during World War II.

Warszawianka (The Song of Warsaw or Whirlwinds of Danger, 1905)
A revolutionary song written in 1879 by socialist Wacław Święcicki imprisoned in the Warsaw Citadel. First sung in the streets of Warsaw in 1885, it became particularly popular during the Revolution of 1905. Its popularity spread to Russia proper and from there to Germany, France and Spain, where it became known as A las barricadas (To the Barricades), the anarchist anthem of the Spanish Civil War.

Rota (The oath) (1908)
Great anthem against German oppression and policy of germanisation, written by Maria Konopnicka, music composed 1910 by Feliks Nowowiejski, first publicly sung during patriotic demonstration July 15, 1910, in Kraków on the 500th anniversary of Polish victory in Battle of Grunwald. Special modified version of Rota has been prepared against Soviet Union after WWII when Poland became dependent.

Marsz Pierwszej Brygady (March of the First Brigade)
Soldiers' song written in 1917 by Andrzej Hałaciński and Tadeusz Biernacki to the melody of Marsz Kielecki (Kielce March) composed by Andrzej Brzuchal-Sikorski in 1905. It was originally sung by soldiers of the First Brigade of the Polish Legions commanded by Józef Piłsudski during World War I. During Piłsudski's military dictatorship following the coup of May 1926, the song was an unofficial national anthem of Poland. In 2007, it became the official anthem of the Polish Armed Forces.

Morze, nasze morze (The Sea, Our Sea)
Written at the turn of the 1930s by Adam Kowalski to praise the sailors of Poland's nascent navy and to celebrate the construction of Gdynia, a new port city on the Baltic Sea. It is now the official anthem of the Polish Navy.

Czerwone maki na Monte Cassino (Red Poppies on Monte Cassino)
A military song written by Feliks Konarski and composed by Alfred Schultz in 1944 to commemorate Polish soldiers fallen in the Battle of Monte Cassino earlier that year.

Mury (Walls)
A revolutionary song written in 1978 by Jacek Kaczmarski to the melody of Lluís Llach's Catalan song L'Estaca. It became an unofficial anthem of the Solidarity movement in the 1980s.
