= Bogurodzica =

Medieval Polish Catholic hymn to Mary

- Hymn
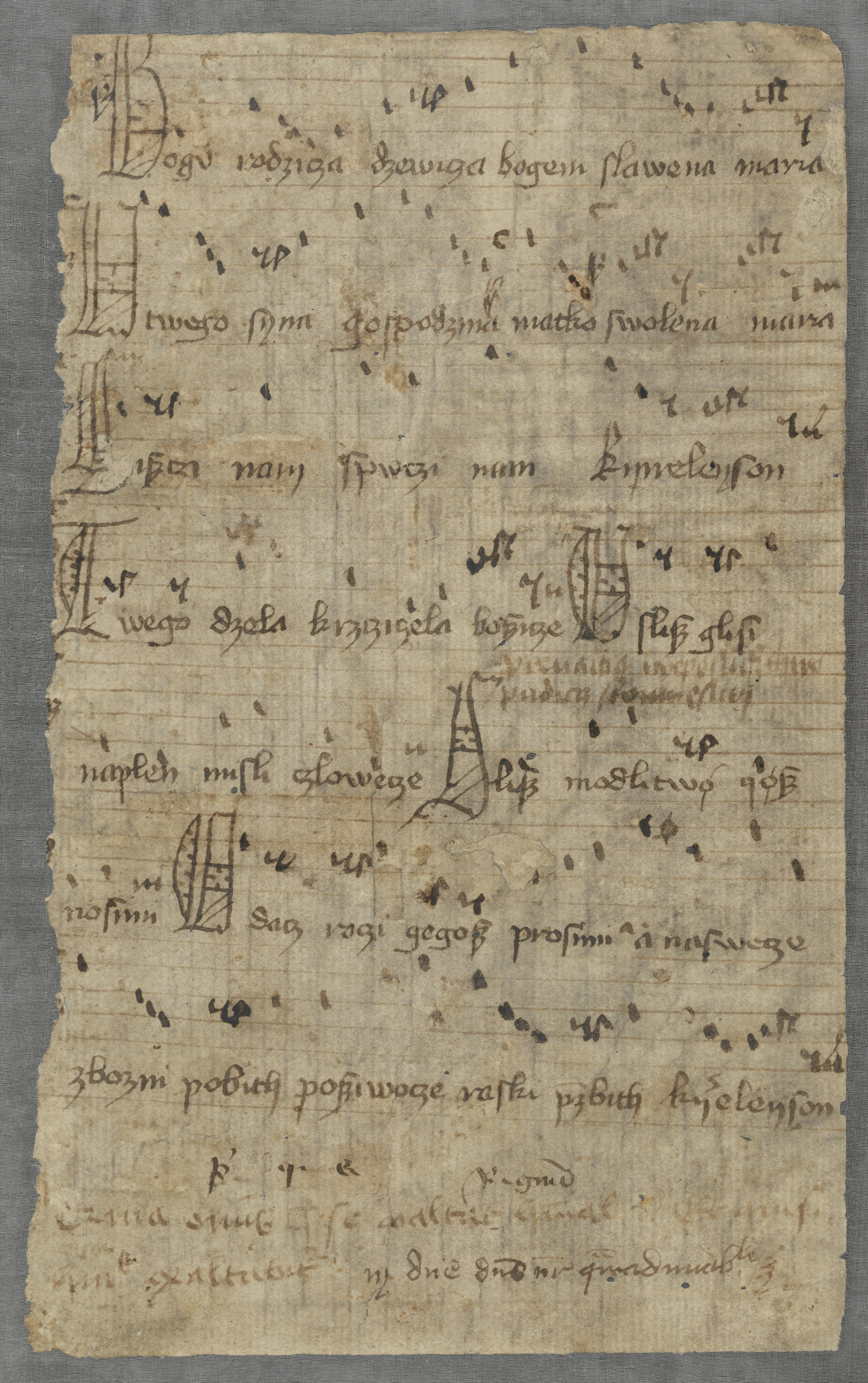
- Bogurodzica manuscript, 1407
- Written: between the 10th and 13th centuries
- Text: unknown
- Language: Polish

Bogurodzica performed by Collegium Vocale Bydgoszcz

Bogurodzica (Polish pronunciation: [bɔɡurɔˈd͡ʑit͡sa], calque of the Greek term Theotokos), in English known as the Mother of God, is a medieval Christian hymn composed sometime between the 10th and 13th centuries in Poland. It is believed to be the oldest religious hymn or patriotic anthem in the Polish language, which was traditionally sung in Old Polish with the Ancient Greek phrase Kyrie eleison lit. 'Lord, have mercy'. While its origin is not entirely clear, several scholars agree that Saint Adalbert of Prague is the likely author. Polish knights chanted Bogurodzica prior to their engagement at the Battle of Grunwald and it also accompanied the coronation ceremonies of the first Jagiellonian kings.

== History ==
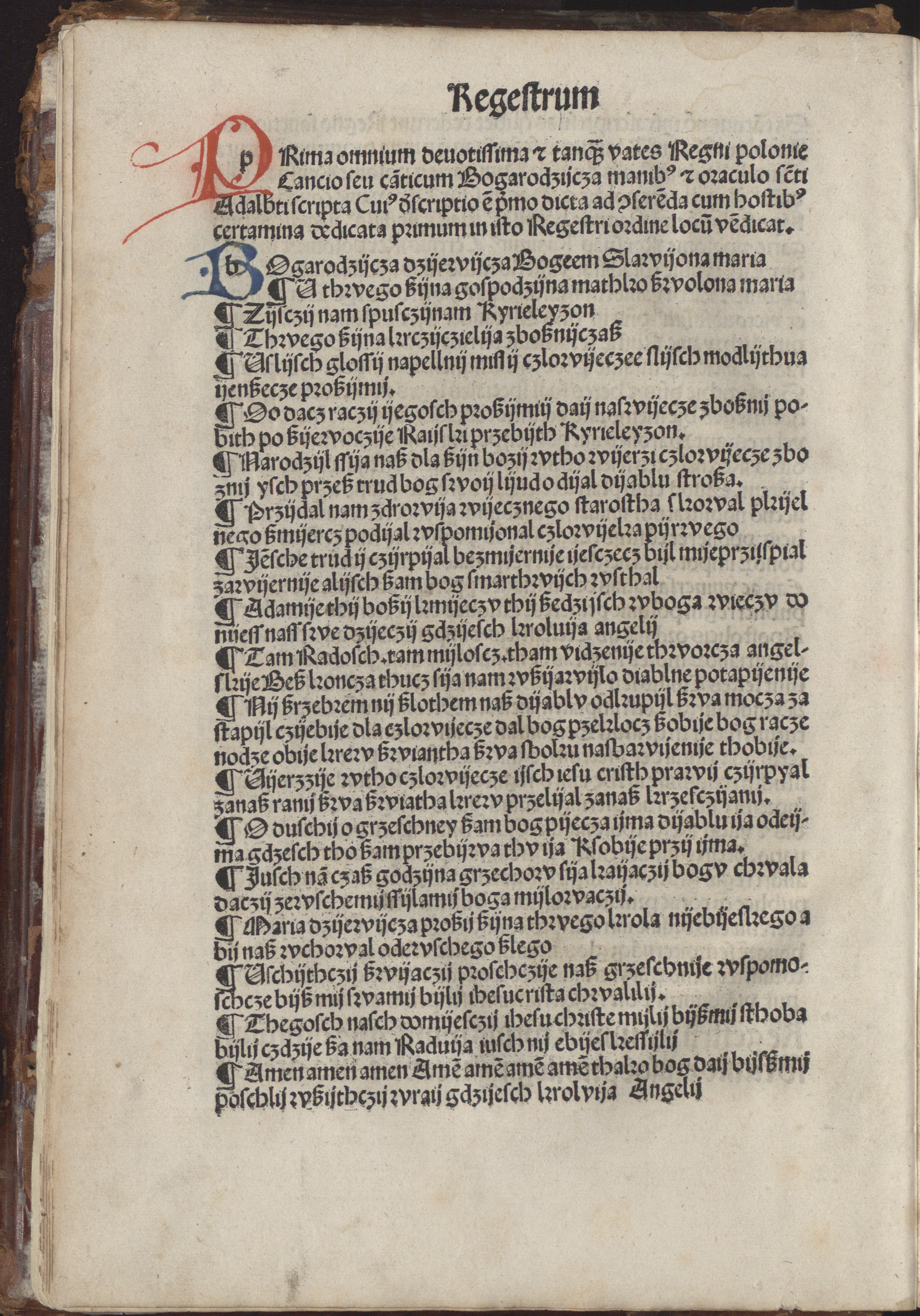
Bogurodzica (1506)

It was recorded in writing at the beginning of the 15th century. Two records preserved till today date back to that time:

1. the Kcynia record including two initial stanzas together with musical notation;
2. the Kraków record covering thirteen stanzas without notes.

Other records date back to the second half of the fifteenth century, the turn of the fifteenth and sixteenth centuries and to the beginning of the 16th century. In 1509, the hymn was printed in Kraków and incorporated into the "Statutes of Bishop Jan Łaski".

The origin of the song is not clear, although Saint Adalbert is widely believed to be its author or contributor. It heavily reflected Latin and Christian liturgy as a whole. The two initial stanzas were created first - possibly in the middle or at the end of the thirteenth century, or possibly at the very beginning of the fourteenth century.

Bogurodzica is a prayer hymn whose first stanza contains an invocation to Christ through the intercession of Mary. It begins with an apostrophe to her - to the Mother of Christ, the Virgin, praised by God, the chosen one. After the apostrophe, there is an appeal to Mary to win favour for people from her Son.

The second stanza begins with a direct addresses to Christ (called God's Son) - with an invocation to the Baptism of Christ. The prayer closing this stanza contains a request that Christ give people a blissful stay on Earth and, after death, everlasting existence in heaven. The subsequent stanzas develop various motifs such as Easter, the Passion of Jesus and litany - with invocations to the saints.

Bogurodzica was initially associated with religious mass and procession, however, by the fifteenth century it became a war hymn and a battle cry. According to Jan Długosz, historian and author of Annales seu Cronicae incliti Regni Poloniae, Bogurodzica was sung at Grunwald in 1410 as well as before other notable battles in the subsequent years. It also accompanied the coronation of Władysław III of Poland. Długosz defined the tune as "carmen patrium" – 'the hymn of the fatherland'. In spite of this, the hymn lost its significance over the upcoming centuries to new patriotic anthems, notably "Rota" and "Poland Is Not Yet Lost".

From May 2024, the third oldest manuscript version of the song (1456) is presented at a permanent exhibition in the Palace of the Commonwealth in Warsaw.

== Lyrics ==
Old Polish
Bogurodzica dziewica, Bogiem sławiena Maryja!
U twego syna Gospodzina Matko zwolena, Maryja,
Zyszczy nam, spuści nam!
Kyrie eleison!

Twego dziela Krzciciela, bożycze,
Usłysz głosy, napełń myśli człowiecze!
Słysz modlitwę, jąż nosimy,
A dać raczy, jegoż prosimy:
A na świecie zbożny pobyt,
Po żywocie rajski przebyt!
Kyrie eleison!

English
Mother of God, Virgin, God-famed Mary!
Ask Thy Son, our Lord, God-named Mary,
To have mercy upon us and hand it over to us!
Kyrie eleison! (in Greek)

Son of God, for Thy Baptist's sake,
Hear the voices, fulfill the pleas we make!
Listen to the prayer we say,
For what we ask, give us today:
Life on earth free of vice;
After life: paradise!
Kyrie eleison!

== Quotations in modern music ==
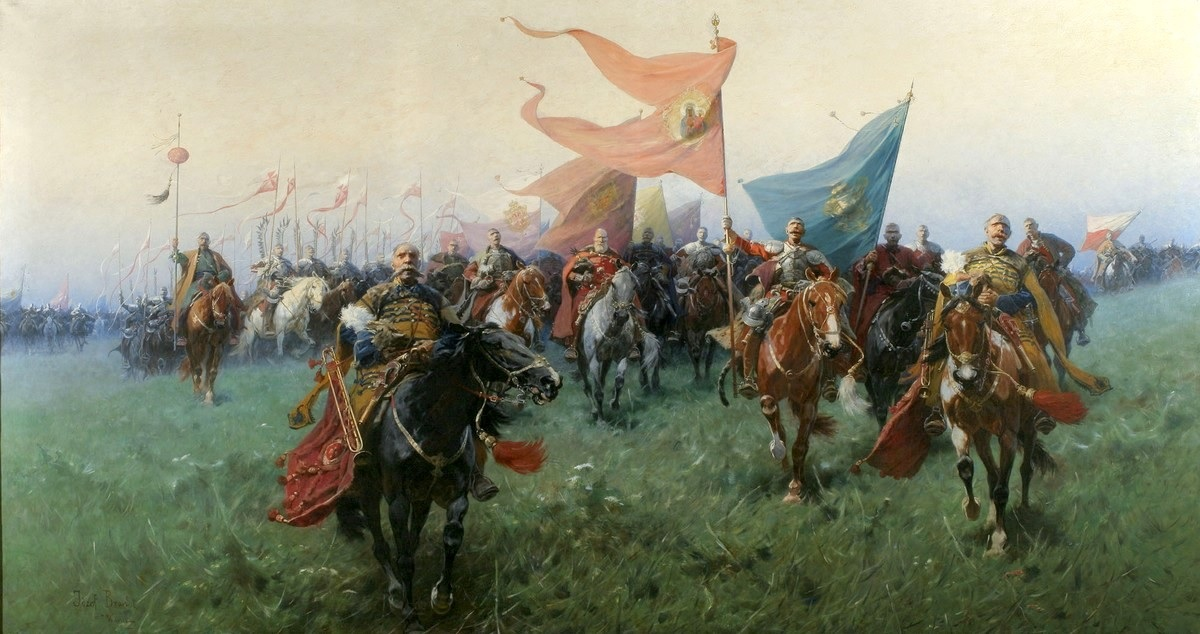
Bogurodzica, by Józef Brandt (1909)

- Andrzej Panufnik - Sinfonia sacra (1963)
- Wojciech Kilar - Bogurodzica for choir and orchestra (1975)
- Krzysztof Meyer - Symfony No. 6 "Polish" (1982)
- Chłopomania - Bogurodzica (from Ludomania) (2008)
- Anna Witczak Czerniawska & Maleo Reggae Rockers feat Mazzoll - Bogurodzica (2015),
- Henryk Górecki - a "motto" based on the incipit of Bogurodzica included in Songs of Joy and Rhythm (version of 1960); Symphony no. 1 (1959); Miserere, op. 44, (1981); and the Harpsichord Concerto, op. 40 (1980; first movement).

== See also ==
- Poland Is Not Yet Lost
- Boże, coś Polskę
- Warszawianka (1831)
- Gaude Mater Polonia
- Hospodine, pomiluj ny

== Bibliography ==
- Bogurodzica. Oprac. J. Woronczak, wstęp językoznawczy E. Ostrowska, oprac. muzykologiczne H. Feicht, Wrocław 1962. Biblioteka Pisarzów Polskich.
- J.Birkenmajer, Bogurodzica Dziewica. Analiza tekstu, treści i formy, Lwów 1937.
- S.Urbańczyk, "Bogurodzica". Problemy czasu powstania i tła kulturalnego, w: Prace z dziejów języka polskiego, Wrocław 1979.
- A.Czyż, Bogurodzica - między Wschodem i Zachodem. Kilka myśli o duchowej jedności Europy, w: Światło i słowo. Egzystencjalne czytanie tekstów dawnych, Warszawa 1995.
- W. Wydra, Dlaczego pod Grunwaldem śpiewano "Bogurodzicę"? Trzy rozdziały o najdawniejszych polskich pieśniach religijnych, Poznań, Wydawnictwo Poznańskie Studia Polonistyczne, 2000.
