= Gaude Mater Polonia =

Medieval Polish hymn

English: 'Rejoice, oh Mother Poland'
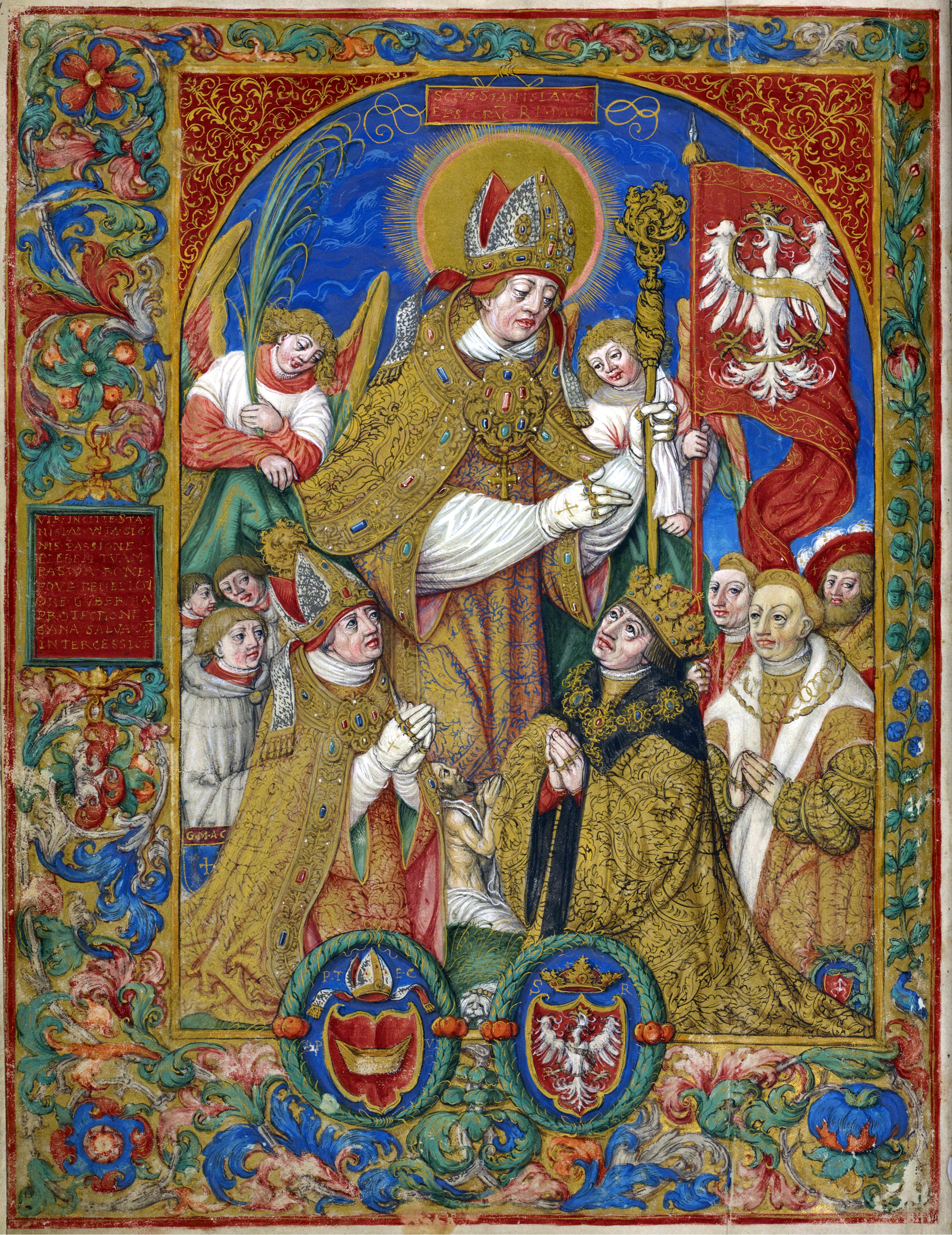
- A miniature depicting Saint Stanislaus of Szczepanów, painted by Stanisław Samostrzelnik (Stanislaus Claratumbensis).
- Royal Anthem of Polish–Lithuanian Commonwealth
- Lyrics: Vincent of Kielcza, 1253
- Published: 8 May 1254
- Succeeded by: Poland Is Not Yet Lost

Audio sample
- "Gaude Mater Polonia" performed by Educatus mixed chorus of Pedagogical University of Krakow conducted by Adam Korzeniowski: file; help

Gaude Mater Polonia (Note: Medieval Latin for 'Rejoice, O Mother Poland', Ecclesiastical Latin: [ˈɡau̯dɛ ˈmaːtɛr pɔˈlɔːni.a]; Polish: Raduj się, matko Polsko, [ˈraduj ɕɛ̃ ˈmatkɔ ˈpɔlskɔ]) was one of the most significant medieval Polish hymns, written in Latin between the 13th and the 14th century to commemorate Saint Stanislaus, Bishop of Kraków. Polish knights sang and chanted the hymn after victory in battle, presumably to one of the Gregorian melodies associated with the Eucharistic psalm O Salutaris Hostia on which it is based. It is widely considered a historical, national anthem of the Kingdom of Poland and the Polish–Lithuanian Commonwealth.

== History ==
The anthem came to existence in 1253, along with the canonization of Stanislaus of Szczepanów on 8 September in Assisi; Stanislaus died a martyr's death on 11 April 1079. The author of the anthem is the first Polish composer in music history known by name, the poet Vincent of Kielcza, OP, a Cracovian canon and chaplain of Bishop Iwo Odrowąż. For a long time he was mistakenly called Vincent of Kielce, and he wrote the hymn to commemorate the canonization of Saint Stanislaus. It is assumed that the first performance of the piece took place on 8 May 1254, during the canonization ceremonies in Kraków.

Vincent wrote The History of St. Stanislas in Latin (Dies adest celebris). The poet decided to describe the life and accomplishments of Bishop Stanislaus and the miracles which occurred after his death, which people had been speaking of for almost two centuries. The legend says that after the body of St. Stanislaus was dismembered, the parts miraculously regrouped and formed the whole body again, while eagles circled in the sky. This was an allegory of the current state of Poland in those years: split into pieces but hoping to grow back together to form a country again. The uniting of Poland occurred a couple years after the canonization of St. Stanislaus under the rule of King Ladislaus the Short.

Within the History, which contained sung elements, the part Gaude, Mater Polonia was after a time recognised as an independent piece. Throughout the years, it eventually became the royal anthem under the Piast dynasty. The anthem became a part of Polish tradition and history, being sung during the coronation of the Polish monarch, royal marriages, as well as during celebrations of the 1683 victory of John III Sobieski in Vienna. Kings and military commanders gave thanks for their successes by singing the anthem after battle. The melody has been popular for almost 750 years, in which it has since become a key element of Polish culture. Today it is sung at most universities for the inauguration of the academic year as well as during important national holidays.

== Music ==
From a musical view, Gaude, Mater Polonia holds a unique melodic line that does not resemble any known in other Latin anthems. Its melody has a symmetrical structure, of an arc or bow type, making it a story-type melody that is characteristic of folk songs. It has an overjoyed but proud character. Some sources say that the inspiration for the melody was the anthem to Saint Dominic, Gaude Mater Ecclesia ("Rejoice, oh Mother Church"), having its roots with Italian Dominicans.

It is most commonly sung in the arrangement of Teofil Tomasz Klonowski (1805–1876). It is written for a four-voice, mixed choir, with the melody being captured in a four measure phrase. Although it has ceased to be used as an anthem, it often accompanies ceremonies of national and religious importance.

== Lyrics ==
Gaude Mater Polonia
O ciesz się, Matko-Polsko

Latin	Polish	English
Gaude, mater Polonia,	O ciesz się, Matko-Polsko, w sławne	Rejoice, oh Mother Poland
prole fæcunda nobili.	Potomstwo płodna! Króla królów	Rich in noble offspring,
Summi Regis magnalia	I najwyższego Pana wielkość	To the Highest King render
laude frequenta vigili.	Uwielbiaj chwałą przynależną.	Worship with incessant praise.
Cuius benigna gratia	Albowiem z Jego łaskawości	For by His benign grace
Stanislai Pontificis	Biskupa Stanisława męki	Bishop Stanislaus' torments,
passionis insignia	Niezmierne, jakie on wycierpiał,	so great, which he had suffered
signis fulgent mirificis.	Jaśnieją cudownymi znaki.	Shine with marvelous signs.
Hic certans pro iustitia,	Potykał się za sprawiedliwość,	Here contending for justice,
Regis non-cedit furiæ:	Przed gniewem króla nie ustąpił:	He did not yield before the anger of the king:
Stat pro plebis iniuria	I staje żołnierz Chrystusowy	And stands the soldier of Christ,
Christi miles in acie.	Za krzywdę ludu sam do walki.	Alone to fight for the injury of the people.
Tyranni truculentiam,	Ponieważ stale wypominał	Because he constantly reminded
Qui dum constanter arguit,	On okrucieństwo tyranowi,	The tyrant of his brutality,
Martyrii victoriam	Koronę zdobył męczennika,	He gained the crown of a martyr,
Membratim cæsus meruit.	Padł posiekany na kawałki.	And fell quartered into pieces.
Novum pandit miraculum	Niebiosa nowy cud zdziałały,	The Heavens wrought a new miracle,
Splendor in sancto ceritus,	Bo mocą swą Niebieski Lekarz	For the Celestial Physician by His power
Redintegrat corpusculum	Poćwiartowane jego ciało	The martyr's quartered body
Sparsum cælestis medicus.	Przedziwne znowu w jedno złączył.	Once more miraculously joined into whole.
Sic Stanislaus pontifex	Tak to Stanisław biskup przeszedł	Thus did bishop Stanislaus enter
Transit ad caeli curiam,	W przybytki Króla niebieskiego,	Into the Court of the Celestial King,
Ut apud Deum opifex	Aby u Boga Stworzyciela	That he may at God, the Creator's, side
Nobis imploret veniam.	Nam wyjednać przebaczenie.	Beg forgiveness for us.
Poscentes eius merita,	Gdy kto dla zasług jego prosi,	When whosoever by his merits pleads,
Salutis dona referunt:	Wnet otrzymuje zbawcze dary:	Soon receives the saving gifts:
Morte præventi subita	Ci, co pomarli nagłą śmiercią,	Those who died a sudden death,
Ad vitae potum redeunt.	Do życia znowu powracają.	To life return once more.
Cuius ad tactum anuli	Choroby wszelkie pod dotknięciem	All diseases at the touch
Morbi fugantur turgidi:	Pierścienia jego uciekają:	Of his ring flee:
Ad locum sancti tumuli	Przy jego świętym grobie zdrowie	By his holy grace health
Multi curantur languidi.	Niemocnych wielu odzyskuje.	Is gained by the feeble.
Surdis auditus redditur,	Słuch głuchym bywa przywrócony,	Hearing returns to the mute,
Claudis gressus officum,	A chromy kroki stawia raźno,	While the lame boldly takes steps,
Mutorum lingua solvitur	Niemowom język się rozwiązał,	The tongues of the mutes are untied,
Et fugatur daemonium.	W popłochu szatan precz ucieka.	Satan flees in haste far away.
Ergo, felix Cracovia,	A przeto szczęsny ty, Krakowie,	Thus, you, o happy Cracow,
Sacro dotata corpore	Uposażony świętym ciałem,	Armed with saintly body,
Deum, qui fecit omnia,	Błogosław po wsze czasy Boga,	Bless for all eternity God,
Benedic omni tempore.	Który z niczego wszystko stworzył.	Who wrought all from naught.
Sit Trinitati gloria,	Niech Trójcy Przenajświętszej zabrzmi	May to Most Holy Trinity sound
Laus, honor, iubilatio:	Cześć, chwała, sława, uwielbienie,	Praise, glory, celebration, adoration,
De Martyris victoria	A nam tryumfy męczennika	And let the triumphs of the martyr
Sit nobis exsultatio.	Niech wyjednają radość wieczną.	Gain for us eternal bliss.
Amen	Amen	Amen

== See also ==
- Poland Is Not Yet Lost (Mazurek Dąbrowskiego)
- Boże, coś Polskę
- Warszawianka (1831)
- Bogurodzica
- Polish music
- Szlachta
