= Boże, coś Polskę =

Polish religious and patriotic song

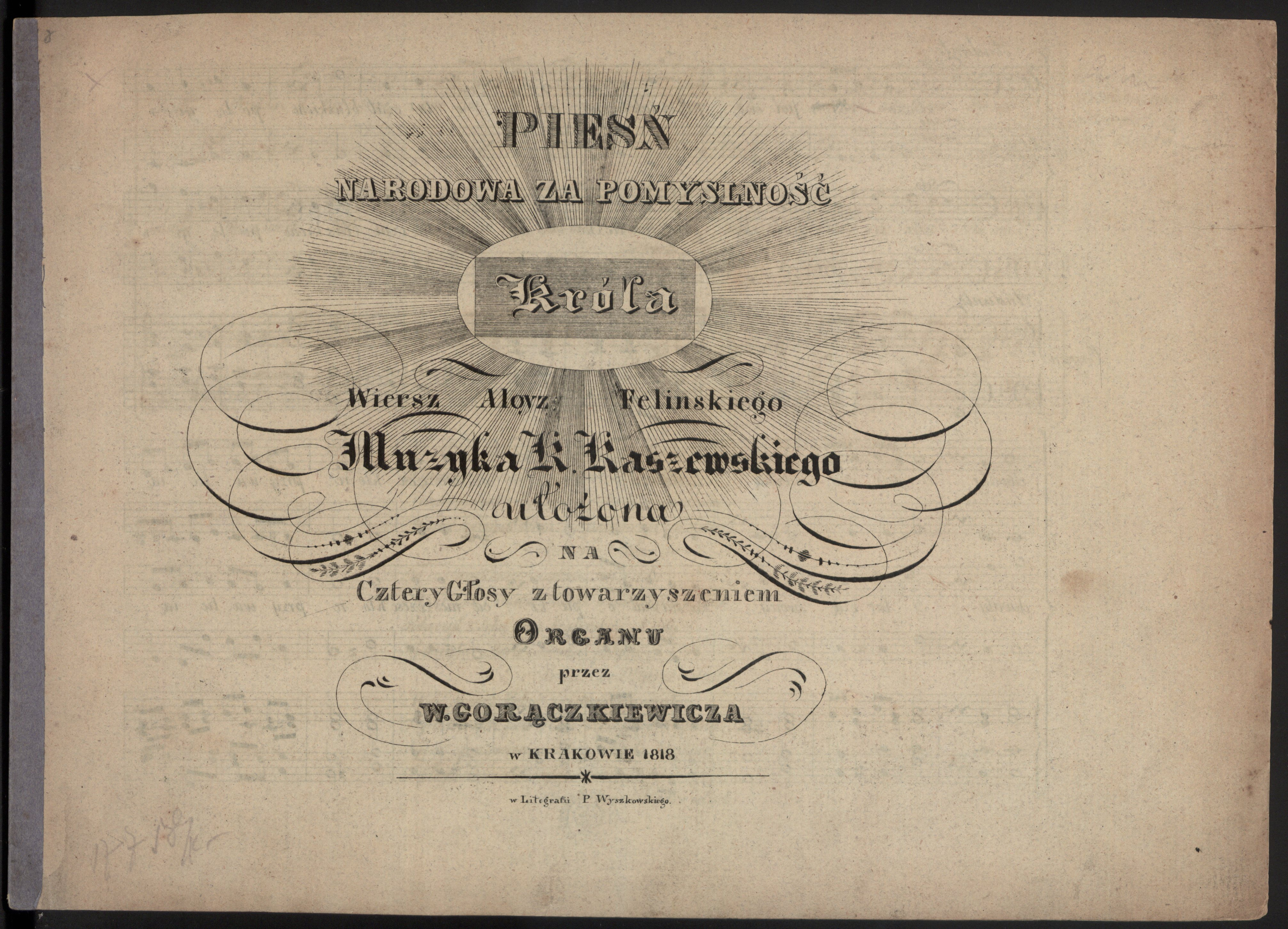
The front cover of the first 1818 edition of the hymn

Boże, coś Polskę is a Polish patriotic hymn. When Poland regained independence in 1918, the hymn competed unsuccessfully with "Poland Is Not Yet Lost" ("Mazurek Dąbrowskiego") to become Poland's national anthem.

Due to its invocation of God, the hymn's title has often been rendered in English as God Save Poland, by analogy with Britain's "God Save the King".

The Polish hymn opens: "Boże! Coś Polskę przez tak liczne wieki / Otaczał blaskiem potęgi i chwały..." ("Lord, Who for ages favored Poland with might and glory...").

The original text, by Alojzy Feliński, was published in Gazeta Warszawska on 20 July 1816, in homage to the King of Congress Poland, Russian Czar Alexander I, and from 1818 was known by the title "Pieśń narodowa za pomyślność króla". This caused much controversy, and the following year the refrain's last line was unofficially sung as "Naszą ojczyznę racz nam wrócić, Panie" ("Return our homeland, O Lord") instead of "Naszego króla zachowaj nam Panie!" ("God save our King!").

February 1817 saw the publication of a "Hymn do Boga o zachowanie wolności" (incipit: "O Ty! którego potężna prawica..."), by Antoni Gorecki. From it, two stanzas were incorporated into "Boże, coś Polskę".

The initial melody, by Captain Jan Nepomucen Kraszewski of the 4th Infantry Regiment, was soon forgotten, replaced by well-known church anthems: first "Bądź pozdrowiona Panienko Maryjo" ("Hail, Virgin Mary") and later "Serdeczna Matko" ("Beloved Mother").

In 1862 the hymn, long since become an expression of opposition to the occupying Russian Empire, was banned in Poland's Russian partition. It was widely sung by the insurgents of the 1863 Uprising, earning the nickname of "La Marseillaise of 1863". In the 20th century, "Boże, coś Polskę" was sung during the Nazi occupation of Poland and during the 1980s martial law in Poland.

== Text sampler ==
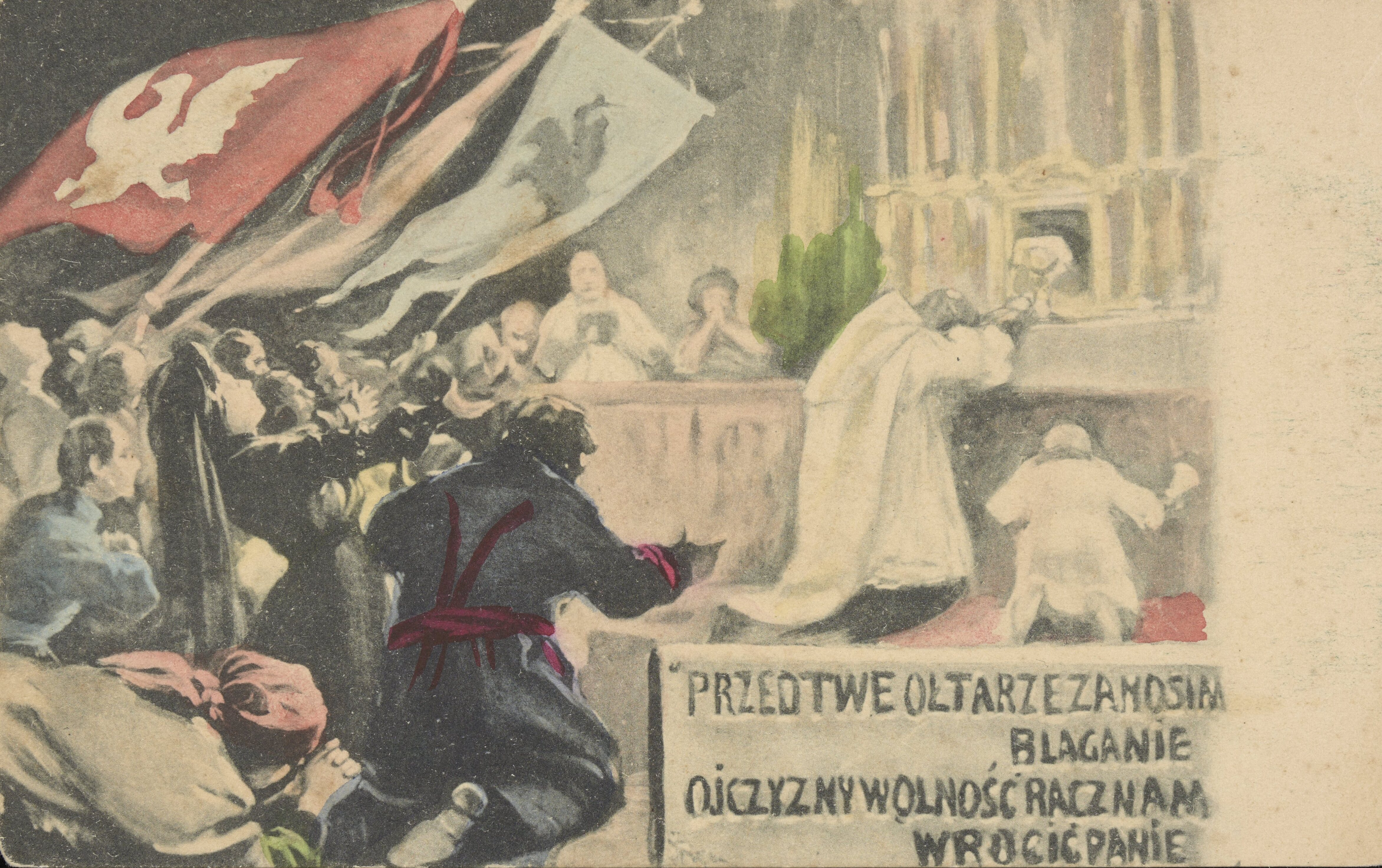
Postcard from 1909 with the hymn's refrain, as well as the standards with the Polish Eagle and the Lithuanian Coat of Arms

=== Polish ===
Polish original

by Alojzy Feliński

Boże! Coś Polskę przez tak liczne wieki
Otaczał blaskiem potęgi i chwały
I tarczą swojej zasłaniał opieki
Od nieszczęść, które przywalić ją miały
𝄆 Przed Twe ołtarze zanosim błaganie,
Naszego Króla zachowaj nam Panie! 𝄇

Tyś, coś ją potem, tknięty jej upadkiem,
Wspierał walczącą za najświętszą sprawę,
I chcąc świat cały mieć jej męstwa świadkiem,
Wśród samych nieszczęść pomnożył jej sławę
𝄆 Przed Twe ołtarze zanosim błaganie,
Naszego Króla zachowaj nam Panie! 𝄇

Ty, coś na koniec nowymi ją cudy
Wskrzesił i sławne z klęsk wzajemnych w boju
Połączył z sobą dwa braterskie ludy,
Pod jedno berło Anioła pokoju:
𝄆 Przed Twe ołtarze zanosim błaganie,
Naszego Króla zachowaj nam Panie! 𝄇

Wróć nowej Polsce świetność starożytną
I spraw, niech pod Nim szczęśliwą zostanie
Niech zaprzyjaźnione dwa narody kwitną,
I błogosławią Jego panowanie;
𝄆 Przed Twe ołtarze zanosim błaganie,
Naszego Króla zachowaj nam Panie! 𝄇

Final

Boże, coś Polskę przez tak liczne wieki
Otaczał blaskiem potęgi i chwały,
Coś ją osłaniał tarczą swej opieki
Od nieszczęść, które przywalić ją miały.
𝄆 Przed Twe ołtarze zanosim błaganie,
Ojczyznę wolną racz nam wrócić, Panie! 𝄇

Ty, któryś potem tknięty jej upadkiem
Wspierał walczących za najświętszą sprawę,
A chcąc świat cały mieć jej męstwa świadkiem
W nieszczęściach samych pomnażał jej sławę.
𝄆 Przed Twe ołtarze zanosim błaganie,
Ojczyznę wolną racz nam wrócić, Panie! 𝄇

Niedawnoś wolność zabrał z polskiej ziemi,
Ałez, krwi naszej popłynęły rzeki,
Jakże to musi być okropnie z tymi,
Którym ojczyznę odbierasz na wieki.
𝄆 Przed Twe ołtarze zanosim błaganie,
Ojczyznę wolną racz nam wrócić, Panie! 𝄇

Wróć naszej Polsce świetność starożytną,
Użyźnij pola, spustoszałe łany,
Niech szczęście, pokój na nowo zakwitną,
Przestań nas karać, Boże zagniewany!
𝄆 Przed Twe ołtarze zanosim błaganie,
Ojczyznę wolną racz nam wrócić, Panie! 𝄇

Boże, którego ramię sprawiedliwe
Żelazne berła władców świata kruszy,
Skarć naszych wrogów zamiary szkodliwe
Obudź naǳieję w każdej polskiej duszy.
𝄆 Przed Twe ołtarze zanosim błaganie,
Ojczyznę wolną racz nam wrócić, Panie! 𝄇

Boże Najświętszy! Przez Twe wielkie cudy
Oddalaj od nas klęski, mordy boju,
Połącz wolności węzłem Twoje ludy
Pod (edno berło Anioła Pokoju.
𝄆 Przed Twe ołtarze zanosim błaganie,
Ojczyznę wolną racz nam wrócić, Panie! 𝄇

Boże Najświętszy, przez Chrystusa rany
Świeć wiekuiście nad braćmi zmarłymi.
Spojrzyj na lud Twój niewolą znękany,
Przyjmij ofiary z synów polskiej ziemi.
𝄆 Przed Twe ołtarze zanosim błaganie,
Ojczyznę wolną racz nam wrócić, Panie! 𝄇

=== Translations ===
From US congressional records:

O God, who, for so many centuries
Has granted to Poland the splendor of might and glory,
Who, with the shield of Your protection,
Saved her from the misfortune designed to destroy her;
𝄆 Before Your Altars, we offer our prayers:
Return to us, O Lord, our free fatherland. 𝄇

English version by Mary McDowell

from Folk Songs of Many Peoples:

O Thou Lord God, who for so many ages
Didst give to Poland splendor and might
Who shielded her from storms' wild rages
And kept her ever in Thy holy sight.
𝄆 Father, we kneel to plead before Thy throne,
Give to us freedom, give to us our own! 𝄇

== See also ==
- Poland Is Not Yet Lost
- Warszawianka (1831)
- Gaude Mater Polonia
- Bogurodzica
