= 11 listopada =

2008 Polish war film

11 Listopada
- Film poster
- Directed by: Kamil Kulczycki; Urszula Szałata
- Written by: Kamil Kulczycki; Urszula Szałata
- Produced by: Hieronim Kulczycki
- Music by: Piotr Dębski
- Production company: RV Studio
- Release date: 9 November 2008
- Running time: 86 minutes
- Country: Poland
- Language: Polish

11 listopada (lit. '11 November') is a 2008 Polish war film directed by Kamil Kulczycki and Urszula Szałata. The film presents a series of events which led to the first execution of civilians in occupied Poland.

The first official screening of the film took place on November 9, 2008 at the Wisła cinema in Warsaw.

For the production of the film, Kamil Kulczycki and Urszula Szałata received in 2008 the award of the Society of Zielonka Friends in the category "Event of the Year 2008".

== Plot ==
11 listopada is set shortly before and at the beginning of World War II. It tells the story of a group of Scouts from Zielonka, a small town near Warsaw, who, finding themselves unable to come to terms with the German occupation, decided to continue in secret their scouting activity. One night, on the eve of 11 November 1939 (Polish Independence Day), they put up in the streets of the town 15 hand-made posters with the text of Rota (The Oath), a poem and an anthem by Maria Konopnicka. In the gloomy reality of the German occupation, this act was supposed to express hope. Perhaps they were dreaming of a moment of hesitation from a passer-by, rising hearts, and a kind smile at this manifestation of national solidarity.

== Cast ==
- Maciej Skowronek as Jan Rudzki
- Artur Jarząbek as Kazimierz Stawiarski
- Mariusz Domagała as Stanisław Golcz
- Bartosz Kulikowski as Zbigniew Dymek
- Paweł Marczuk as Józef Wyrzykowski
- Sławomir Koc as Józef Kulczycki
