= Poland Is Not Yet Lost =

National anthem of Poland

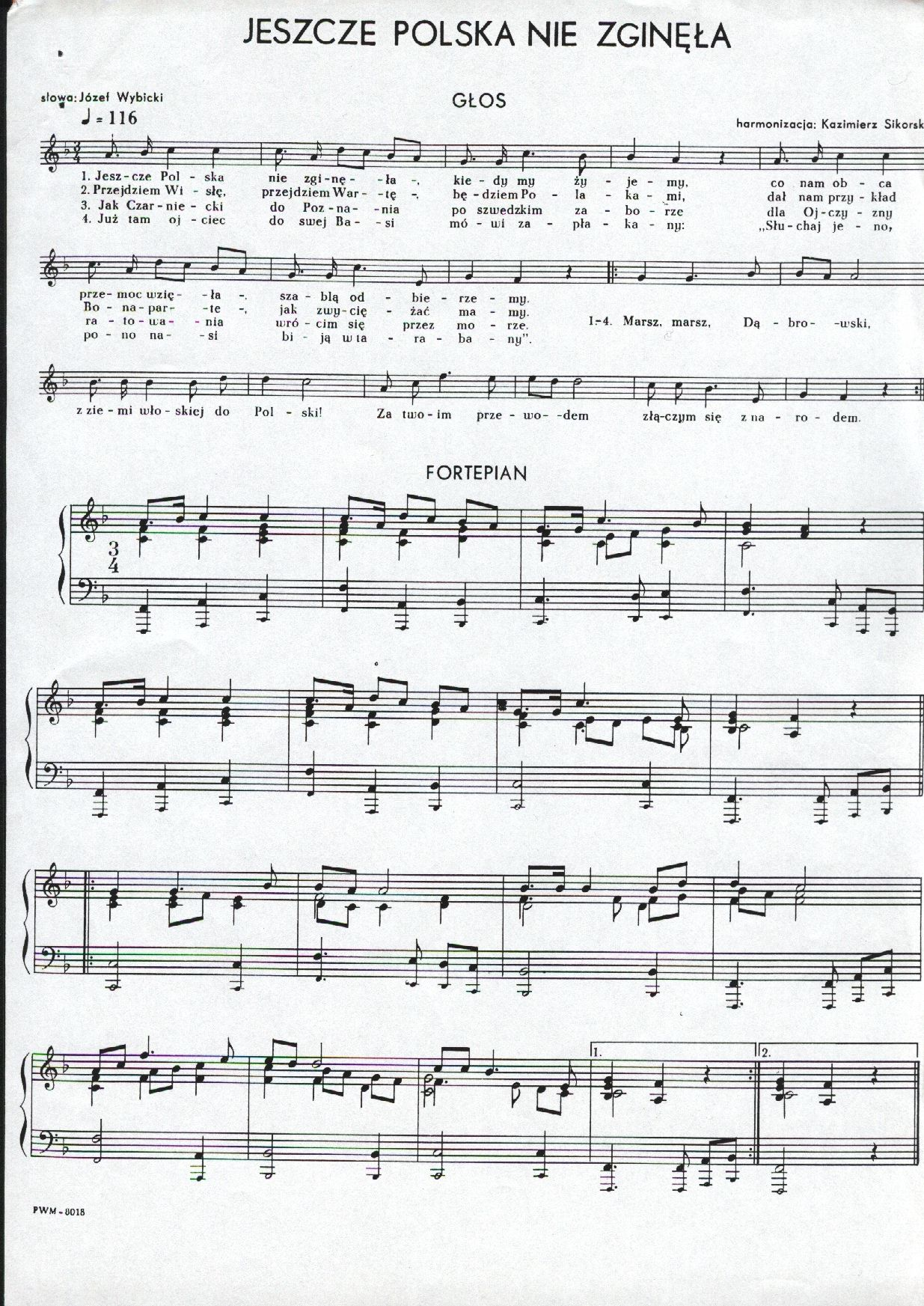
- Sheet music for "Poland Is Not Yet Lost"
- National anthem of Poland
- Also known as: „Pieśń Legionów Polskich we Włoszech” (English: 'Song of the Polish Legions in Italy') „Mazurek Dąbrowskiego” (English: 'Dąbrowski's Mazurka')
- Lyrics: Józef Wybicki, 1797
- Music: Unknown, 18th century (arranged by Kazimierz Sikorski)
- Adopted: 26 February 1927; 99 years ago

Audio sample
- Official instrumental version in F major (one verse): file; help

"Poland Is Not Yet Lost", (Note: Polish: Jeszcze Polska nie zginęła, pronounced [ˈjɛʂt͡ʂɛ ˈpɔlska ɲɛ zɡʲiˈnɛwa]) known in Polish as "Mazurek Dąbrowskiego" (pronounced [maˈzurɛk dɔmbrɔfˈskʲɛɡɔ]; lit. 'Dąbrowski's Mazurka') (Note: The title and incipit "Poland Is Not Yet Lost" is the anthem's official name in English. However, in Polish, the anthem is primarily known by the name Mazurek Dąbrowskiego.) and formerly the "Song of the Polish Legions in Italy", (Note: Polish: Pieśń Legionów Polskich we Włoszech, pronounced [ˈpjɛɕɲ lɛˈɡʲɔnuf ˈpɔlskʲiɣ vɛ ˈvwɔʂɛx]) is the national anthem of Poland. The original lyrics were written by Józef Wybicki in Reggio Emilia, in Northern Italy, between 16 and 19 July 1797, two years after the Third Partition of Poland marked the end of the Polish–Lithuanian Commonwealth. Its initial purpose was to raise the morale of Jan Henryk Dąbrowski's Polish Legions that served with Napoleon Bonaparte in the Italian campaigns of the French Revolutionary Wars. The song expressed the idea that the nation of Poland, despite lacking an independent state of their own, had not disappeared as long as the Polish people endured and fought in its name.

Following the declaration of independence of the Second Polish Republic in 1918, the song became its de facto national anthem, and was officially adopted in 1927. It also inspired similar songs by other peoples struggling for independence during the 19th century, such as the Ukrainian anthem "Ukraine Is Not Yet Perished", the Israeli anthem "Hatikvah (Our hope is not yet lost)", the Croatian reveille "Croatia has not yet fallen" and the Yugoslav and Slovak anthem "Hey, Slavs".

== Etymology ==
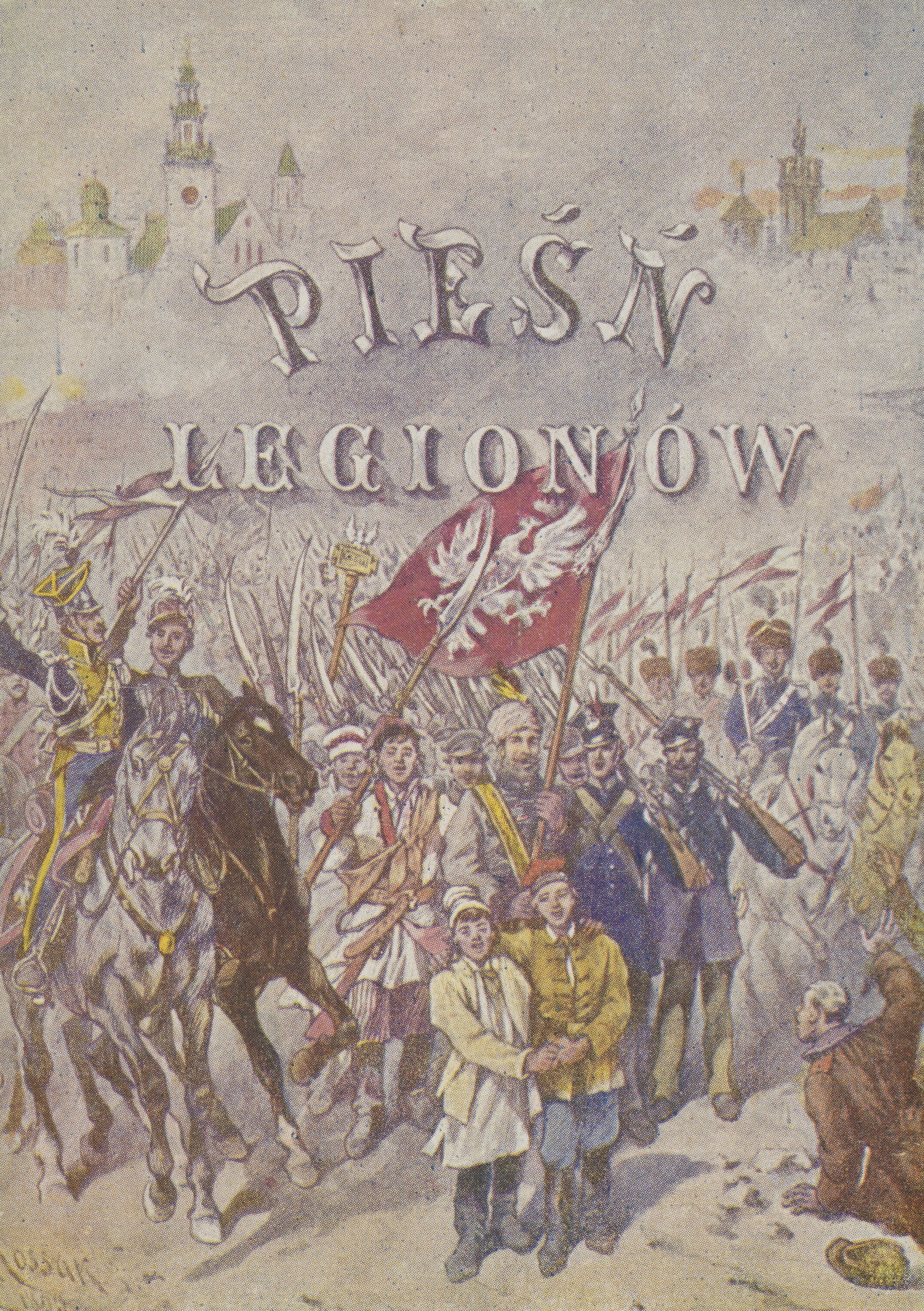
One of a series of postcards, designed by Juliusz Kossak, illustrating the lyrics of "Mazurek Dąbrowskiego"

It is also known by its original title, "Pieśń Legionów Polskich we Włoszech" ('Song of the Polish Legions in Italy'). As there are no official translations of the name into English, various translations of its Polish incipit "Jeszcze Polska nie zginęła" include 'Poland has not yet perished', 'Poland has not perished yet', 'Poland is not lost', 'Poland is not lost yet', 'Poland is not yet lost', and 'Poland has not yet succumbed'.

== Lyrics ==
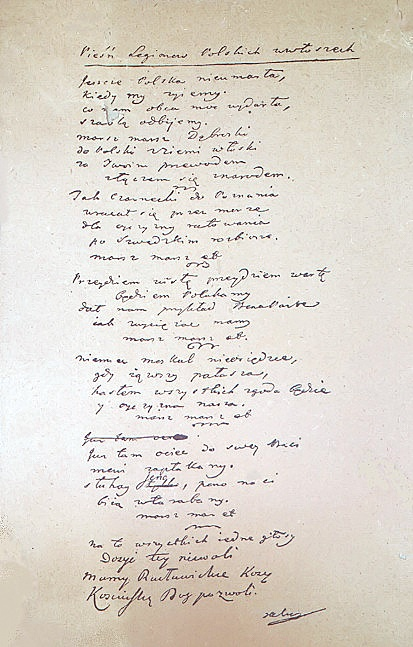
Facsimile of Wybicki's manuscript of the "Song of the Polish Legions in Italy"

The original lyrics, authored by Wybicki, are a poem consisting of six quatrains and a refrain quatrain repeated after all but the last stanza, all following an ABAB rhyme scheme. The official lyrics, based on a variant from 1806, "Poland has not yet died", suggesting a more violent cause of the nation's possible death. Wybicki's original manuscript was in the hands of his descendants until February 1944, when it was lost in Wybicki's great-great-grandson, Johann von Roznowski's home in Charlottenburg during the Allied bombing of Berlin. The manuscript is known today only from facsimile copies, twenty-four of which were made in 1886 by Edward Rożnowski, Wybicki's grandson, who donated them to Polish libraries.

The main theme of the poem is the idea that was novel in the times of early nationalisms based on centralized nation-states – that the lack of political sovereignty does not preclude the existence of a nation. As Adam Mickiewicz explained in 1842 to students of Slavic Literature in Paris, the song "The famous song of the Polish legions begins with lines that express the new history: Poland has not perished yet as long as we live. These words mean that people who have in them what constitutes the essence of a nation can prolong the existence of their country regardless of its political circumstances and may even strive to make it real again..." The song also includes a call to arms and expresses the hope that, under General Dąbrowski's command, the legionaries would rejoin their nation and retrieve "what the foreign force has seized" through armed struggle.

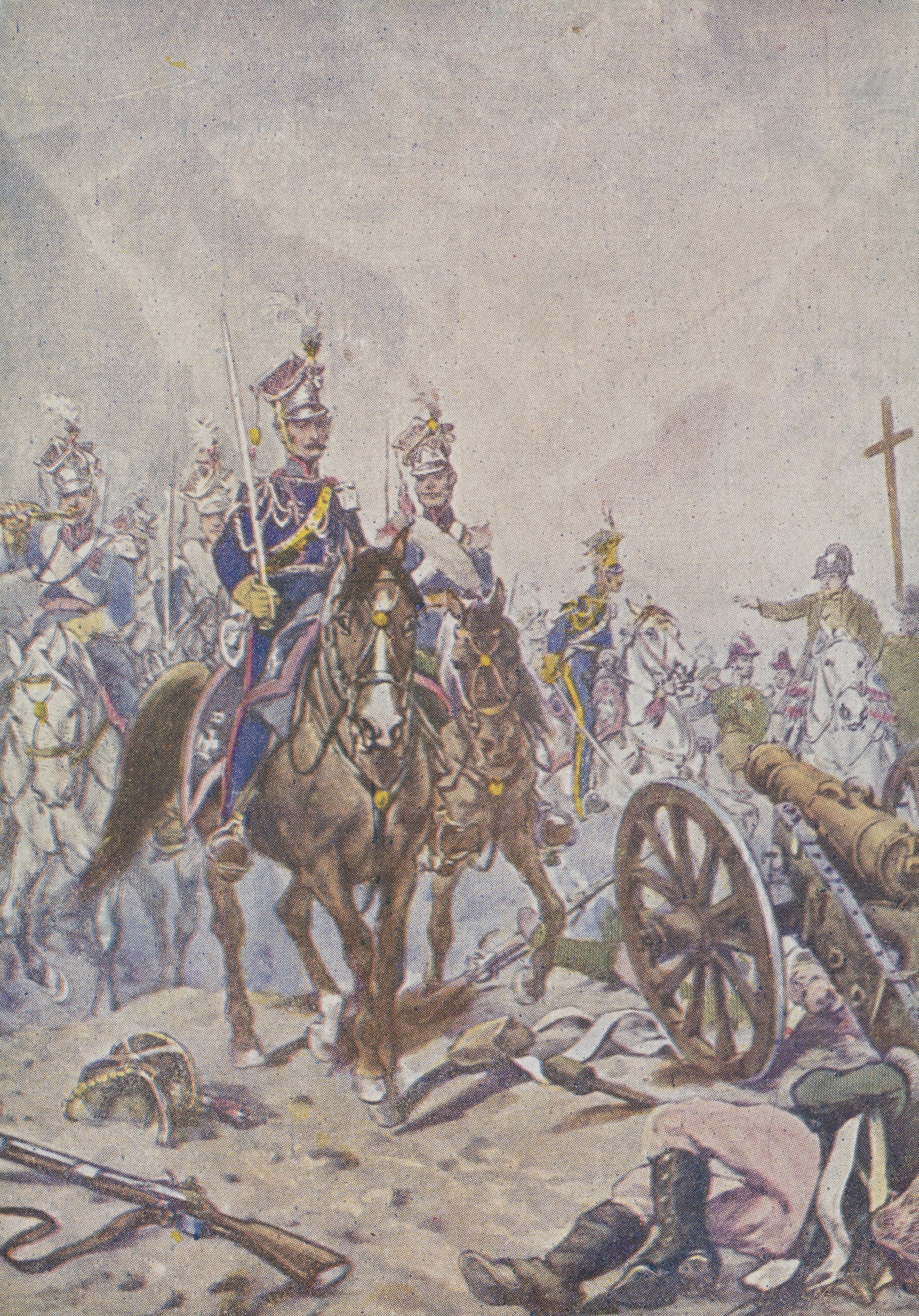
Bonaparte has shown us ways to victory

The chorus and subsequent stanzas include heart-lifting examples of military heroes, set as role models for Polish soldiers: Jan Henryk Dąbrowski, Napoleon, Stefan Czarniecki, and Tadeusz Kościuszko.

Dąbrowski, for whom the anthem is named, was a commander in the failed 1794 Kościuszko Uprising against Russia. After the Third Partition in 1795, he came to Paris to seek French aid in re-establishing Polish independence and in 1796, he started the formation of the Polish Legions, a Polish unit of the French Revolutionary Army.

Bonaparte was, at the time when the song was written, a commander of the Italian campaign of French Revolutionary Wars and Dąbrowski's superior. Having already proven his skills as a military leader, he is described in the lyrics as the one "who has shown us ways to victory." Bonaparte is the only non-Polish person mentioned by name in the Polish anthem.

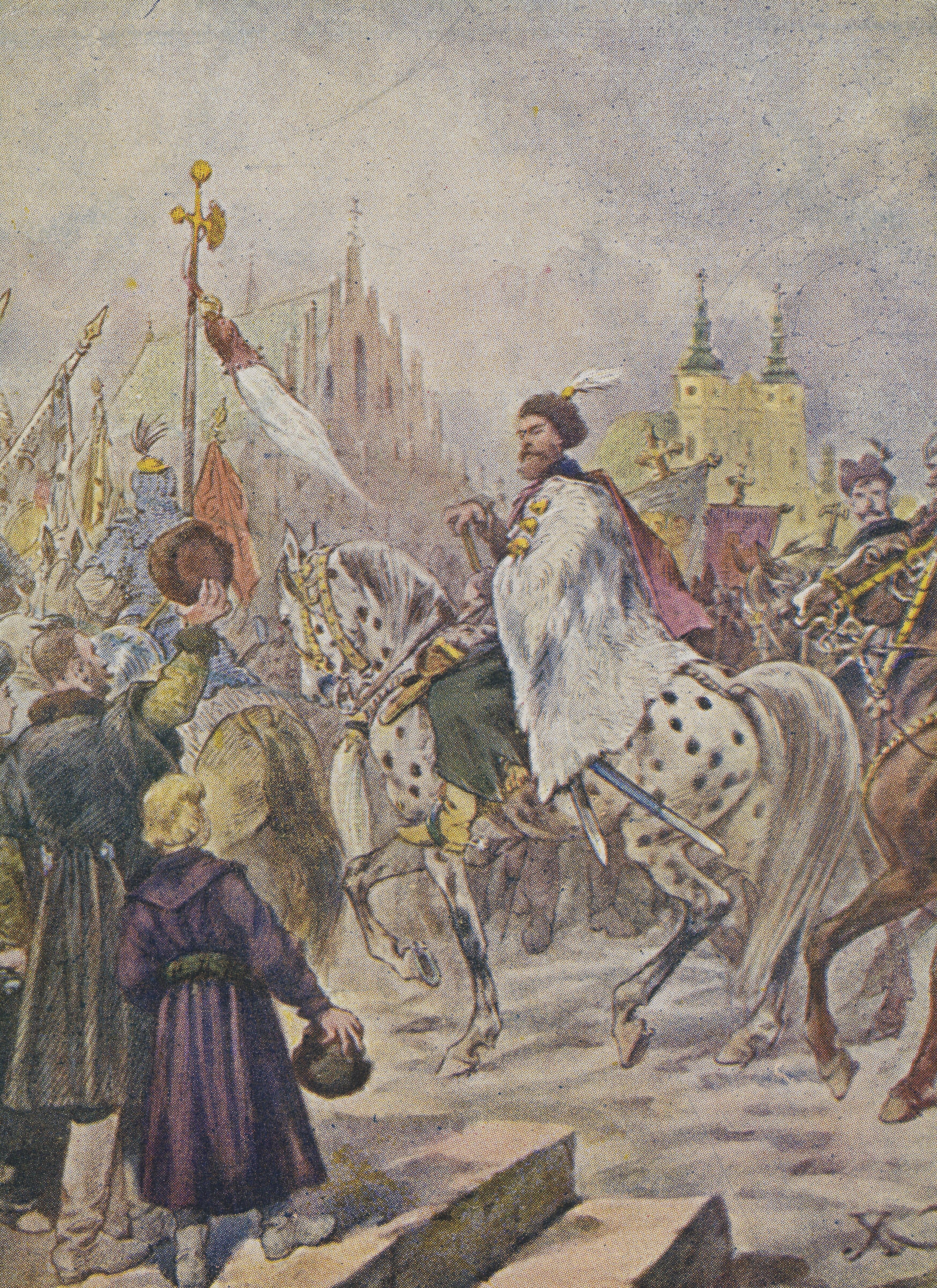
Like Czarniecki to Poznań...

Stefan Czarniecki was a 17th-century hetman, famous for his role in driving the Swedish Army out of Poland after an occupation that had left the country in ruins and is remembered by Poles as the Deluge. With the outbreak of a Dano-Swedish War, he continued his fight against Sweden in Denmark, from where he "returned across the sea" to fight the invaders alongside the king, who was then at the Royal Castle in Poznań. In the same castle, Józef Wybicki started his career as a lawyer in 1765.

Kościuszko, mentioned in a stanza now missing from the anthem, became a hero of the American Revolutionary War before coming back to Poland to defend his native country from Russia in the war of 1792 and a national uprising he led in 1794. One of his major victories during the uprising was the Battle of Racławice, where the result was partly due to Polish peasants armed with scythes. Alongside the scythes, the song mentioned other types of weaponry, traditionally used by the Polish szlachta, or nobility: the sabre, known in Polish as szabla, and the backsword.

Basia (a feminine diminutive of Barbara) and her father are fictional characters. They are used to represent the women and elderly men who waited for the Polish soldiers to return home and liberate their fatherland. The route that Dąbrowski and his legions hoped to follow upon leaving Italy is hinted at by the words "we'll cross the Vistula, we'll cross the Warta", two major rivers flowing through the parts of Poland that were in Austrian and Prussian hands at the time.

=== Current official lyrics ===
Polish original

I
Jeszcze Polska nie zginęła,
Kiedy my żyjemy.
Co nam obca przemoc wzięła,
Szablą odbierzemy.

Refren:
𝄆 Marsz, marsz, Dąbrowski,
Z ziemi włoskiej do Polski.
Za twoim przewodem
Złączym się z narodem. 𝄇

II
Przejdziem Wisłę, przejdziem Wartę,
Będziem Polakami.
Dał nam przykład Bonaparte,
Jak zwyciężać mamy.

Refren

III
Jak Czarniecki do Poznania
Po szwedzkim zaborze,
Dla ojczyzny ratowania
Wrócim się przez morze.

Refren

IV
Już tam ojciec do swej Basi
Mówi zapłakany –
Słuchaj jeno, pono nasi
Biją w tarabany.

Refren

IPA transcription (Note: See Help:IPA/Polish and Polish phonology.)

1
[ˈjɛ.ʂt͡ʂɛ ˈpɔl.ska ɲɛ‿zɡʲi.ˈnɛ.wa]
[ˈkʲjɛ.dɨ mɨ ʐɨ.ˈjɛ.mɨ |]
[t͡sɔ nam ˈɔp.t͡sa ˈpʂɛ.mɔd͡z‿ˈvʑɛ.wa]
[ˈʂa.blɔ̃ ˈɔd.bʲjɛ.ʐɛ.mɨ ‖]

[ˈrɛ.frɛn]
𝄆 [marʂ marʐ‿dɔm.ˈbrɔf.skʲi |]
[z‿ˈʑɛ.mʲi ˈvwɔ.skʲjɛj dɔ ˈpɔl.skʲi ‖]
[za‿ˈtfɔ.im pʂɛ.ˈvɔ.dɛm |]
[ˈzwɔn.t͡ʂɨm ɕɛ‿z‿na.ˈrɔ.dɛm ‖] 𝄇

2
[ˈpʂɛj.d͡ʑɛɱ‿ˈvʲi.swɛ ˈpʂɛj.d͡ʑɛɱ‿ˈvar.tɛ]
[ˈbɛɲ.d͡ʑɛm pɔ.la.ˈka.mʲi |]
[daw nam ˈpʂɨ.kwad‿bɔ.na.ˈpar.tɛ]
[jag‿zvɨ.ˈt͡ɕɛw̃.ʐat͡ɕ ˈma.mɨ ‖]

[ˈrɛ.frɛn]

3
[jak t͡ʂar.ˈɲɛt͡s.kʲi dɔ pɔ.ˈzna.ɲa]
[pɔ‿ˈʂfɛt͡s.kʲim za.ˈbɔ.ʐɛ |]
[dla ɔj.ˈt͡ʂɨ.znɨ ra.tɔ.ˈva.ɲa]
[ˈvru.t͡ɕim ɕɛ‿pʂɛz‿ˈmɔ.ʐɛ ‖]

[ˈrɛ.frɛn]

4
[juʂ‿tam ˈɔj.t͡ɕɛd͡z‿dɔ‿sfɛj ˈba.ɕi]
[ˈmu.vʲi za.pwa.ˈka.nɨ |]
[ˈswu.xaj ˈjɛ.nɔ ˈpɔ.nɔ ˈna.ɕi]
[ˈbʲi.jɔw̃‿f‿ta.ra.ˈba.nɨ |]

[ˈrɛ.frɛn]

English translation

I
Poland has not yet succumbed.
As long as we remain,
What the foe by force has seized,
Sword in hand we'll gain.

Chorus:
𝄆 March! March, Dabrowski!
From Italian soil to Poland!
Under your command
We shall reach our land. 𝄇

II
Cross the Vistula and Warta
And Poles we shall be;
We've been shown by Bonaparte
Ways to victory.

Chorus

III
As Czarniecki Poznan town regains,
Fighting with the Swede,
To free our fatherland from chains.
We shall return by sea.

Chorus

IV
And the father to Basia,
Then says and crying:
"Listen to that, it's our boys
playing the drums!"

Chorus

=== Original text by Józef Wybicki ===
Polish original
(original spelling)

I
Jeszcze Polska nie umarła,
Kiedy my żyjemy
Co nam obca moc wydarła,
Szablą odbijemy.

Refren:
𝄆 Marsz, marsz, Dąbrowski
Do Polski z ziemi włoski
Za twoim przewodem
Złączym się z narodem. 𝄇

II
Przejdziem Wisłę, przejdziem Wartę
Będziem Polakami
Dał nam przykład Bonaparte
Jak zwyciężać mamy.

Refren

III
Jak Czarniecki do Poznania
Wracał się przez morze
Dla ojczyzny ratowania
Po szwedzkim rozbiorze.

Refren

IV
Niemiec, Moskal nie osiędzie,
Gdy jąwszy pałasza,
Hasłem wszystkich zgoda będzie
I ojczyzna nasza

Refren

V
Już tam ojciec do swej Basi
Mówi zapłakany
Słuchaj jeno, pono nasi
Biją w tarabany.

Refren

VI
Na to wszystkich jedne głosy
Dosyć tej niewoli
Mamy racławickie kosy
Kościuszkę Bóg pozwoli.

Refren

English translation

I
Poland has not yet succumbed.
As long as we remain,
What the foe by force has seized,
Sword in hand we'll gain.

Chorus:
𝄆 March! March, Dabrowski!
To Poland from Italian soil!
Under your command
We shall reach our land. 𝄇

II
Cross the Vistula and Warta
And Poles we shall be;
We've been shown by Bonaparte
Ways to victory.

Chorus

III
As Czarniecki Poznan town regains,
Fighting with the Swede,
To free our fatherland from chains.
We shall return by sea.

Chorus

IV
The German nor the Muscovite will settle
When, with a backsword in hand,
"Concord" be everyone's watchword
And so be our fatherland.

Chorus

V
And the father to Basia,
Then says and crying:
"Listen to that, it's our boys
playing the drums!"

Chorus

VI
All exclaim in unison,
"Enough of this captivity!"
We've got the scythes of Racławice,
Kościuszko, if God wills.

Chorus

== Music ==
"Mazurek Dąbrowskiego"
One verse of "Mazurek Dąbrowskiego" performed by the U.S. Navy Band

The melody of the Polish anthem is a lively and rhythmical mazurka. Mazurka as a musical form derives from the stylization of traditional melodies for the folk dances of Mazuria, an historical region in northeast Poland. It is characterized by a triple meter and strong accents placed irregularly on the second or third beat. Considered one of Poland's national dances in pre-partition times, it owes its popularity in 19th-century Western European ballrooms to the mazurkas of Frédéric Chopin.

The composer of "Mazurek Dąbrowskiego" is not known, though most contemporary performances of it utilize a modern arrangement by composer Kazimierz Sikorski. The melody is most probably Wybicki's adaptation of a folk tune that had already been popular during the second half of the 18th century. The composition used to be erroneously attributed to Michał Kleofas Ogiński, who was known to have written a march for Dąbrowski's legions. Several historians confused Ogiński's "Marche pour les Légions polonaises" ('March for the Polish Legions') with Wybicki's mazurka, possibly due to the mazurka's chorus "March, march, Dąbrowski", until Ogiński's sheet music for the march was discovered in 1938 and proven to be a different piece of music than Poland's national anthem.

The first composer to use the anthem for an artistic music piece is always stated to be Karol Kurpiński. In 1821, he composed his piano/organ Fugue on "Jeszcze Polska nie zginęła" (it was published in 1821 in Warsaw; the first modern edition by Rostislaw Wygranienko was printed only in 2009). However, Karol Lipiński used it in an overture for his opera Kłótnia przez zakład composed and staged in Lviv c. 1812.

Wojciech Sowiński was the next who arranged "Mazurek Dąbrowskiego" for the piano. The arrangement, accompanied by the lyrics in Polish and French, was published 1829 in Paris. German composers who were moved by the suffering of the November Uprising wove the mazurek into their works. Examples include Richard Wagner's Polonia Overture and Albert Lortzing's Der Pole und sein Kind.

The current official musical score of the national anthem was arranged by Kazimierz Sikorski and published by the Polish Ministry of Culture and National Heritage. Sikorski's harmonization allows for each vocal version to be performed either a cappella or together with any of the instrumental versions. Some orchestra parts, marked in the score as ad libitum, may be left out or replaced by other instruments of equivalent musical scale.

In 1908, Ignacy Jan Paderewski, later to become the first Prime Minister of independent Poland, quoted the anthem in a disguised way in his Symphony in B minor "Polonia". He scored it in duple meter rather than its standard triple meter.

The anthem was quoted by Edward Elgar in his symphonic prelude Polonia, composed in 1915.

== Regulations ==
The national anthem is, along with the national coat of arms and the national colors, one of three national symbols defined by the Polish constitution. As such, it is protected by law which declares that treating the national symbols "with reverence and respect" is the "right and obligation" of every Polish citizen and all state organs, institutions and organizations. The anthem should be performed or reproduced especially at celebrations of national holidays and anniversaries. Civilians should pay respect to the anthem by standing in a dignified manner; additionally, men should uncover their heads. Members of uniformed services should stand at attention; if their uniform includes headgear and they are not standing in an organized group, they should also perform the two-finger salute. The song is required to be played in the key of F major if played for a public purpose. Color guards pay respect to the anthem by dipping their banners.

== History ==
=== Origin ===
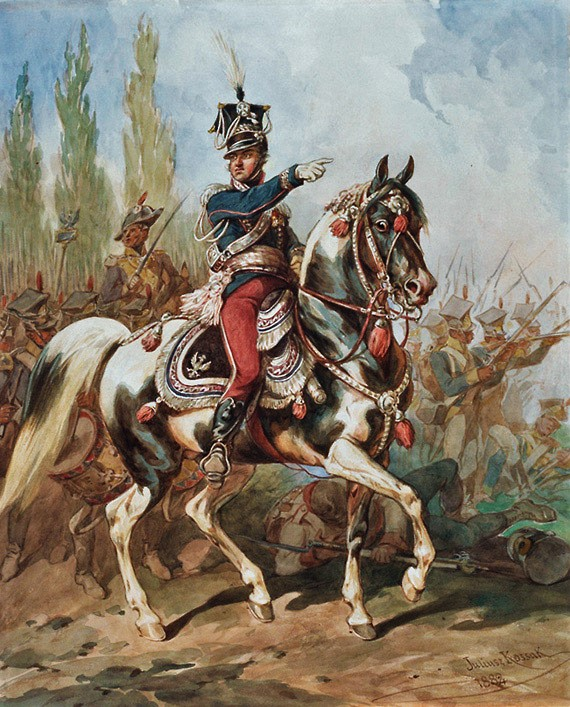
Jan Henryk Dąbrowski (1755–1818)

In 1795, after a prolonged decline and despite last-minute attempts at constitutional reforms and armed resistance, the Polish–Lithuanian Commonwealth was ultimately partitioned by its three neighbors: Russia, Prussia and Austria. A once-vast and powerful empire was effectively erased from the map while monarchs of the partitioning powers pledged never to use the name "Poland" in their official titles. For many, including even leading representatives of the Polish Enlightenment, this new political situation meant the end of the Polish nation. In the words of Hugo Kołłątaj, a notable Polish political thinker of the time, "Poland no longer belonged to currently extant nations," (Note: Polish: (Polska) przestała należeć do narodów aktualnie będących.) while historian Tadeusz Czacki declared that Poland "was now effaced from the number of nations." (Note: Polish: Polska wymazana jest z liczby narodów.)

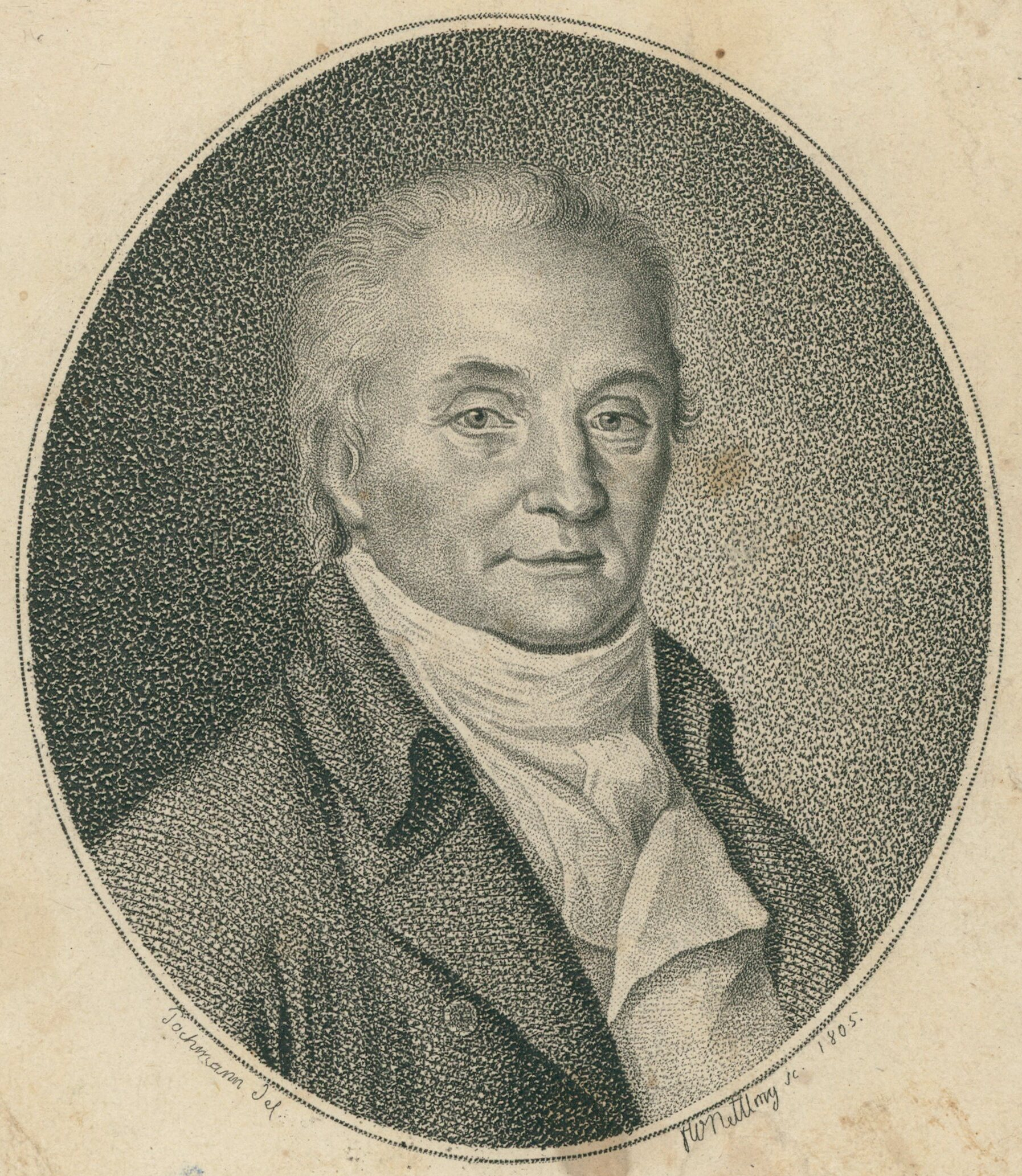
Józef Wybicki (1747–1822)

Meanwhile, Polish patriots and revolutionaries turned for help to France, Poland's traditional ally, which was at war with Austria (member of the First Coalition) at the time. Józef Wybicki was among the leading moderate émigré politicians seeking French aid in re-establishing Polish independence. In 1796, he came up with the idea of creating Polish Legions within the French Revolutionary Army. To this end, he convinced General Jan Henryk Dąbrowski, a hero of the Greater Poland campaign of the 1794 Kościuszko Uprising, to come to Paris and present the plan to the French Directory. Dąbrowski was sent by the Directory to Napoleon, who was then spreading the French Revolution in northern Italy. In January 1797, the newly created French-controlled Cisalpine Republic accepted Dąbrowski's offer and a Polish legion was formed. Dąbrowski and his soldiers hoped to fight against Austria under Napoleon and, subsequently, march across the Austrian territory, "from Italy to Poland", where they would ignite a national uprising.

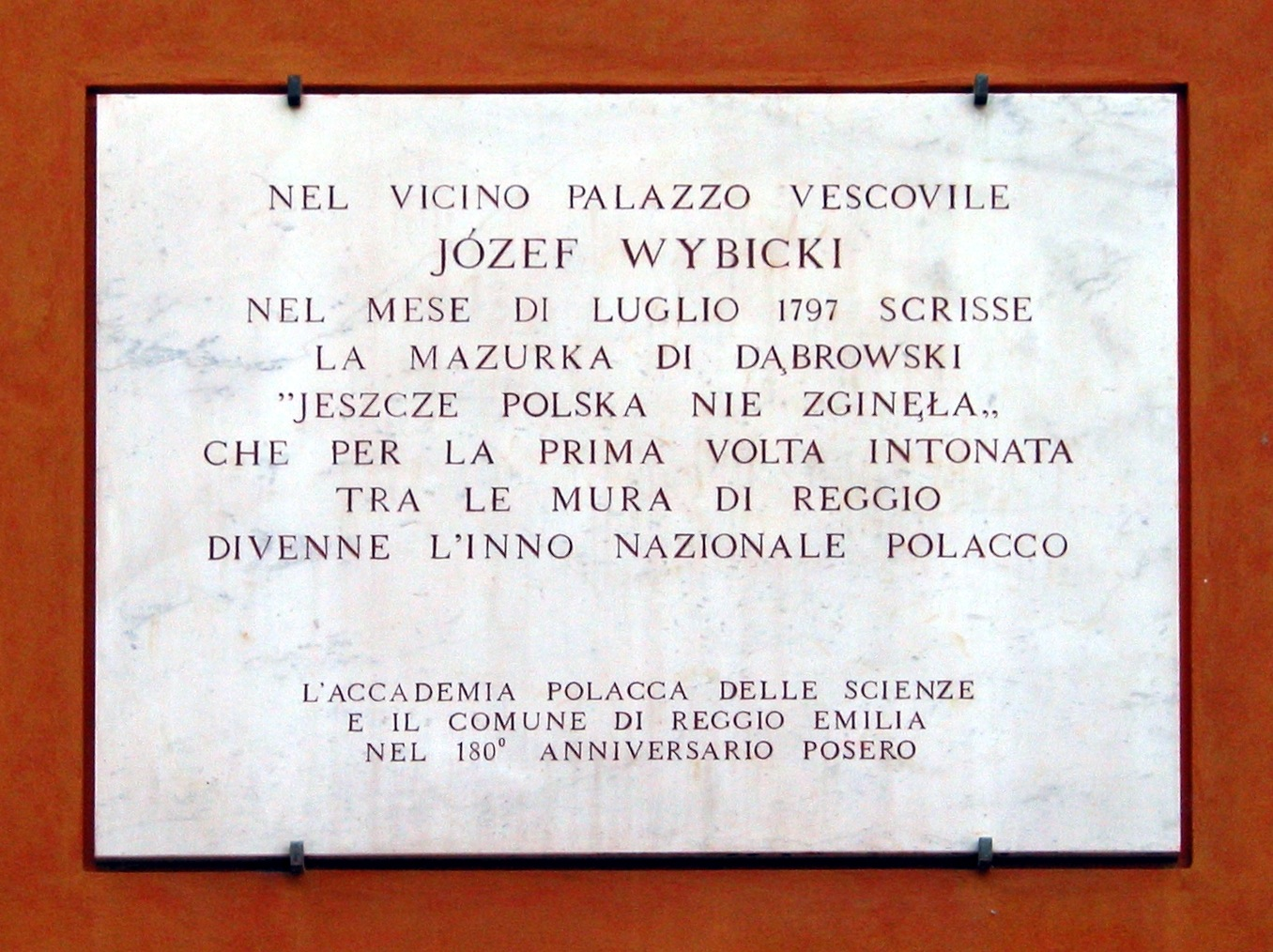
A commemorative plaque in Reggio Emilia, Italy

In early July 1797, Wybicki arrived in Reggio Emilia where the Polish Legions were then quartered and where he wrote the Song of the Polish Legions soon afterwards. He first sung it at a private meeting of Polish officers in the Legions' headquarters at the episcopal palace in Reggio. The first public performance most probably took place on 16 July 1797 during a military parade in Reggio's Piazza del Duomo (Cathedral Square). On 20 July, it was played again as the Legions were marching off from Reggio to Milan, the Cisalpine capital.

With its heart-lifting lyrics and folk melody, the song soon became a popular tune among Polish legionaries. On 29 August 1797, Dąbrowski already wrote to Wybicki from Bologna: "soldiers gain more and more taste for your song." (Note: Polish: Żołnierze do Twojej pieśni coraz więcej gustu nabierają.) It appealed to both officers, usually émigré noblemen, and simple soldiers, most of whom were Galician peasants who had been drafted into the Austrian army and captured as POWs by the French. The last stanza, referring to Kościuszko, who famously fought for freedom of the entire nation rather than the nobility alone, and the "scythes of Racławice", seems to be directed particularly at the latter. Wybicki may have even hoped for Kościuszko to arrive in Italy and personally lead the Legions, which might explain why the chorus "March, march, Dąbrowski" is not repeated after the last stanza. At that time, Wybicki was not yet aware that Kościuszko had already returned to Philadelphia.

=== Rising popularity ===
The song became popular in Poland as early as late 1797 and quickly became an object of variations and modifications. A variant from 1798 introduced some stylistic changes, which have since become standard, such as replacing nie umarła ('not dead') with nie zginęła ('not perished') or do Polski z ziemi włoski ('to Poland from the Italian land') with z ziemi włoskiej do Polski ('from the Italian land to Poland'). It also added four new stanzas, now forgotten, written from the viewpoint of Polish patriots waiting for General Dąbrowski to bring freedom and human rights to Poland.

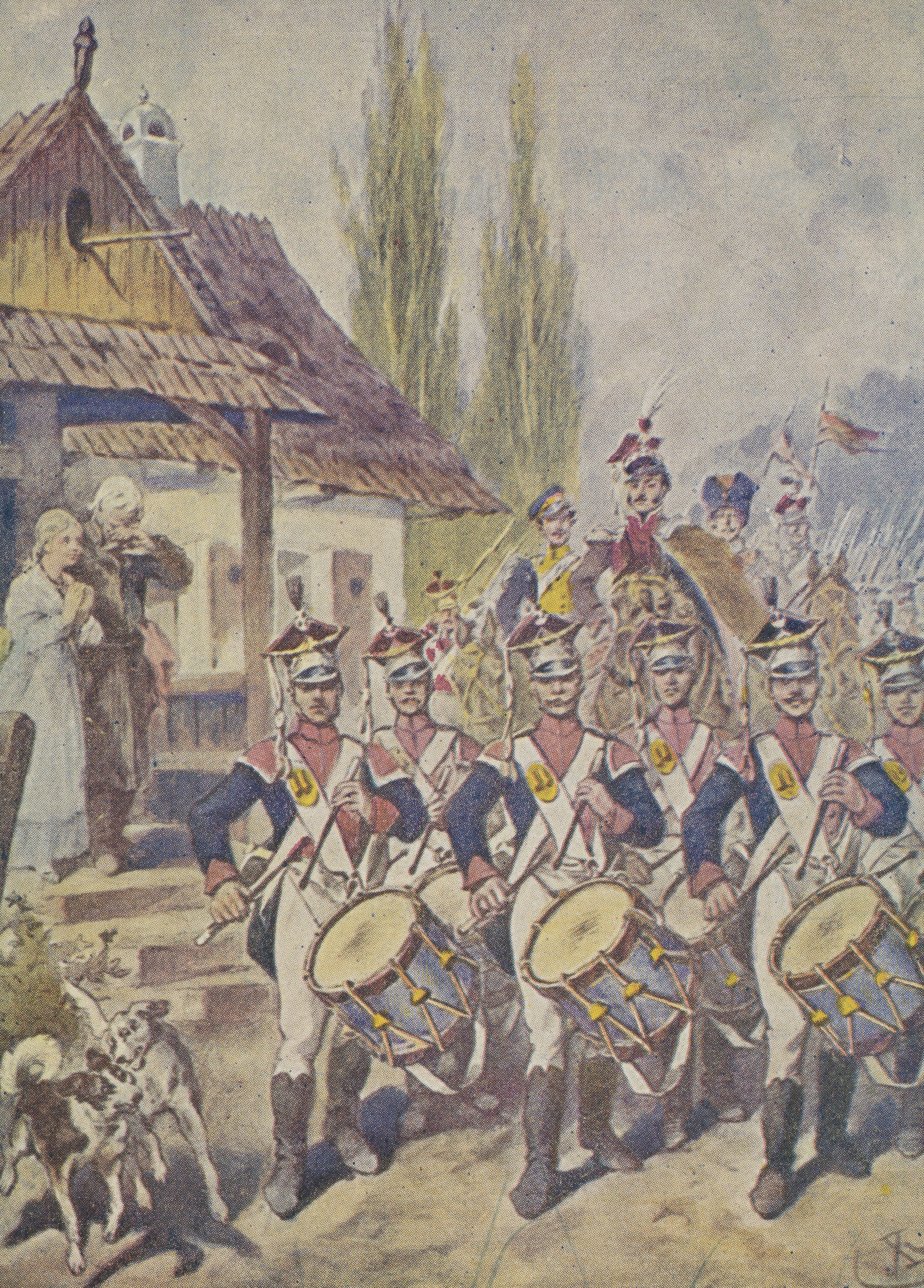
Father, in tears, says to his Basia...

The ultimate fate of the Polish Legions in Italy was different from that promised by Wybicki's song. Rather than coming back to Poland, they were exploited by the French government to quell uprisings in Italy, Germany and, later, in Haiti where they were decimated by war and disease. Polish national hopes were revived with the outbreak of the Franco-Prussian War (part of the War of the Fourth Coalition) in 1806. Napoleon called Dąbrowski and Wybicki to come back from Italy and help gather support for the French army in Polish-populated parts of Prussia. On 6 November 1806, both generals arrived in Poznań, enthusiastically greeted by locals singing "Poland Is Not Yet Lost". The ensuing Greater Poland Uprising and Napoleon's victory over Russian forces at Friedland led to the creation of a French-controlled Polish puppet state known as the Duchy of Warsaw.

"Poland Is Not Yet Lost" was one of the most popular patriotic songs in the duchy, stopping short of becoming that entity's national anthem. Among other occasions, it was sung in Warsaw on 16 June 1807 to celebrate the battle of Friedland, in Kraków as it was liberated by Prince Józef Poniatowski on 19 July 1809, and at a ball in Warsaw on 23 December 1809, the birthday of Frederick Augustus, King of Saxony and Duke of Warsaw. On the occasion of Dąbrowski's name day on 25 December 1810 in Poznań, Dąbrowski and Wybicki led the mazurka to the tune of "Poland Is Not Yet Lost". Although the melody of Wybicki's song remained unchanged and widely known, the lyrics kept changing. With the signing of a Franco-Russian alliance at Tilsit in 1807, the fourth stanza, specifically mentioning Russians as Poland's enemies, was removed. The last stanza, referring to Kościuszko, who had grown suspicious of Napoleon and refused to lend his support to the emperor's war in Poland, met the same fate.

The blow struck with such skill, with such force unsurpassed,
That the strings rang out boldly, like trumpets of brass,
And from them to the heavens that song wafted, cherished,
That triumphal march: Poland has never yet perished!
...March Dąbrowski to Poland! – The audience entire
Clapped, and all "March Dąbrowski!" cried out as a choir.

— Adam Mickiewicz,
Pan Tadeusz (Book Twelve, Love and Friendship!)

The anthem is mentioned twice in Pan Tadeusz, the Polish national epic written by Adam Mickiewicz in 1834, but set in the years 1811–1812. The author makes the first reference to the song when Tadeusz, the main protagonist, returns home and, recalling childhood memories, pulls the string of a chiming clock to hear the "old Dąbrowski's Mazurka" once again. Music boxes and musical clocks playing the melody of Poland Is Not Yet Lost belonged to popular patriotic paraphernalia of that time. The song appears in the epic poem again when Jankiel, a Jewish dulcimerist and ardent Polish patriot, plays the mazurka in the presence of General Dąbrowski himself.

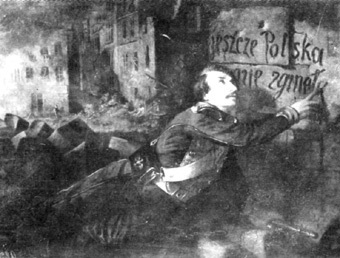
Charles Michel Guilbert d'Anelle, Expiring Soldier of Liberty (1849). The painting shows a dying freedom fighter scrawling "Poland is not yet lost" in his blood.

With Napoleon's defeat and the Congress of Vienna in 1815 came a century of foreign domination over Poland interspersed with occasional bursts of armed rebellion. "Poland Is Not Yet Lost" continued to be sung throughout that period, especially during national uprisings. During the November Uprising against Russia in 1830–1831, the song was chanted in the battlefields of Stoczek, Olszynka Grochowska, and Iganie. In peacetime, Polish patriots performed it at homes, official functions and political demonstrations. New variants of the song, of various artistic value and length of life, abounded. At least 16 alternative versions were penned during the November Uprising alone. At times, Dąbrowski's name was replaced by other national heroes: from Józef Chłopicki during the November Uprising to Józef Piłsudski during the First World War to Władysław Sikorski during the Second World War. New lyrics were also written in regional dialects of Polish, from Silesia to Ermland and Masuria. A variant known as "Marsz Polonii" ('March of Polonia') spread among Polish immigrants in the Americas.

Mass political emigration following the defeat of the November Uprising, known as the Great Emigration, brought "Poland Is Not Yet Lost" to Western Europe. It soon found favor from Britain to France to Germany, where it was performed as a token of sympathy with the Polish cause. It was also highly esteemed in Central Europe, where various, mostly Slavic, peoples struggling for their own independence, looked to the Polish anthem for inspiration. Back in Poland, however, especially in the parts under Russian and Prussian rule, it was becoming increasingly risky to sing the anthem in public. Polish patriotic songs were banned in Prussia in 1850; between 1873 and 1911, German courts passed 44 sentences for singing such songs, 20 of which were specifically for singing "Poland Is Not Yet Lost". When Poland was part of the Russian Empire, public performance of the song often ended with police intervention.

=== Choice of national anthem ===
When Poland re-emerged as an independent state after World War I in 1918, it had to decide on its national symbols. While the coat of arms and the flag were officially adopted as early as 1919, the question of a national anthem had to wait. Apart from "Poland Is Not Yet Lost", there were other popular patriotic songs that could compete for the status of an official national anthem.

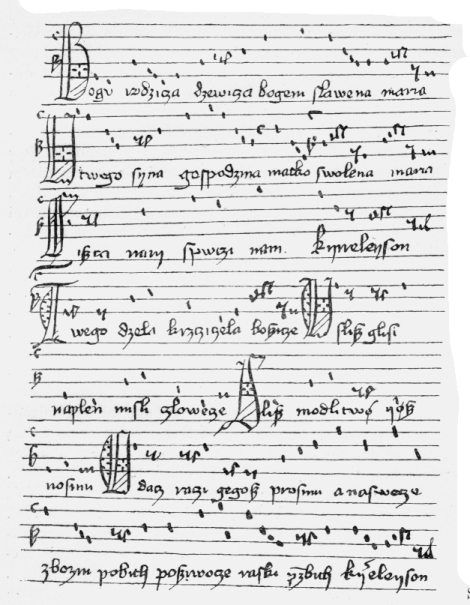
Sheet music for Bogurodzica from 1407

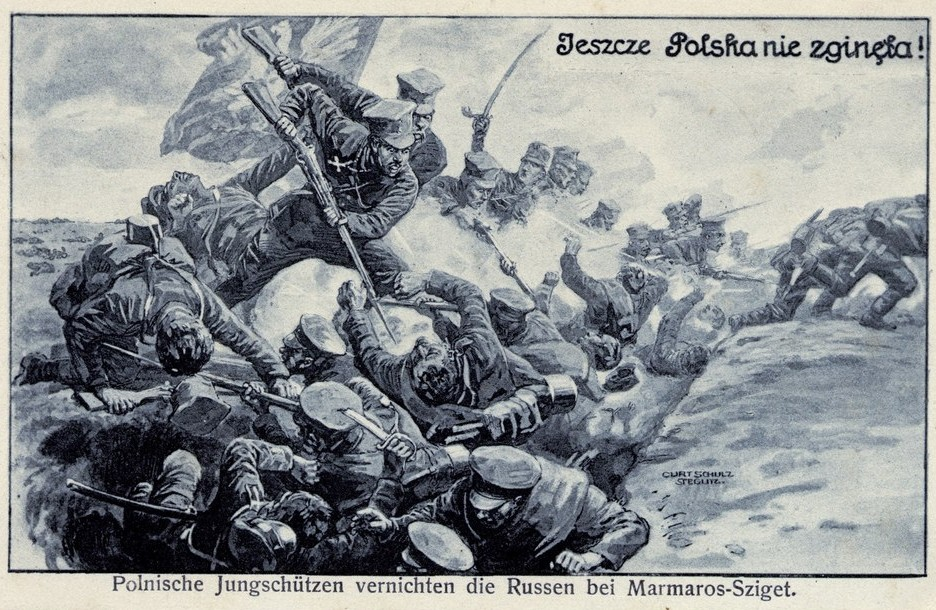
Poland is Not Yet Lost!

In the Middle Ages, the role of a national anthem was played by hymns. Among them were "Bogurodzica" ('Mother of God'), one of the oldest (11th–12th century) known literary texts in Polish, and the Latin "Gaude Mater Polonia" ('Rejoice, Mother Poland'), written in the 13th century to celebrate the canonization of Bishop Stanislaus of Szczepanów, the patron saint of Poland. Both were chanted on special occasions and on battlefields. The latter is sung nowadays at university ceremonies. During the Renaissance and the Enlightenment, several songs, both religious and secular, were written with the specific purpose of creating a new national anthem. Examples include the 16th-century Latin prayer Oratio pro Republica et Rege ('Prayer for the Commonwealth and the King') by a Calvinist poet, Andrzej Trzeciński, and "Hymn do miłości Ojczyzny" ('Hymn to the Love of the Fatherland') written in 1744 by Prince-Bishop Ignacy Krasicki. They failed, however, to win substantial favor with the populace. Another candidate was "Bóg się rodzi" ('God Is Born'), whose melody was originally a 16th-century coronation polonaise (dance) for Polish kings.

The official anthem of the Russian-controlled Congress Kingdom of Poland was "Pieśń narodowa na pomyślność Króla" (lit. 'National Song to the King's Prosperity') written in 1816 by Alojzy Feliński and Jan Kaszewski. Initially unpopular, it evolved in the early 1860s into an important religious and patriotic hymn. The final verse, which originally begged "Save, O Lord, our King", was substituted with "Return us, O Lord, our free Fatherland" while the melody was replaced with that of a Marian hymn. The result, known today as "Boże, coś Polskę" (from the first lines "Boże! Coś Polskę przez tak liczne wieki / Otaczał blaskiem potęgi i chwały...", "Lord! Who for so many ages enclosed Poland with the light of power and glory..."), has been sung in Polish churches ever since, with the final verse alternating between "Return..." and "Bless, O Lord, our free Fatherland", depending on Poland's political situation.

A national song that was particularly popular during the November Uprising was "Warszawianka", originally written in French as "La Varsovienne" by Casimir Delavigne, with melody by Karol Kurpiński. The song praised Polish insurgents taking their ideals from the French July Revolution of 1830. A peasant rebellion against Polish nobles, which took place in western Galicia in 1846 and was encouraged by Austrian authorities who wished to thwart a new uprising attempt, moved Kornel Ujejski to write a mournful chorale entitled "Z dymem pożarów" ('With the Smoke of Fires'). With the music composed by Józef Nikorowicz, it became one of the most popular national songs of the time, although it declined into obscurity during the 20th century. In 1908, Maria Konopnicka and Feliks Nowowiejski created "Rota" ('Oath'), a song protesting against the oppression of the Polish population of the German Empire, who were subject to eviction from their land and forced assimilation. First publicly performed in 1910, during a quincentennial celebration of the Polish–Lithuanian victory over the Teutonic Knights at Grunwald, it too became one of the most treasured national Polish songs.

At the inauguration of the United Nations in 1945, no delegation from Poland had been invited. (Note: By the Polish government-in-exile being an original signatory of the Declaration by United Nations which pledged itself to the principles embodied in the Atlantic Charter, Poland is recognized as a founding member state of the United Nations. But a representative of a Polish government did not sign the United Nations Charter during the United Nations Conference on International Organization. A Polish delegation was not permitted to be seated. The Provisional Government of the Republic of Poland did not recognize the Polish government-in-exile. By 1945-06-05, both the U.S and U.K. governments withdrew their recognition of the Polish government-in-exile as the legitimate government of Poland. Poland was the 51st nation to sign the United Nations Charter on 1945-10-15.) The Polish pianist Artur Rubinstein, who was to perform the opening concert at the inauguration, began the concert by stating his deep disappointment that the conference did not have a delegation from Poland. Rubinstein later described becoming overwhelmed by a blind fury and angrily pointing out to the public the absence of the Polish flag. He then sat down to the piano and played "Poland Is Not Yet Lost" loudly and slowly, repeating the final part in a great thunderous forte. When he had finished, the public rose to their feet and gave him a great ovation.

Over 60 years later, on 22 September 2005, Aleksander Kwaśniewski, President of Poland, said:

For the UN is rightly criticised for being anachronistic, for reflecting the old world that is drifting away into the past. Particularly we, the Polish people, and all the nations of Central and Eastern Europe find it difficult to forget about that. The UN idea dates back to 1943; to the meeting of the "Big Three" in Tehran; to the illusions that Roosevelt harboured about Stalin, benevolently nicknamed "Uncle Joe". As a result, the road to San Francisco led via Yalta. And even though Poland had made a major contribution to the victory which put an end to the Second World War, in June 1945 a representative of our country was not allowed to put his signature to the United Nations Charter. We remember that event when Artur Rubinstein, seeing that there was no Polish delegation at the concert to mark the signing of the Charter, decided to play the Dąbrowski Mazurka, Poland's national anthem, to demonstrate that "Poland was not lost yet", that Poland lived on. I am recalling this because I had a very touching moment a few days ago in the same San Francisco opera house, to which I was invited for the opening of the season. This time it was the orchestra that played the Dąbrowski Mazurka, and at that moment the memories of the great Artur Rubinstein and his performance came back with full force and it was very touching indeed for me. The UN is rooted in the Second World War and in the post-war situation; it reflects the balance of power of that era.

== Influence ==
During the European Revolutions of 1848, "Poland Is Not Yet Lost" won favor throughout Europe as a revolutionary anthem. This led the Slovak poet Samo Tomášik to write the ethnic anthem, "Hej, Sloveni", based on the slowed melody of the Polish national anthem. It was later adopted by the Prague Slavic Congress as the Pan-Slavic Anthem. During the Second World War, a translation of this anthem became the national anthem of Yugoslavia, and later, Serbia and Montenegro. The similarity of the anthems sometimes confused these countries' football or volleyball matches. However, after the 2006 split between the two, neither Serbia nor Montenegro kept the song as its national anthem, instead choosing "Bože pravde" and "Oj, svijetla majska zoro" respectively. The Polish national anthem is also notable for influencing the lyrics of the national anthem of Ukraine. The anthem is played on First Programme of Polish Radio every day at midnight.

The line Poland is not yet lost has become proverbial in some languages. For example, in German, noch ist Polen nicht verloren is a common saying meaning all is not lost'. In Swedish, the similar phrase än är inte Polen förlorat is also used in the same context.

Additionally, the Italian anthem "Il Canto degli Italiani" contains a reference to the Partitions of Poland by Prussia, Austria and Russia, due to the two countries' close relations.

== See also ==
- Boże, coś Polskę
- Warszawianka (1831)
- Gaude Mater Polonia
- Bogurodzica
