= Warszawianka (1831) =

Polish patriotic song

"Warszawianka 1831 roku"
English: "The Varsovian 1831"
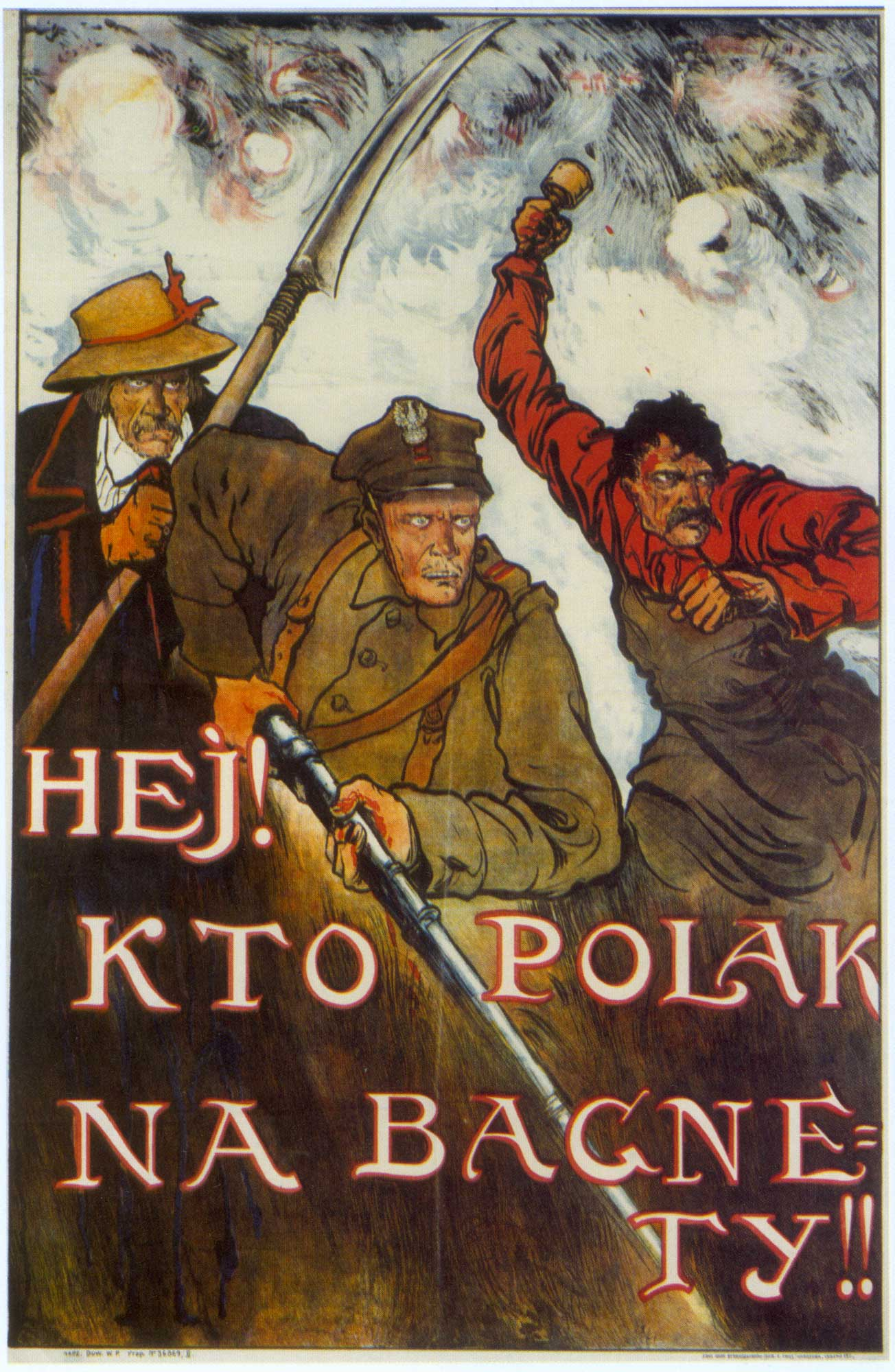
- The song's refrain on a poster from the times of the Polish–Soviet War
- Lyrics: Casimir François Delavigne, 1831
- Music: Karol Kurpiński, 1831

"Warszawianka 1831 roku", "La Varsovienne" ("The Varsovian of 1831") is a Polish patriotic song written by Casimir François Delavigne with music by Karol Kurpiński.

== History ==
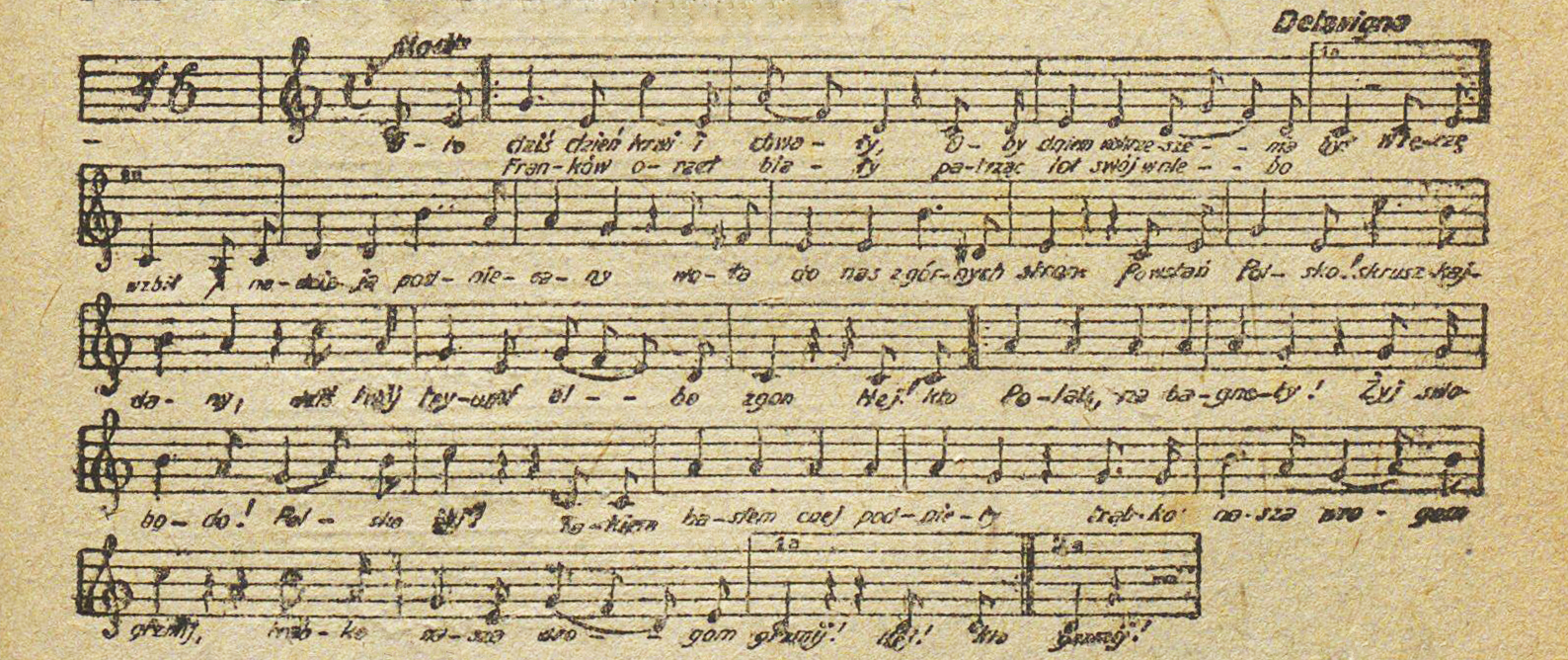
Notes of Warszawianka, taken from Piosenki leguna tułacza

The song was written in support of the November Uprising of 1830–1831. The French poet Casimir Delavigne was fascinated and inspired by the news of the uprising making its way to Paris and wrote the words, which were translated into Polish by the historian, journalist, and poet Karol Sienkiewicz (great-uncle of novelist Henryk Sienkiewicz).

It contains several stylistic allusions to "La Marseillaise" in the lyrics e.g. Aux armes, citoyens (in "La Varsovienne": Polonais, à la baïonnette). The song was performed for the first time on 5 April 1831 at the National Theatre in Warsaw and immediately started to enjoy great popularity.

The song is sometimes confused with a later Polish revolutionary song of the same name (often referred to in Polish as "Warszawianka 1905 roku" or ‘the Varsovienne of 1905’, sometimes known in English as "Whirlwinds of Danger"), which had its music used for the 1936 Spanish anarchist song "To the Barricades". It is today the official march past of the Polish Armed Forces. In 1918, after the regaining of independence by Poland, it was considered among the candidates for the country's national anthem.

== Lyrics ==
French
Il s'est levé, voici le jour sanglant;
Qu'il soit pour nous le jour de délivrance!
Dans son essor, voyez notre aigle blanc
Les yeux fixés sur l'arc-en-ciel de France
Au soleil de juillet, dont l'éclat fut si beau,
Il a repris son vol, il fend les airs, il crie:
"Pour ma noble patrie,
Liberté, ton soleil ou la nuit du tombeau!"

Refrain:
Polonais, à la baïonnette!
C'est le cri par nous adopté;
Qu'en roulant le tambour répète:
À la baïonnette!
Vive la liberté!

Guerre! À cheval, cosaques des déserts!
Sabrons, dit-il, la Pologne rebelle:
Point de Balkans, ses champs nous sont ouverts;
C'est le galop qu'il faut passer sur elle.
Halte! n'avancez pas! Ses Balkans sont nos corps;
La terre où nous marchons ne porte que des braves,
rejette les esclaves
Et de ses ennemis ne garde que les morts

Refrain

Pour toi, Pologne, ils combattront, tes fils,
Plus fortunés qu'au temps où la victoire
Mêlait leurs cendres aux sables de Memphis
Où le Kremlin s'écroula sous leur gloire:
Des Alpes au Thabor, de l'Ebre au Pont-Euxin,
Ils sont tombés, vingt ans, sur la rive étrangère.
Cette fois, ô ma mère!
Ceux qui mourront pour toi, dormiront sur ton sein.

Refrain

Viens Kosciusko, que ton bras frappe au cœur
Cet ennemi qui parle de clémence;
En avait-il quand son sabre vainqueur
Noyait Praga dans un massacre immense?
Tout son sang va payer le sang qu'il prodigua,
cette terre en a soif, qu'elle en soit arrosée;
Faisons, sous sa rosée,
Reverdir le laurier des martyrs de Praga.

Refrain

Allons, guerriers, un généreux effort!
Nous les vaincrons; nos femmes les défient.
O mon pays, montre au géant du nord
Le saint anneau qu'elles te sacrifient.
Que par notre victoire il soit ensanglanté;
Marche, et fais triompher au milieu des batailles
L'anneau des fiançailles,
Qui t'unit pour toujours avec la liberté.

Refrain

À nous, Français! Les balles d'Iéna
Sur ma poitrine ont inscrit mes services;
À Marengo, le fer la sillonna;
De Champ-Aubert comptez les cicatrices.
Vaincre et mourir ensemble autrefois fut si doux!
Nous étions sous Paris... Pour de vieux frères d'armes
N'aurez-vous que des larmes?
Frères, c'était du sang que nous versions pour vous!

Refrain

O vous, du moins, dont le sang glorieux
S'est, dans l'exil, répandu comme l'onde,
Pour nous bénir, mânes victorieux,
Relevez-vous de tous les points du monde!
Qu'il soit vainqueur, ce peuple; ou martyr comme vous,
Sous le bras du géant, qu'en mourant il retarde,
Qu'il tombe à l'avant-garde,
Pour couvrir de son corps la liberté de tous.

Refrain

Sonnez, clairons! Polonais, à ton rang!
Suis sous le feu ton aigle qui s'élance.
La liberté bat la charge en courant,
Et la victoire est au bout de ta lance.
Victoire à l'étendard que l'exil ombragea
Des lauriers d'Austerlitz, des palmes d'Idumée!
Pologne bien-aimée,
Qui vivra sera libre, et qui meurt l'est déjà!

Refrain

Polish
Oto dziś dzień krwi i chwały,
Oby dniem wskrzeszenia był!
W tęczę Franków Orzeł Biały
Patrząc, lot swój w niebo wzbił.
Słońcem lipca podniecany
Woła do nas z górnych stron:
"Powstań, Polsko, skrusz kajdany,
Dzis twój tryumf albo zgon!"

Refren:
Hej, kto Polak, na bagnety!
Żyj, swobodo, Polsko, żyj!
Takim hasłem cnej podniety
Trąbo nasza wrogom grzmij!
Trąbo nasza wrogom grzmij!

Na koń, woła Kozak mściwy,
Karać bunty polskich rot,
Bez Bałkanów są ich niwy,
Wszystko jeden zgniecie lot.
Stój! Za Bałkan pierś ta stanie,
Car wasz marzy płonny łup,
Z wrogów naszych nie zostanie,
Na tej ziemi, chyba trup.

Refren

Droga Polska, dzieci Twoje,
Dziś szczęśliwszych doszły chwil,
Od tych sławnych, gdy ich boje,
Wieńczył Kremlin, Tybr i Nil.
Lat dwadzieścia nasze męże,
Los po obcych ziemiach siał,
Dziś, o Matko, kto polęże,
Na Twem łonie będzie spał.

Refren

Wstań Kościuszko! Ugodź serca,
Co z litością mamić śmią,
Znałże litość ów morderca,
Który Pragę zalał krwią?
Niechaj krew tę krwią dziś spłaci,
Niech nią zrosi grunt, zły gość,
Laur męczeński naszej braci
Bujniej będzie po niej rość.

Refren

Tocz Polaku bój zacięty,
Ulec musi dumny car,
Pokaż jemu pierścień święty,
Nieulękłych Polek dar,
Niech to godło ślubów drogich,
Wrogom naszym wróży grób,
Niech krwią zlane w bojach srogich,
Nasz z wolnością świadczy ślub.

Refren

O Francuzi! Czyż bez ceny
Rany nasze dla was są?
Spod Marengo, Wagram, Jeny,
Drezna, Lipska, Waterloo
Świat was zdradzał, my dotrwali,
Śmierć czy tryumf, my gdzie wy!
Bracia, my wam krew dawali.
Dziś wy dla nas nic – prócz łzy.

Refren

Wy przynajmniej coście legli,
W obcych krajach za kraj swój,
Bracia nasi z grobów zbiegli,
Błogosławcie bratni bój.
Lub zwyciężym – lub gotowi,
Z trupów naszych tamę wznieść,
By krok spóźnić olbrzymowi,
Co chce światu pęta nieść.

Refren

Grzmijcie bębny, ryczcie działa,
Dalej! dzieci w gęsty szyk,
Wiedzie hufce wolność, chwała,
Tryumf błyska w ostrzu pik.
Leć nasz orle, w górnym pędzie,
Sławie, Polsce, światu służ!
Kto przeżyje wolnym będzie,
Kto umiera, wolny już!

Refren

English translation of the Polish version
Today is a day of blood and glory,
Let it be a day of resurrection!
Gazing at France's rainbow,
The White Eagle launches into flight.
Inspired by the sun of July,
He calls to us from above:
"Arise, oh Poland, break your chains,
Today is a day of your victory or death!"

Refrain:
Hey, whoever is a Pole, to your bayonets!
Live, freedom, oh Poland, live!
Let this worthy battle cry
Sound forth to our foes!
Sound forth to our foes!

"To horse!" - a vindictive Cossack calls,
Punish the Polish mutinied companies,
Their fields have no Balkans,
In a trice we shall crush poles a sort».
Stand! This breast will stand for the Balkans:
Your tsar vainly dreams of loot,
From our enemies nothing remains
On this ground, except for corpses.

Refrain

Dear Poland! Today your children
Have reached happier moments,
Than those when their famous battles
Were crowned by the Kremlin, Tiber and Nile.
For twenty years our heroes
have been scattered by fate over foreign lands,
Now, oh Mother, he who is killed,
Shall sleep on your bosom.

Refrain

Rise, Kościuszko, strike in hearts,
Which dare to deceive with mercy.
Did that murderer know about mercy,
Which bathed Praga in blood?
Let he now repay for that blood in blood,
Let he, a malicious visitor, sprinkle it over the ground.
Martyr laurels of our brethren
Will grow more magnificent on it.

Refrain

Fight, oh Pole, a pitched battle,
The proud tsar must lose,
Show him a sacred ring,
A gift of fearless Polish women;
Let this sign of dear vows
Prophesy grave to our enemies,
Let it, bathed in blood in severe fights,
Witness our union with freedom.

Refrain

Oh Frenchmen! Are our wounds
Of no value for you?
At Marengo, Wagram, Jena,
Dresden, Leipzig, and Waterloo
The world betrayed you, but we stood firm.
In death or victory, we stand by you!
Oh brothers, we gave blood for you.
Today you give us nothing but tears.

Refrain

You, at least, who have fallen
In foreign lands for your land,
Our brothers, risen from tombs,
Bless your brothers' fight!
Either we win – or we are ready
To build a barrier of our corpses,
To slow down the giant,
Who wishes to bring chains to the world.

Refrain

Rattle, drums, roar, guns,
On! Children, form a deep line;
Freedom and Glory lead the regiments
Triumph shines on spearheads.
Fly, our eagle, in high flight,
Serve the glory, Poland, and the world!
He who survives will be free,
He who dies is already free!

Refrain

== See also ==
- Poland Is Not Yet Lost
- Boże, coś Polskę
- Gaude Mater Polonia
- Bogurodzica
- Whirlwinds of Danger
- Music of Poland
