= Gustaw Ehrenberg =

Polish poet

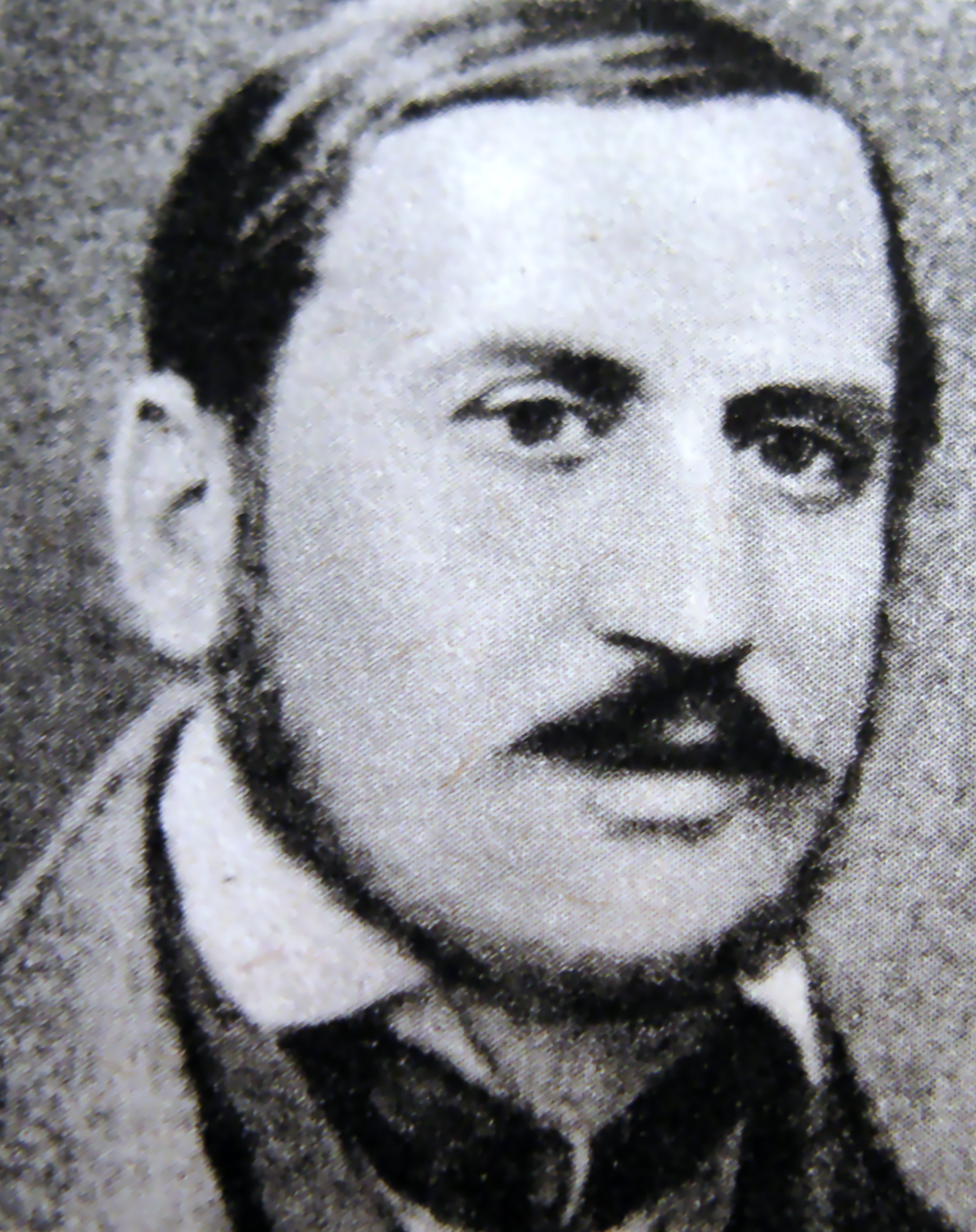
Gustaw Ehrenberg

Gustaw Ehrenberg (14 February 1818 in Warsaw – 28 September 1895 in Kraków) was a Polish poet. He spent a significant part of his life in exile in Siberia and was an illegitimate son of Tsar Alexander I of Russia.
