= Rota (poem) =

Polish poem and anthem

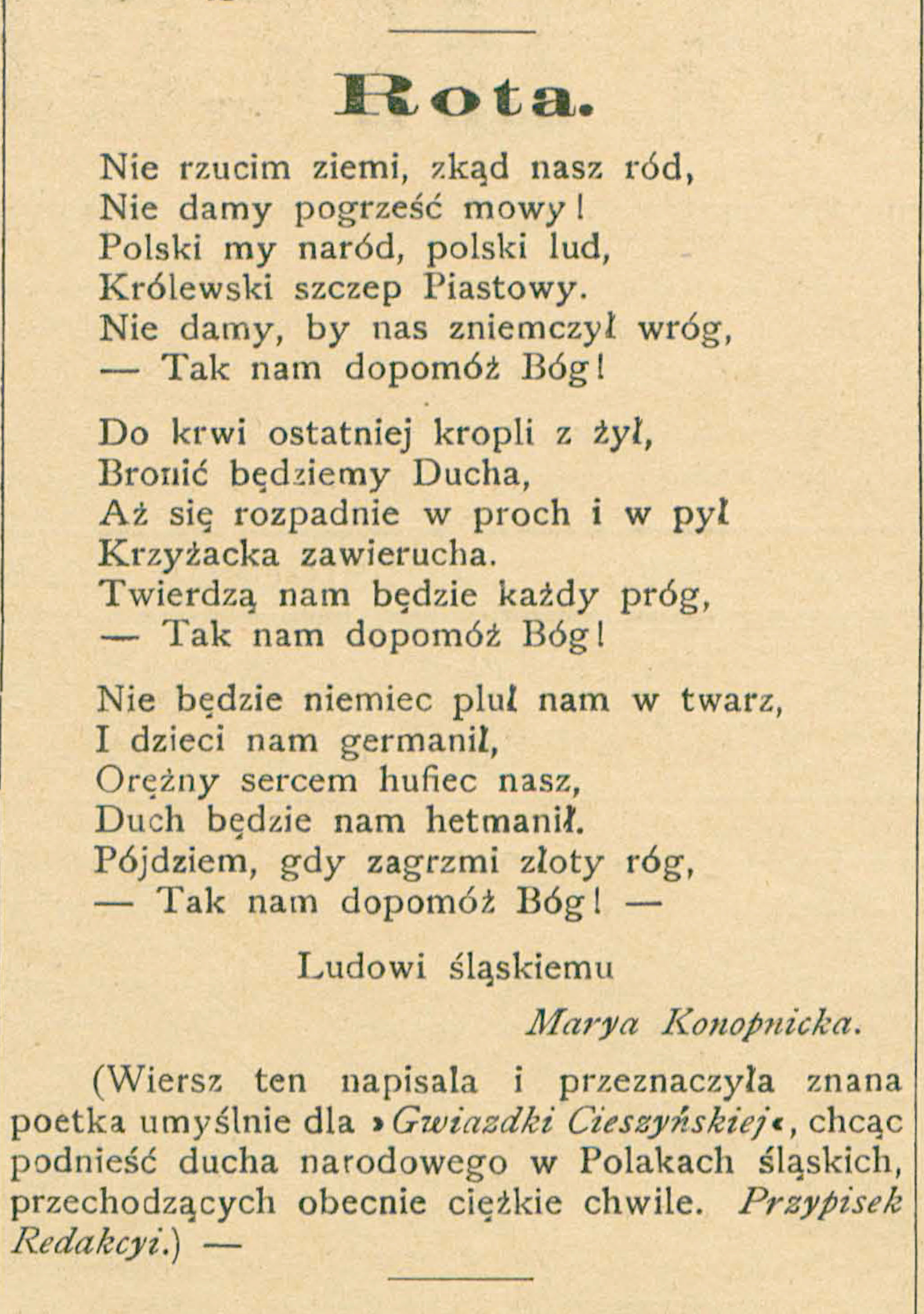
Original text from 1908

The Rota played from the tower of the Main City Hall in Gdańsk

Rota ("Oath") is an early-20th-century Polish poem and celebratory anthem, once proposed to be the Polish national anthem. The Rota's lyrics were written in 1908 by the Polish-independence activist, poet Maria Konopnicka, as a protest against the German Empire's policy of forced Germanization of Poles.

Konopnicka wrote the Rota in 1908 while staying in Cieszyn. The poem was first published in the newspaper Gwiazdka Cieszyńska (The Cieszyn Star) on 7 November 1908. The music to it was composed two years later by composer, conductor, and concert organist Feliks Nowowiejski.

== History ==
Konopnicka's poem came into being as a protest against the German Empire's oppression and suppression of Polish culture in German-annexed western Poland — lands that from years 1772 and 1793–95 (after the three partitions of the Polish-Lithuanian Commonwealth) to 1918 were under Prussian — and later, German — rule. During the Prussian and German rule, German political leaders like Otto von Bismarck, Eugen von Puttkammer and thinkers like Eduard von Hartmann campaigned for policy of ausrotten (literally "uprooting", i.e. extermination – the same term was decades later used by Nazi Germany in describing what must be done with Jews) of Poles and Rota was written as a reply to this campaign.

Rota was first sung publicly during a patriotic demonstration in Kraków on July 15, 1910, held to commemorate the 500th anniversary of the Polish-Lithuanian victory over the Teutonic Knights at the Battle of Grunwald. The anthem quickly became popular across partitioned Poland. Until 1918, the Rota served as the anthem of the Polish Scouting movement. Between 1920 and 1922 the piece was chosen as state anthem of the Republic of Central Lithuania, a puppet state fully dependent on the Second Polish Republic (i.e. interwar Poland); while in Poland proper it was seriously considered as a possible national anthem too – among the other several different poems which the post-1926 government led by Józef Piłsudski thought over – as it was associated with anti-German struggles from the late 19th century. (Rota was promoted especially by political right which saw the proposed We Are the First Brigade of the Pilsudski legion as too partisan and was lackluster on Poland Is Not Yet Lost.) In the end, however, the last song was chosen (today's Polish anthem).

During the German occupation of Poland in World War II, on the eve of 11 November 1939 (Polish Independence Day), in Zielonka, a town at the outskirts of Warsaw, the scouts from the Polish Scouting Association put up posters with the text of the poem on the walls of the buildings. In reprisal, German occupying forces carried out an execution of 9 scouts and other inhabitants of the town. The Communists also retained the same national anthem as well as Rota, making it the official anthem of the 1st Tadeusz Kościuszko Infantry Division.

At the turn of the 1980s and 1990s of the 20th century, this composition was considered as the anthem of proposed Polish National-Territorial Region within the Lithuanian SSR. After 1989, Rota became the official anthem of the Polish People's Party. Until 2003, the melody of the anthem was played by the Gdańsk carillon tower and served as the signature theme of the television stations TVP Poznań and TVP Gdańsk. In 2010, Rota and its author Konopnicka were honored by a special resolution of the Polish Sejm. Rota is also the official anthem of League of Polish Families political party.

From May 2024, an autograph score of the composition (prepared for publication in 1910) is presented at a permanent exhibition in the Palace of the Commonwealth in Warsaw.

== Text and translation ==
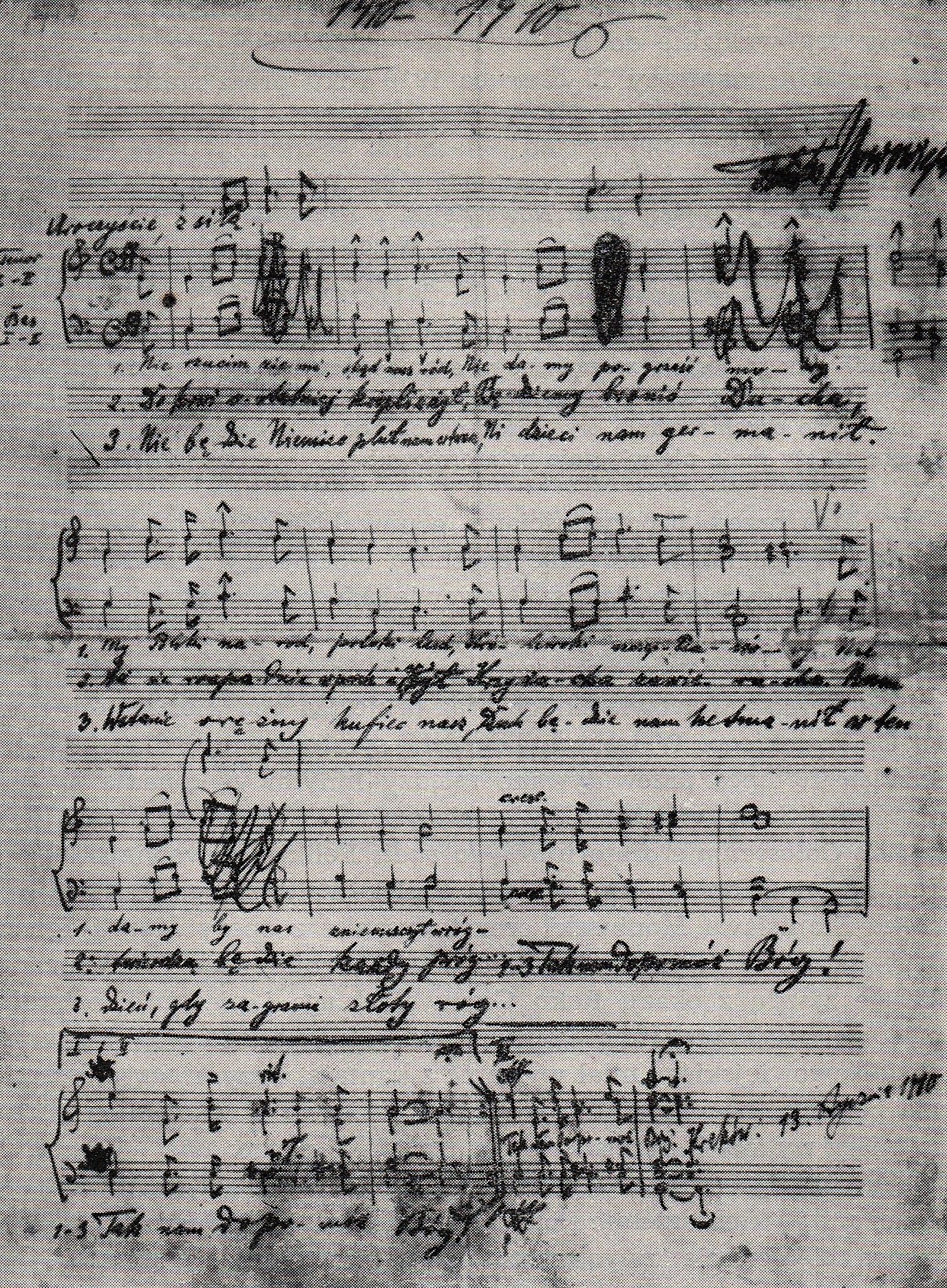
Musical manuscript of Rota by Feliks Nowowiejski, from the Jagiellonian Library collection.

Nie rzucim ziemi, skąd nasz ród.
Nie damy pogrześć mowy.
Polski my naród, polski lud,
Królewski szczep piastowy.
Nie damy, by nas gnębił wróg.

Tak nam dopomóż Bóg!
Tak nam dopomóż Bóg!

Do krwi ostatniej kropli z żył
Bronić będziemy Ducha,
Aż się rozpadnie w proch i w pył
Krzyżacka zawierucha.
Twierdzą nam będzie każdy próg.

Tak nam dopomóż Bóg!
Tak nam dopomóż Bóg!

Nie będzie niemiec pluł nam w twarz
Ni dzieci nam germanił,
Orężny wstanie hufiec nasz,
Duch będzie nam hetmanił.
Pójdziem, gdy zagrzmi złoty róg.

Tak nam dopomóż Bóg!
Tak nam dopomóż Bóg!

Nie damy miana Polski zgnieść
Nie pójdziem żywo w trumnę.
Na Polski imię, na jej cześć
Podnosim czoła dumne,
Odzyska ziemię dziadów wnuk.

Tak nam dopomóż Bóg!
Tak nam dopomóż Bóg!

Translation:

We won't forsake the land we came from,
We won't let our speech be buried.
We are the Polish nation, the Polish people,
From the royal line of Piast.
We won't let the enemy oppress us.

So help us God!
So help us God!

To the last blood drop in our veins
We will defend our Spirit
Till into dust and ash shall fall,
The Teutonic windstorm.
Every doorsill shall be a fortress.

So help us God!
So help us God!

The German won't spit in our face,
Nor Germanise our children,
Our host will rise in arms,
The spirit will lead the way.
We shall go when sounds the golden horn.

So help us God!
So help us God!

We won't have Poland's name defamed,
We won't step alive into a coffin.
In Poland's name, in her honor
We lift our foreheads proudly,
The grandson will regain his forefathers' land

So help us God!
So help us God!

== See also ==
- Polish Army oaths
- Lebensraum
- Expulsion of Poles by Germany
- Germanisation
- Września children strike
- Kulturkampf
- Drzymała's wagon
- Anti-Polish sentiment
- 11 listopada
