= Alojzy Feliński =

Polish writer

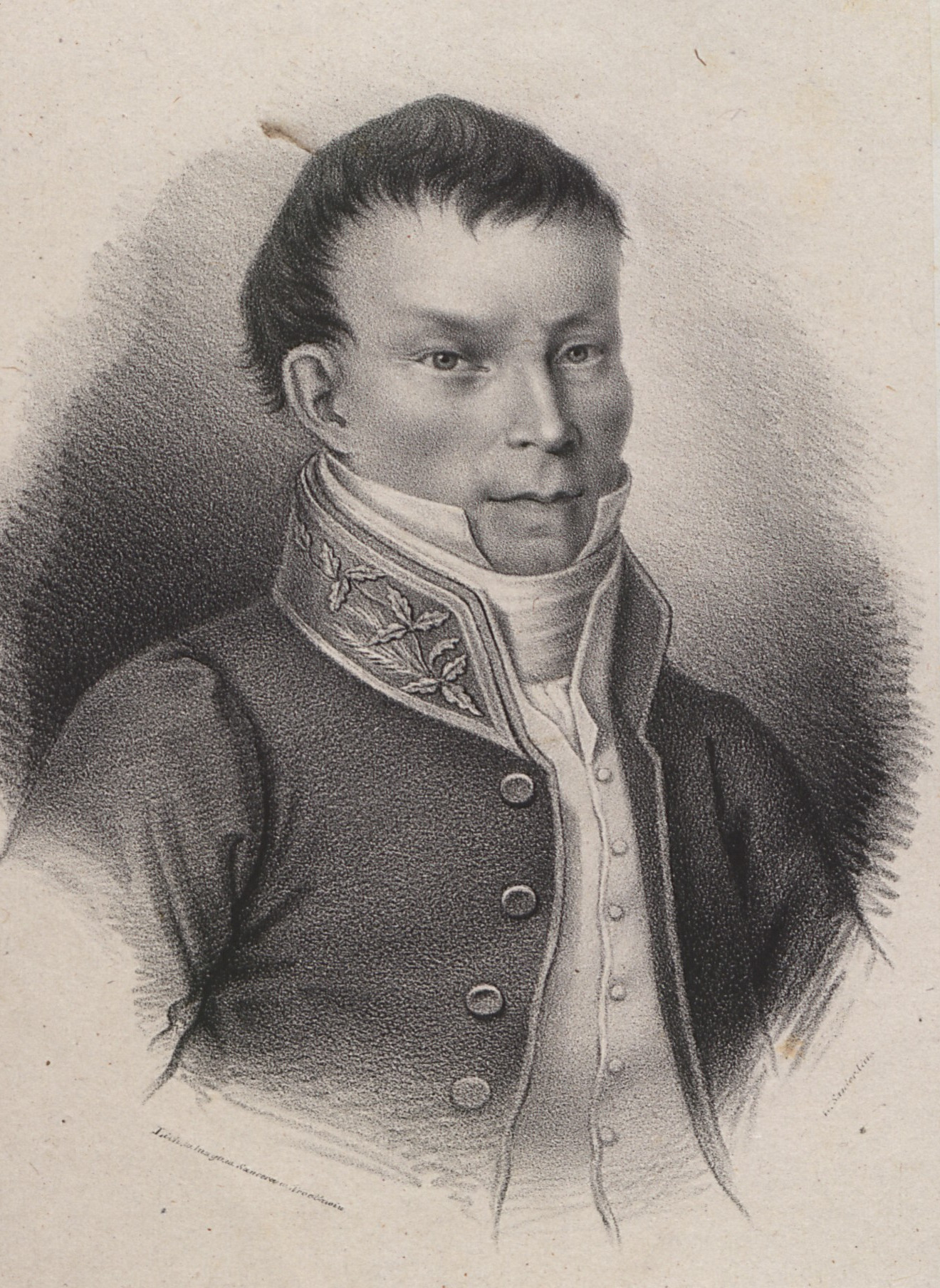
Alojzy Feliński.

Alojzy Feliński (1771–1820) was a Polish writer.

== Life ==
Feliński was born in Łuck. In his childhood he met Tadeusz Czacki. He was educated by the Piarists in Dąbrownica, later in Włodzimierz Wołyński. In 1778 he settled in Lublin, where he became a close companion of Kajetan Koźmian. Having resigned from the Bar together with Tadeusz Czacki, in 1779 he entered Parliament in Warsaw, where he became acquainted with many contemporary writers from Jacek Małachowski’s circle of friends. During the Kościuszko Insurrection, Feliński was Tadeusz Kościuszko’s secretary for French correspondence as well as the law and order commissar in Wołyń. After the defeat of the Insurrection he stayed at the Tarnowskis’ in Dzików, in 1795 he returned to Wołyń to manage his estate. In 1809 the author became a member of the Society of the Friends of Science. In 1815 he went to live in Warsaw and joined the circle of classicists. In 1818 he moved to Krzemieniec, where he took up the position of professor in the Krzemieniec Lyceum, where he subsequently became the headmaster. In 1819 he was granted honorary membership of Vilna University. He died in Krzemieniec.

== Work ==
Feliński was a representative of the classicism typical of the time after Stanisław Poniatowski’s reign. One of his major works was the tragedy Barbara Radziwiłłówna (1817), regarded as a masterpiece of classicist poetics; he translated Dellile’s poem entitled The Landlord or the French Landowners. He often spoke about Polish orthography, entering into a polemic on the subject with Jan Śniadecki, who advocated traditional spelling.

Hymn, written in honour of Tsar Alexander I on the occasion of the first anniversary of the Congress Kingdom of Poland was published on 20 July 1816 in Gazeta Warszawska (The Warsaw Gazette). It was emphasised that the hymn "was written in the spirit of the English God Save the King. The fact was also mentioned that "His Imperial Highness Grand Duke Konstanty condescended to express his contentment to the author. Captain Kaszewski from the Fourth Infantry Regiment composed appropriate music to this hymn." The hymn was performed during religious and patriotic celebrations; the music was later changed to the tune of a popular hymn: Bądź pozdrowiona Panienko Maryjo ("We Hail Thee Virgin Mary") and later to that of Serdeczna Matko ("Sincere Mother"). Soon, however, the hopes connected with Tsar Alexander I and the text of the hymn itself began to be questioned. In 1817 there appeared a poem by Antoni Gorecki entitled Hymn do Boga o zachowanie wolności ("Hymn to God for the Preservation of Freedom"); in an anonymous version both texts were combined; in effect the words of the refrain "Lord, save our King!" were changed to "Lord, restore our fatherland to us!"

Feliński's Hymn underwent numerous transformations both in poetic paraphrases and anonymous poems and has been sung during patriotic and religious demonstrations practically to this date; the paraphrased version gained special importance for the leaders and supporters of the opposition at the time of the Polish People's Republic.
