= List of socialist songs =

This article contains three lists: songs of the socialist parties and movements, anthems of self-proclaimed socialist states, and musical movements that feature prominent socialist themes. Not all national anthems of socialist states are necessarily explicitly socialist, and many were in use at other time in a nation's history.

== Songs of socialist movements ==
Song	Writer(s)	Date	Country of origin	Notes
Le temps des cerises	Jean-Baptiste Clément	1866	France	Music by Antoine Renard. Became strongly associated with the Paris Commune of 1871, and has become a major socialist song in Francophone countries.
Sir de Fisch-Ton-Kan	Joseph Aurnaud	1870	France	
The Internationale	Eugène Pottier	1871	France	Regarded as the international anthem of the socialist movement. First intended to be sung to the tune of "La Marseillaise", Pierre De Geyter composed original music in 1888. It was used as the anthem of the USSR from 1922 to 1944.
Les Dances des Bombes	Louise Michel	1871	France	
Semaine Sanglante	Jean Baptiste Clément	1871	France	
The Standard of Revolt	Paul Brousse	1877	France	
Elle n'est pas morte!	Eugène Pottier	1886	France	
Workers' Hymn	Filippo Turati and Amintore Galli	1886	Italy	It is considered one of the most significant historical songs of the Italian workers' movement, and was banned by successive governments of the Kingdom of Italy, including during the First World War and Fascist Italy.
Bella Ciao	Mondina Workers	Late 19th century	Italy	Originally sung by farm workers to protest harsh working conditions, it was adapted by Italian partisans as an anti-fascist song, and is widely used by anti-fascists today.
Bandiera Rossa	Carlo Tuzzi	1908	Italy	Uses a traditional folk melody. Primarily known as a song of the Italian labor movement.
Fischia il vento	Matvei Blanter and Felice Cascione	1943	Italy	Adapted from the Russian song Katyusha by Italian partisan Felice Cascione as an anti-fascist song.
Rossa Palestina	Umberto Fiore	1973	Italy	Focused on the struggle of Palestinians in the Levant
La Letanía De Los Poderosos	Gabino Palomares	1978	Mexico	
Himno Zapatista		1990s	Mexico	Anthem of the Zapatista Army of National Liberation
Canción del Partido Comunista	Anthar Lopez	Unknown	Mexico	
Marcha de las Madres Latinas	José de Molina	1960s	Mexico	Altough originally composed by José de Molina for a play written by Vicente Leñero, this song would later become a popular hymn during the Mexican student movement of 1968.
Obreros y Patrones	José de Molina	1976	Mexico	
Corrido al EZLN	José de Molina	1995	Mexico	Written by José de Molina for his 1995 album De Chiapas con Amor in support of the Neozapatista movement, Corrido al EZLN along with other songs of Molina such as Ya Comenzó became popular amongst EZLN soldiers during the Zapatista uprising.
Canto Campesino	León Chavez	Unknown	Mexico	
Hold the Fort		Late 19th century	United States	Adapted by the Knights of Labor from a gospel hymn written by Philip Bliss. It became famous as the song of the British transportation workers. It is now used by many union movements, especially in the Caribbean.
The Preacher and the Slave	Joe Hill	1911	United States	Written as an anti-religious, syndicalist song for the IWW.
There Is Power in a Union	Joe Hill	1913	United States	Written for the IWW. Sung to the tune of Lewis E. Jones' 1899 hymn "There Is Power in the Blood (Of the Lamb)".
Rebel Girl	Joe Hill	1915	United States	Written for Elizabeth Gurley Flynn.
Bread and Roses	James Oppenheim	1915	United States	Multiple melodies have been composed, most famously by Mimi Fariña.
Solidarity Forever	Ralph Chaplin	1915	United States	Written for the Industrial Workers of the World (IWW), it is widely used in the trade union movement. It is sung to the tune of "John Brown's Body".
Workingmen Unite	E. S. Nelson	1919	United States	Set to the tune of the song "Red Wing".
Which Side Are You On?	Florence Reece	1931	United States	Written for the United Mine Workers in Harlan County, Kentucky from the melody from the traditional Baptist hymn, "Lay the Lily Low".
The Battle Hymn of Cooperation	Elizabeth Mead and Carl Ferguson	1932	United States	A popular song of the consumers' co-operatives movement, especially during the 1930s. Like "Solidarity Forever", it is also sung to the tune of "John Brown's Body".
Joe Hill	Alfred Hayes and Earl Robinson	1936	United States	Lyrics from a poem by Alfred Hayes.
This Land Is Your Land	Woody Guthrie	1944	United States	Guthrie wrote the song as a critical response to Irving Berlin's God Bless America. The stanza condemning private property is often omitted.
If I Had a Hammer	Pete Seeger and Lee Hays	1950	United States	First performed for the CPUSA, successful versions were recorded by The Weavers, Trini Lopez, and Peter, Paul, and Mary.
Love Me, I'm a Liberal	Phil Ochs	1966	United States	Mocks the insincerity of liberalism in the United States.
The Revolution Will Not Be Televised	Gil Scott-Heron	1971	United States	
Ain't done Nothin If You Ain't Been Called a Red	Eliot Kenin	1984	United States	The most famous version was sung by Faith Petric.
¡Ay Carmela!	Rolando Alarcon	1936	Spain	Sung by the Spanish Republicans during the Spanish Civil War.
Jarama Valley	Alex McDade	1938	Spain	Sung by the Spanish Republicans during the Spanish Civil War.
No Pasarán	Leopoldo González	1936	Spain	Titled after Dolores Ibarruri's famous speech during the Spanish Civil War.
A las Barricadas	Valeriano Orobón Fernández	1936	Spain	Used by the Spanish Anarchists during the Spanish Civil War.
Freiheit	Gudrun Kabisch and Paul Dessau	1936	Spain	Written by German volunteers of the Thälmann Battalion serving in the Spanish Civil War, it became popular among Communists in the United States and Germany.
Nanniwan	He Jingzhi and Ma Ke.	1943	China	Nanniwan celebrates a victory of the Communist Eighth Route Army during the Second World War. The lyrics, written by He Jingzhi, were set to a traditional folk melody of northern Shaanxi.
Osmanthus Flowers Blooming Everywhere in August			China	The song is based on a folk melody from the Dabie Mountains, where the Eyuwan Soviet was based. The song was very popular during the Cultural Revolution.
Ode to the Motherland	Wang Shen	1950	China	Dedicated to the Chinese Communist Revolution and the CCP.
The East Is Red	Li Youyuan	1960s	China	Written by a Chinese peasant from Shaanxi to celebrate Mao Zedong and the CCP. It became the de facto anthem of the PRC during the Cultural Revolution.
Sailing the Seas Depends on the Helmsman	Wang Shuangyin	1964	China	Popular among the Red Guards during the Cultural Revolution.
Without the Communist Party, There Would Be No New China	Cao Huoxing	1943	China	Written as a response to the Kuomintang slogan that "Without the Kuomintang, there would be no China".
Socialism is Good	Li Huanzhi and Xi Yang	1958	China	Popular during the Cultural Revolution.
The Voice of the Masses	Mohammed Abdel Wahab	1960	United Arab Republic	Pan-Arab song about uniting the Arab world through its people
Sar Oomad Zemestoon	Saeed Soltanpour		Iran	Used by the Organization of Iranian People's Fedai Guerrillas
Buruh Tani	Safi’i Kemamang	1996	Indonesia	Lyrics by Anarcho-punk group Marjinal. It became a common protest song in Indonesia against the New Order regime. Originally a socialist song, it has since been reclaimed by pro-democracy camps.
El Pueblo Unido	Sergio Ortega	1973	Chile	Lyrics by folk group Quilapayún. It was adapted from chants used during Salvador Allende's presidential campaign, and after he was deposed, it became a common protest song worldwide.
Venceremos	Sergio Ortega	1970	Chile	The anthem of Salvador Allende's presidential campaign.
Marcha del ERP	Unknown	1970s	Argentina	The official anthem of the People's Revolutionary Army, which was the military branch of the Worker's Revolutionary Party of Argentina.
Kominternlied	Franz Jahnke, Maxim Vallentin, and Hanns Eisler	1926 and 1928	Germany	Anthem of the Comintern, a Marxist-Leninist political international.
Solidaritätslied	Bertolt Brecht and Hanns Eisler	1929–31	Germany	Written during the Great Depression and popular among socialists in the late Weimar Republic.
Der heimliche Aufmarsch	Wladimir Vogel	1930	Germany	Lyrics are from a 1929 poem by Erich Weinert. The most famous version was arranged by Hans Eisler. In 1957, the words were rewritten in East Germany for the Cold War, renamed as "Der offene Aufmarsch".
Einheitsfrontlied	Hanns Eisler	1934	Germany	Also known as the "Song of the United Front". Lyrics by Bertolt Brecht.
Die Arbeiter von Wien	Fritz Brugel	1927	Austria	
Whirlwinds of Danger	Wacław Święcicki	1879 or 1883	Poland	Music composed by Józef Pławiński. The anthem of the Polish workers during the Russian Revolution of 1905, it has been translated into many languages and sung worldwide.
Łodzianka	Bolesław Zahorski	1909	Poland	Based on Whirlwinds of Danger and has the same melody. Is about Łódź insurrection.
You Fell Victim to a Fateful Struggle	Anton Arkhangelsky and Nikolay Ikonikov	1878	Russia	
Di Shvue	S. Ansky	1902	Russia	Written for the Jewish Labor Bund.
Dublin City 1913	Donagh MacDonagh		Ireland	Written about the Irish worker's struggle (1913-1916) against British occupation.
The Red Flag	Jim Connell	1889	United Kingdom	Written by Irish-born socialist Jim Connell, it is used as the party anthem of the British and Irish Labour parties. It is sung to the tune of "O Tannenbaum" or "The White Cockade".
The Manchester Rambler	Ewan MacColl	1932	United Kingdom	Written by the English folk singer Ewan MacColl, inspired by his participation in the Kinder trespass, a protest by the urban Young Communist League of Manchester.
Waiting for the Great Leap Forwards	Billy Bragg	1988	United Kingdom	Reflects on the disappointments of the Cold War in the aftermath of Prime Minister Margaret Thatcher's 1987 re-election.
Hasta Siempre	Carlos Puebla	1965	Cuba	Written as a response to Che Guevara's farewell letter to Cuba, it became the most famous song of the Nueva Trova movement.
Padaj silo i nepravdo		1922	Yugoslavia	Inspired by the Hvar Rebellion. It is based on "Slobodarka", a 1908 song written by Josip Smodlaka.
The Red Army Is the Strongest	Samuel Pokrass and Pavel Gorinshtejn	1920	USSR	
The Partisan's Song	Yuri Cherniavsky and Peter Parfenov	1915-1922	USSR	A popular Red Army song from the Russian Civil War and World War I.
Tachanka (song)	Mikhail Ruderman and Konstantin Listov	1937	USSR	Glorifies the Tachankas (machine gun carts) used by the Red Army during the civil war.
March of the Defenders of Moscow	Alexey Surkov and Boris Mokrousov	1941	USSR	Used by the Red Army beginning at the Battle of Moscow.

== National anthems of socialist states and territories ==
Song	Year adopted	Year relinquished	State	Writer	Composer
Aegukka	1947	In use	Korea, North	Pak Se-yong	Kim Won-gyun
Angola Avante	1975	In use	People's Republic of Angola	Manuel Rui Alves Monteiro	Rui Alberto Vieira Dias Mingas
Anthem of the People's Republic of Kampuchea	1979	1989	People's Republic of Kampuchea		Sok Udom Deth
L'Aube Nouvelle	1960	In use	People's Republic of Benin	Father Gilbert Jean Dagnon	Father Gilbert Jean Dagnon
Auferstanden aus Ruinen	1949	1990	East Germany	Johannes R. Becher	Hanns Eisler
Balgariyo mila	1951	1964	People's Republic of Bulgaria	Nikola Furnadzhiev, Mladen Isaev, and Elisaveta Bagriana	Georgi Dimitrov, Georgi Zlatev-Cherkin, and Svetoslav Obretenov
La Bayamesa	1909	In use	Cuba	Perucho Figueredo	
Dap Prampi Mesa Chokchey	1976	1979	Democratic Kampuchea		
Garam shah lā garam shah	1978	1992	Democratic Republic of Afghanistan	Sulaiman Layeq	Jalīl Ghahlānd
Hey, Slavs	1941	1992	Yugoslavia	Samuel Tomášik	
Himni i Flamurit	1912	In use	People's Socialist Republic of Albania	Asdreni	Ciprian Porumbescu
Kde domov můj	1918	1989, now in use as the anthem of Czech Republic	Czechoslovakia	Josef Kajetán Tyl	František Škroup
March of the Volunteers	1949	In use	China	Tian Han	Nie Er
Mila Rodino	1964	In use	People's Republic of Bulgaria	Tsvetan Radoslavov	Tsvetan Radoslavov
Nad Tatrou sa blýska	1918	1989, now in use as the anthem of Slovakia	Czechoslovakia	Janko Matúška	
State Anthem of the Mongolian People's Republic	1950	In use	Mongolian People's Republic	Tsendiin Damdinsüren	Bilegiin Damdinsüren and Luvsanjambyn Mördorj
Our Republic, Hail!	1947	1951	People's Republic of Bulgaria	Krum Penev	Georgi Dimitrov
Pe-al nostru steag e scris Unire	1975	1977	Socialist Republic of Romania	Andrei Bârseanu	Ciprian Porumbescu
Pheng Xat Lao	1945	In use	Laos	Sisana Sisane	Thongdy Sounthonevichit
Poland Is Not Yet Lost	1926	In use	Polish People's Republic	Józef Wybicki	
State Anthem of the Soviet Union	1944	1991, the melody now in use for the anthem of Russia	Soviet Union	Sergey Mikhalkov	Alexander Alexandrov
Te slăvim, Românie	1953	1975	Socialist Republic of Romania	Eugen Frunză and Dan Deșliu	Matei Socor
Tiến Quân Ca	1946	In use	Vietnam	Văn Cao	Văn Cao
Trei culori	1977	1990	Socialist Republic of Romania	Ciprian Porumbescu	Ciprian Porumbescu
Les Trois Glorieuses	1970	1991	People's Republic of the Congo	Jacques Tondra and Georges Kibanghi	Jean Royer and Joseph Spadilière
Viva, Viva a FRELIMO	1975	2002	People's Republic of Mozambique	Justino Sigaulane Chemane	Justino Sigaulane Chemane
Zdrobite cătușe	1948	1953	Romanian People's Republic	Aurel Baranga	Matei Socor

== Musical movements influenced by socialism ==
- Nhạc đỏ
- Nueva canción
  - Nueva trova
  - Nueva canción Chilena
  - Nova cançó
- Red song
- Music of the Chinese Cultural Revolution
- Songs of the Spanish Civil War
- Political hip-hop
- Protest songs
- Punk
- Trade union songs

== See also ==
- Little Red Songbook
- Mass song
- Music and politics
- Music of the Soviet Union
- People's Songs
- Punk ideologies
- Red Army Choir
- Revolutionary song
