= The Red Army Is the Strongest =

Soviet combat anthem

Krásnaya Ármiya vsekh sil'néy
English: The Red Army Is the Strongest
- Красная Армия всех сильней
- Red Army headgear insignia
- Combat anthem of the Soviet Union
- Lyrics: Pavel Gorinshtein
- Music: Samuel Pokrass
- Adopted: 1920
- Relinquished: 1991

"The Red Army Is the Strongest", (Note: Russian: Красная Армия всех сильней, romanized: Krásnaya Ármiya vsekh sil'néy, IPA: [ˈkrasnəjə ˈarmʲɪjə fsʲex sʲɪlʲˈnʲej]) popularly known by its incipit "White Army, Black Baron", (Note: Russian: Белая Армия, Чëрный Барон, romanized: Bélaya Ármiya, Chyórnyy Barón, IPA: [ˈbʲeləjə ˈarmʲɪjə ˈtɕɵrnɨj bɐˈron]) is a Soviet march song written by Pavel Gorinshtein and composed by Samuel Pokrass. Written in 1920, during the Russian Civil War, the song was meant as a combat anthem for the Red Army.

== History ==
The immediate context of the song is the final Crimean offensive in the Russian Civil War by Pyotr Wrangel's troops in July 1920. The second verse refers to the call to a final effort in the Crimea published by the Revolutionary Military Council in Pravda on 10 July.

While the song has a separate refrain, the verses repeat the claim that "The Red Army is the strongest of all", which came to be the song's conventional title. The first verse of the song reads as follows:

Белая армия, чёрный барон
Снова готовят нам царский трон,
Но от тайги до британских морей
Красная Армия всех сильней.

Translation:

The White Army and the Black Baron
Are preparing to restore to us the Tsar's throne,
But from the taiga to the British seas
The Red Army is the strongest of all!

"Black Baron" was a nickname of Wrangel's, from his alleged penchant for wearing (and dressing some of his elite units in) black uniforms. Wrangel's offensive was indeed halted by the Red Army, and Wrangel and his troops were forced to retreat to Crimea in November 1920, pursued by both Red and Nestor Makhno's Revolutionary Insurgent army cavalry and infantry. Wrangel and the remains of his army were evacuated from Crimea to Constantinople on 14 November 1920.

The song's melody is possibly inspired by Eastern European Jewish folk-music, as one passage is also heard in the Yiddish song "Dus Zekele mit Koilen" ('The Little Coal Sack'), whose opening bars possibly also inspire those of the Italian protest song "Bella Ciao".

The song became popular in the early days of the Soviet Union. It was sung in 1923 at the rally in Leningrad against the Curzon Line, the "British seas" acquiring new significance in view of Lord Curzon's ultimatum. In a letter to a school for blind students in the Vologda region, Nadezhda Krupskaya—wife of Vladimir Lenin—named it as one of her favorite songs alongside "The Internationale". The phrase "from the taiga to the British Seas" became something of an idiomatic expression used by other authors, such as by V. A. Lugovsky in his 1926 poem "Pesni o vetre" ('Song About the Wind').

In its early oral transmission from 1920 to 1925, the song underwent some variations. Gorinshtein later recalled that his original lyrics had four or five verses, and that his original refrain was slightly different.

The march was first printed in 1925, and subsequently published under the titles of «От тайги до британских морей» ('For from the Taiga to the British Seas'), «Красная армия» and «Красноармейская» ('Red Army'). It was not until 1937 that the conventional title had settled on «Красная Армия всех сильней» ('The Red Army Is the Strongest to Be!'). Between the 1920s and the 1940s, the song was reproduced without indication of its authors. It was only in the 1950s that musicologist A. Shilov established the authorship of Gorinshtein and Pokrass.

The march was adopted by the Chapaev Battalion of the International Brigades in the Spanish Civil War, and it was allegedly sung in a Nazi torture chamber by Czech communist Julius Fučík. Alternative Russian lyrics were set to the tune during World War II, e.g. «Всем нам свобода и честь дорога» by Pyotr Belyi in 1941.

In Red Vienna, the tune was used for the song „Die Arbeiter von Wien“ ('The Workers of Vienna'), highlighting those fighting for a bright future of the proletariat.

== Lyrics ==
=== Russian original ===
Cyrillic script

I
Белая армия, чёрный барон
Снова готовят нам царский трон,
Но от тайги до британских морей
Красная Армия всех сильней.

Припев:
𝄆 Так пусть же Красная
Сжимает властно
Свой штык мозолистой рукой,
И все должны мы
Неудержимо
Идти в последний смертный бой! 𝄇

II
Красная Армия, марш марш вперёд!
Реввоенсовет нас в бой зовёт.
Ведь от тайги до британских морей
Красная Армия всех сильней!

Припев

III
Мы раздуваем пожар мировой,
Церкви и тюрьмы сравняем с землёй.
Ведь от тайги до британских морей
Красная Армия всех сильней!

Припев

Romanization of Russian

I
Bélaya ármiya, chyórnyy barón
Snóva gotóvyat nam tsárskiy tron,
No ot taygí do británskikh moréy
Krásnaya Ármiya vsekh sil'néy.

Pripév:
𝄆 Tak pust' zhe Krásnaya
Szhimáyet vlástno
Svoy shtyk mozólistoy rukóy,
I vse dolzhný my
Neuderzhímo
Idtí v poslédniy smértnyy boy! 𝄇

II
Krásnaya Ármiya, marsh marsh vperyód!
Revvoyensovyét nas v boj zovyót.
Ved' ot taygí do británskikh moréy
Krásnaya Ármiya vsekh sil'néy.

Pripév

III
My razduváyem pozhár mirovóy,
Tsérkvi i tyúr'my sravnyáem s zemlyóy.
Ved' ot taygí do británskikh moréy
Krásnaya Ármiya vsekh sil'néy.

Pripév

IPA transcription (Note: See Russian phonology and Help:IPA/Russian.)

1
[ˈbʲe.ɫə.jə ˈar.mʲɪ.jə ˈtɕɵr.nɨj bɐ.ˈron |]
[ˈsno.və ɡɐ.ˈto.vʲɪt nam ˈtsar.skʲɪj tron ‖]
[no ɐt‿tɐj.ˈɡʲi də‿brʲɪ.ˈtan.skʲɪx mɐ.ˈrʲej |]
[ˈkras.nə.jə ˈar.mʲɪ.jə fsʲex sʲɪlʲ.ˈnʲej ‖]

[prʲɪ.ˈpʲef]
𝄆 [tak ˈpuzdʑ‿ʐɨ ˈkras.nə.jə |]
[ʐːɨ.ˈma.(j)ɪt ˈvɫas.nə]
[svoj ʂtɨk mɐ.ˈzo.lʲɪs.təj rʊ.ˈkoj |]
[i‿fsʲe dɐɫʐ.ˈnɨ mɨ |]
[nʲɪ.ʊ.dʲɪr.ˈʐɨ.mə |]
[ɪ.ˈtʲi f‿pɐ.ˈslʲedʲ.nʲɪj ˈsmʲert.nɨj boj ‖] 𝄇

2
[ˈkras.nə.jə ˈar.mʲɪ.jə marʂ marʂ fpʲɪ.ˈrʲɵt |]
[rʲɪ.və.(j)ɪn.sɐ.ˈvʲet naz ˈv‿boj zɐ.ˈvʲɵt ‖]
[vʲetʲ ɐt‿tɐj.ˈɡʲi də‿brʲɪ.ˈtan.skʲɪx mɐ.ˈrʲej |]
[ˈkras.nə.jə ˈar.mʲɪ.jə fsʲex sʲɪlʲ.ˈnʲej ‖]

[prʲɪ.ˈpʲef]

3
[mɨ rəz.dʊ.ˈva.(j)ɪm pɐ.ˈʐar mʲɪ.rɐ.ˈvoj |]
[ˈtsɛrk.vʲɪ i ˈtʲʉrʲ.mɨ srɐv.ˈnʲæ.(j)ɪm z‿zʲɪm.ˈlʲɵj ‖]
[vʲetʲ ɐt‿tɐj.ˈɡʲi də‿brʲɪ.ˈtan.skʲɪx mɐ.ˈrʲej |]
[ˈkras.nə.jə ˈar.mʲɪ.jə fsʲex sʲɪlʲ.ˈnʲej ‖]

[prʲɪ.ˈpʲef]

=== Translations ===
English version

I
The White Army and the Black Baron
Are trying to restore the Tsar's throne,
But from the taiga to the British seas
The Red Army is the strongest of all!

Refrain:
Let the Red Army
Masterfully grip
Its bayonet with its toil-hardened hand,
And we must all
Irrepressibly
Go into a last deadly fight!

II
Red Army, march, march forward!
The Revolutionary Military Council calls us into battle.
For from the taiga to the British seas
The Red Army is the strongest of all!

Refrain

III
We are fanning the flames of a world-wide fire,
We will raze churches and prisons to the ground.
For from the taiga to the British seas
The Red Army is the strongest of all!

Refrain

Chinese version
by Xue Fan

一
嘿白匪军是一群黑乌鸦，
想把我们踏在脚底下。
从英国沿海到西伯利亚，
嘿世界上红军最强大！

副歌：
𝄆 红军的战士们，
把刺刀擦亮，
要紧紧握住手中枪！
我们都应当，
越战越顽强，
和敌人决死在疆场！ 𝄇

二
红军战士迈开步向前进，
响应号召我们去斗争。
从英国沿海到西伯利亚，
嘿世界上红军最强大！

副歌

三
让革命的火燃烧在全世界，
把大教堂监狱都毁灭。
从英国沿海到西伯利亚，
嘿世界上红军最强大！

副歌

Esperanto version

I
La blanka armeo, la nigra baron',
Ree por ni pretas la caran tron'
Sed de la tajgo ĝis la britaj mar'
Haltigos neniu la ruĝular'!

Refreno:
𝄆 Kaj tiel ni, ruĝaj,
Estu venkantaj
Kun bajoneto enmane
Kaj ĉiuj ni
Sen oscili
Iru batalen ĝismorte! 𝄇

II
Ruĝa armeo, antaŭen ni ir'!
Neniu el ni timas 'sti martir'!
Ĉar de la tajgo ĝis la britaj mar'
Haltigos neniu la ruĝular'!

Refreno

III
Ni tute detruos la mondon malnov',
Fari ion ajn libere ni pov'
Ĉar de la tajgo ĝis la britaj mar'
Haltigos neniu la ruĝular'!

Refreno

== Other variations ==
The tune was also used for communist songs in other languages, including in German in the Weimar Republic by German communists in the 1920s. An early German version with the incipit „Weißes Gesindel und adlige Brut“ ('White Riffraff and Noble Scum') was a free translation of the original lyrics:

Weißes Gesindel und adlige Brut
baun am zaristischen Throne gar gut.
Doch von Sibirien zum Baltischen Meer;
die Rote Armee ist das stärkere Heer.

Translation:

White riff-raff and noble scum
are busily rebuildin' the tsarist throne.
but from Siberia to the Baltic Sea;
the Red Army is the strongest to be.

„Die Arbeiter von Wien“ was written by Fritz Brügel in 1927, following the July Revolt. It became popular through its use by Austrian socialists and by members of the Republikanischer Schutzbund, who fought the Dollfuss regime in the short-lived Austrian Civil War in February 1934. The first verse of Brügel's version reads:

Wir sind das Bauvolk der kommenden Welt,
Wir sind der Sämann, die Saat und das Feld.
Wir sind die Schnitter der kommenden Mahd,
Wir sind die Zukunft und wir sind die Tat.

Translation:

We are the builders of the coming world,
We are the sower, the seed and the field,
We are the reapers of the coming mowing,
We are the future and we are the deed.

The German version was further adapted into Turkish, as "Avusturya İşçi Marşı" ('Austrian Workers' March'). The first verse of the Turkish version reads:

Hayat denilen kavgaya girdik, çelik adımlarla yürüyoruz
Biz bu karanlık yolun sonunda doğacak güneşi görüyoruz
Dağları aşıyor, bak yakınlaşıyor, Kızılyıldız'a hep koşun
Bu bir rüya değil, bu bir hülya değil, yıldızıdır kurtuluşun

Translation:

We walked into the fight called "life", we walk with steps of steel
We see the sun that'll rise at this dark way's end
It's climbing over mountains, look, it's coming closer, march towards the Red Star, always
This isn't a dream, this isn't a reverie, this is the star of liberation

The song "Borgu", a Corsican patriotic song by the musical group Chjami Aghjalesi, is set to the same melody. It commemorates the Battle of Borgo as well as other Corsican figures and events.

== See also ==
- Alexandrov Ensemble
- List of socialist songs
- State Anthem of the Soviet Union
