= Cistérniga =

Coordinates: 41°37′N 4°41′W

Cistérniga, Spain
- Coat of arms

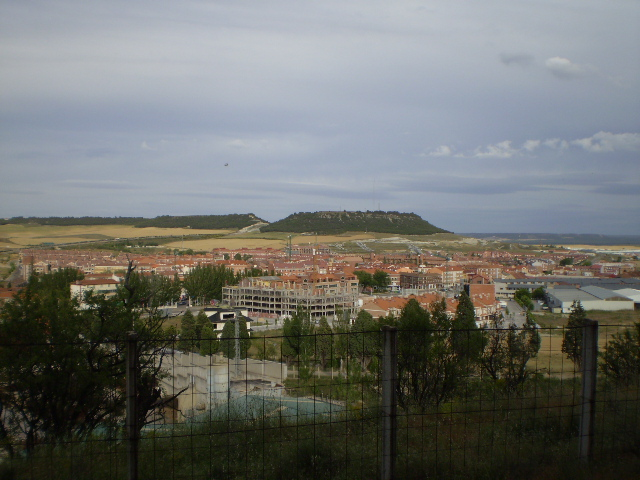
- Panoramic view.
- Country: Spain
- Autonomous community: Castile and León
- Province: Valladolid
- Municipality: Cistérniga

Area
  - Total: 31 km^{2} (12 sq mi)

Population (2025-01-01)
  - Total: 9,489
  - Density: 310/km^{2} (790/sq mi)
- Time zone: UTC+1 (CET)
  - Summer (DST): UTC+2 (CEST)

Cistérniga is a municipality located in the province of Valladolid, Castile and León, Spain. According to the 2018 census (INE), the municipality has a population of 9,049 inhabitants.

Valeriano Orobón Fernández, the author of the lyrics to the anarchist anthem A Las Barricadas, was born in the town.

== See also ==
- Cuisine of the province of Valladolid
