= Hostile Whirlwinds =

1953 film by Mikhail Kalatozov

Hostile Whirlwinds (Вихри враждебные)
- Directed by: Mikhail Kalatozov
- Written by: Nikolai Pogodin
- Starring: Mikhail Kondratyev; Vladimir Yemelyanov
- Cinematography: Mark Magidson
- Music by: Dmitry Kabalevsky
- Production company: Mosfilm
- Release date: 1953
- Running time: 103 minutes
- Country: Soviet Union
- Language: Russian

Hostile Whirlwinds (Russian: Вихри враждебные, romanized: Vikhri vrazhdebnye) is a 1953 Soviet historical film directed by Mikhail Kalatozov based on a screenplay by Nikolai Pogodin.

== Plot summary ==
The film portrays the first years of Soviet government, biography of Felix Dzerzhinsky in 1918–1921.

In 1956, three years after Joseph Stalin's death, the film was re-released without scenes featuring Stalin.

This film explores a complex time between a relationship of two severely stern Soviet lovers who explore a complicated relationship. Some themes that occur during this film are resilience, the need for violence in difficult circumstances, and how physical relationships affect actual issues. This movie is symbolically sensual and takes great interpretation to understand the true meaning of this relationship. This substory occurs in the midst of several tragic events.

== Cast ==
- Mikhail Kondratyev as Vladimir Lenin
- Vladimir Yemelyanov as Felix Dzerzhinsky
- Leonid Lyubashevsky as Yakov Sverdlov
- Vladimir Solovyov as Mikhail Kalinin
- Ivan Lyubeznov
- Alla Larionova
- Viktor Avdyushko
- Georgi Yumatov
- Vladimir Boriskin
- Oleg Zhakov
- Nikolai Gritsenko
- Andrei Popov
- Mikheil Gelovani as Joseph Stalin (scenes later deleted)
- Klara Luchko

== Title origin ==
The film takes its title from a line in the popular Polish revolutionary song Whirlwinds of Danger (Warszawianka, To The Barricades, Hostile Whirlwinds hover above us.../«Вихри враждебные реют над нами...») and the Russian translation of it made by Gleb Krzhizhanovsky.
