= A las Barricadas =

Spanish anarchist song

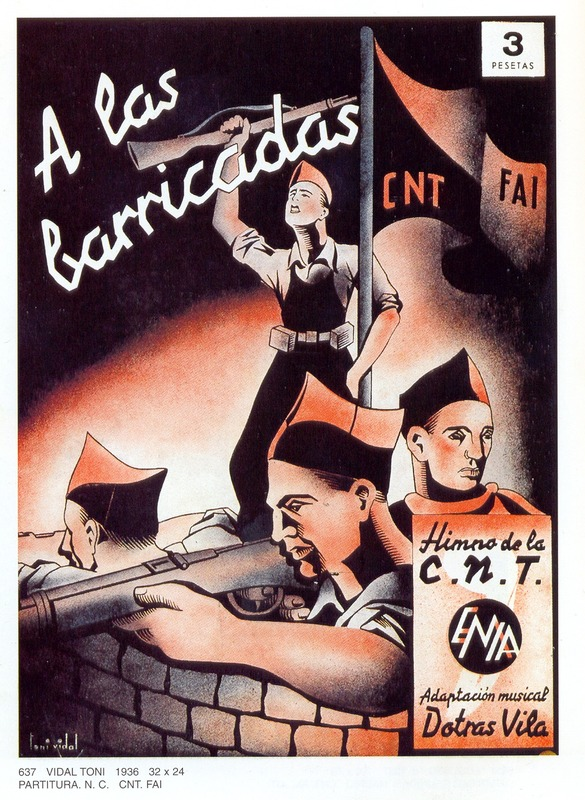
- A las Barricadas

Song
- Language: Spanish
- Written: Original music from "Warszawianka" composed in 1879. Spanish lyrics written in 1933.
- Published: November 1933.
- Recorded: 1936
- Length: 1:13
- Composer: Józef Pławiński
- Lyricist: Valeriano Orobón Fernández (based on original lyrics by Wacław Święcicki)

Audio sample
- file; help

Recording with piano and vocals

Instrumental recording

"A las Barricadas" (English: To the Barricades) is a Spanish anarchist anthem, popularised during the Spanish Civil War as the official hymn of the National Confederation of Labour (CNT). The lyrics, written by Valeriano Orobón Fernández, were based on the Polish revolutionary anthem "Whirlwinds of Danger", composed by Józef Pławiński. Since the civil war, it has gained widespread popularity among the songs of the international left and remains in use among contemporary anarchists.

== Composition ==
The lyrics to the song were composed in the early 1930s by the Spanish anarchist writer Valeriano Orobón Fernández. The Spanish lyrics were based on a German translation of the Polish revolutionary anthem "Whirlwinds of Danger" (Polish: Warszawianka), the lyrics of which were originally penned in the early 1880s by Wacław Święcicki and the music composed by Józef Pławiński.

== Popularisation ==
By 1936, the song had become the official anthem of the National Confederation of Labour (CNT), an anarcho-syndicalist trade union confederation. It became one of the main anarchist anthems of the Spanish Civil War, together with the song "Hijos del Pueblo", and it would often be featured in the propaganda films of the CNT. The song was sung by the Durruti Column when it departed from Barcelona for the Aragon front. Composer Pablo Sorozábal reported that when his orchestra played "A las Barricadas", the anarchists and syndicalists would stand up and perform the anarchist salute, locking their hands together over their heads, while the socialists and communists remained seated. He likewise reported the opposite happening when his orchestra performed "The Internationale".

In the latter half of the 20th century, "A Las Barricades" entered the global repertoire of left-wing music, taking a place alongside other Spanish Civil War songs like "¡Ay Carmela!", the Italian partisan song "Bella ciao" and the Russian anti-fascist song "Katyusha", among others. The song was adopted by members of the French Confédération nationale du travail (CNT-F), headquartered on Rue des Vignoles in Paris. It has also been covered by anarcho-punk bands, which have played renditions of it with loud electric guitars and screaming.

== Lyrics ==
Spanish

Negras tormentas agitan los aires
nubes oscuras nos impiden ver.
Aunque nos espere el dolor y la muerte
contra el enemigo nos llama el deber.

El bien más preciado es la libertad
hay que defenderla con fe y con valor.

Alza la bandera revolucionaria
que del triunfo sin cesar nos lleva en pos.
Alza la bandera revolucionaria
que del triunfo sin cesar nos lleva en pos.

En pie el pueblo obrero, a la batalla
hay que derrocar a la reacción.

¡A las barricadas! ¡A las barricadas!
por el triunfo de la Confederación.
¡A las barricadas! ¡A las barricadas!
por el triunfo de la Confederación.

Catalan

Negres tempestes agiten els aires
núvols sinistres enceguen l'esguard.
Encara que ens esperi la mort més cruenta
contra l'adversari havem de lluitar.

L'única riquesa és la llibertat
i cal defensar-la amb coratge i fe.

Alta la bandera revolucionària
que sens repòs ens mena al triomf del nostre anhel.
Alta la bandera revolucionària
que sens repòs ens mena al triomf del nostre anhel.

Dempeus tot el poble, tots a la lluita
esfondrem amb fúria la reacció!

A les barricades! A les barricades!
Per la victòria de la Confederació.
A les barricades! A les barricades!
Per la victòria de la Confederació.

English translation

Black storms shake the air
Dark clouds blind us
Although pain and death [may] await us
Duty calls us against the enemy

The most precious good is freedom
It must be defended with faith and courage

Raise the revolutionary flag
Which carries us ceaselessly towards triumph
Raise the revolutionary flag
Which carries us ceaselessly towards triumph

Get up, working people, to the battle
[We] have to topple the reaction

To the Barricades! To the Barricades!
For the triumph of the Confederation
To the Barricades! To the Barricades!
For the triumph of the Confederation

== Covering artists ==
- Bandista (with the name "Haydi Barikata")
- Jean-Marc Leclercq
- Pascal Comelade
- Victor Manuel and Ana Belén (as a duet piece).
- Los Muertos de Cristo
- Feminazgûl

== See also ==
- Bella Ciao – Italian anti-fascist folk song
- Buruh Tani – Indonesian protest song
- Die Arbeiter von Wien – Viennese worker's song
- Kabar Ma Kyay Buu – Burmese protests song
- Songs of the Spanish Civil War

== Bibliography ==
- Alonso, Diego (2021). "Transnational Networks of Communist Musical Propaganda in the Spanish Civil War". Journal of War & Culture Studies. 14 (4): 454–478. doi:10.1080/17526272.2021.1950963.
- Hofman, Ana (2020). ""We are the Partisans of Our Time": Antifascism and Post-Yugoslav Singing Memory Activism". Popular Music and Society. 44 (2): 157–174. doi:10.1080/03007766.2020.1820782.
- Iglesias, Iván (2024). "(Re)Sounding Nations: Anthems and the Politics of Performing and Listening in Wartime Europe (1936–1945).". In Moreno-Luzón, Javier; Nagore-Ferrer, María (eds.). Music, Words, and Nationalism: National Anthems and Songs in the Modern Era. Palgrave Macmillan. pp. 137–157. doi:10.1007/978-3-031-41644-6_7.
- Paz, Abel (2006) [1996]. Durruti in the Spanish Revolution. Translated by Morse, Chuck. Edinburgh: AK Press. ISBN 1-904859-50-X. LCCN 2006920974. OCLC 482919277.
- Rothaus, Tomas (2025). "33 Rue des Vignoles: Paris, 1997". Another War Is Possible: Militant Anarchist Experiences in the Antiglobalization Era. PM Press. pp. 25–48. ISBN 9798887441153.
