= Else Feldmann =

Austrian writer (1884–1942)

Feldmann circa 1934

Else Feldmann (25 February 1884 – 1942) was an Austrian writer, playwright, poet, socialist journalist, and victim of the Holocaust.

She grew up in Leopoldstadt as the daughter of poor Jewish parents with her six siblings. She wrote a strongly autobiograhical book titled "Dandelion. A childhood", which describes her childhood in 1920s Vienna, her relationships with her siblings and parents, and her initial encounters with art and literature. "Dandelion" portrays working-class people at that time, and illustrates how difficult it is to improve one's lot when one is poor. She attended college, but after her father lost his job she was forced to leave school to work in a factory. In 1908, she became a contributor to the socialist newspaper Arbeiter-Zeitung and went on to co-found a socialist writers group, Vereinigung sozialistischer Schriftsteller, with Jewish socialist poet Josef Luitpold Stern, communist author, poet, essayist, and songwriter Fritz Brügel, Jewish anarchist and socialist lyricist and poet Theodor Kramer, and early science fiction author Rudolf Brunngraber.

Feldmann was able to develop stories from her articles into novels to reach a wider audience with her socialist message. She began working full-time for the Arbeiter-Zeitung in 1923 until the newspaper, along with other socialist and communist political activity, was forbidden by the austrofascist Fatherland Front Party in 1934. On 14 June 1942 Feldman was captured by the Gestapo and sent to Sobibór extermination camp, where she was murdered.

== Books ==
- Lowenzahn: Eine Kindheit
- Liebe ohne Hoffnung
- Der Leib der Mutter
- Martha und Antonia
