= Tachanka (song) =

Soviet revolutionary song

Song
- Language: Russian
- Published: 1937
- Genre: Revolutionary song
- Songwriter: Mikhail Ruderman
- Composer: Konstantin Listov

"Tachanka" (/təˈtʃæŋkə/; Russian: Tачанка [tɐˈtɕankə]), also known as the "Song of the Tachanka" (Песня о Тачанке), is a Russian-language Soviet revolutionary song from the late interwar period, composed by Konstantin Listov and written by Mikhail Ruderman in 1937.

When Listov read the poem written by Ruderman, it reminded him of a personal military incident, where he observed a White Army encircling a Red Army battalion and a Red soldier pushing towards the battalion on a tachanka; the soldier successfully reached his allies but was mortally injured. The text describes the unnamed battle in the Russian Civil War and the tachankas that were used by the Red Army at the time.

"Tachanka" was first performed on 18 December 1937 in Moscow Conservatory, and was adapted into a short-film released by film studio Lendoc.

It underwent several lyrical changes over the years, and features in the repertoire of the Red Army Choir and Leon Lishner.

== Lyrics ==
Russian original

Cyrillic script

I
Ты лети с дороги, птица,
Зверь, с дороги уходи!
Видишь, облако клубится,
Кони мчатся впереди!

II
И с налёта, с поворота,
По цепи врагов густой
Застрочит из пулемёта
Пулемётчик молодой.

Припев:
Эх, тачанка-ростовчанка,
Наша гордость и краса,
Конармейская тачанка, (Note: Replaced in some versions with «Приазовская тачанка» (Priazovskaja tačanka).)
Все четыре колеса!

III
Эх, за Волгой и за Доном
Мчался степью золотой
Загорелый, запылённый
Пулемётчик молодой.

IV
И неслась неудержимо
С гривой рыжего коня
Грива ветра, грива дыма,
Грива бури и огня.

Припев:
Эх, тачанка-киевлянка,
Наша гордость и краса,
Комсомольская тачанка, (Note: Replaced in some versions with «Украинская тачанка» (Ukrainskaja tačanka).)
Все четыре колеса!

V
По земле грохочут танки,
Самолёты петли вьют,
О будённовской тачанке
В небе лётчики поют.

VI
И врагу поныне снится
Дождь свинцовый и густой
Боевая колесница,
Пулемётчик молодой.

Припев:
Эх, тачанка-полтавчанка,
Наша гордость и краса,
Пулемётная тачанка,
Все четыре колеса!

Latin script (Croatian-styled)

I
Ty leti s dorogi, ptica,
Zverj, s dorogi uhodi!
Vidišj, oblako klubitsja,
Koni mčatsja vperedi!

II
I s naljota, s povorota,
Po cepi vragov gustoj
Zastročit iz pulemjota
Pulemjotčik molodoj.

Pripev:
Eh, tačanka-rostovčanka,
Naša gordostj i krasa,
Konarmejskaja tačanka,
Vse četyre kolesa!

III
Eh, za Volgoj i za Donom
Mčalsja stepiu zolotoj
Zagorelyj, zapyljonnyj
Pulemjotčik molodoj.

IV
I neslasj neuderžimo
S grivoj ryžego konja
Griva vetra, griva dyma,
Griva buri i ognja.

Pripev:
Eh, tačanka-kievljanka,
Naša gordostj i krasa,
Komsomolskaja tačanka,
Vse četyre kolesa!

V
Po zemle grohočut tanki,
Samoljoty petli viut,
O budjonnovskoj tačanke
V nebe ljotčiki pojut.

VI
I vragu ponyne snitsja
Dožd svincovyj i gustoj
Bojevaja kolesnica,
Pulemjotčik molodoj.

Pripev:
Eh, tačanka-poltavčanka,
Naša gordostj i krasa,
Pulemjotnaja tačanka,
Vse četyre kolesa!

IPA transcription

1
[tɨ lʲɪˈtʲi‿z‿dɐˈroɡʲɪ | ˈptʲitsə |]
[zvʲerʲ | z‿dɐˈroɡʲɪ ʊxɐˈdʲi ‖]
[ˈvʲidʲɪʂ | ˈobɫəkə kɫʊˈbʲitsːə |]
[ˈkonʲɪ ˈmtɕatsːə f⁽ʲ⁾pʲɪrʲɪˈdʲi ‖]

2
[i‿s‿nɐˈlʲɵtə | s‿pəvɐˈrotə |]
[pɐ‿ˈtsɛpʲɪ vrɐˈɡov‿ɡʊˈstoj]
[zɐˈstrotɕɪt is‿pʊlʲɪˈmʲɵtə]
[pʊlʲɪˈmʲɵtɕːɪk məɫɐˈdoj ‖]

[prʲɪˈpʲef]:
[ɛx | tɐˈtɕankə rəstɐfˈtɕankə |]
[ˈnaʂə ˈgordəsʲtʲ i‿krɐˈsa |]
[kənɐrˈmʲejskəjə tɐˈtɕankə |]
[fsʲe tɕɪˈtɨrʲɪ kəlʲɪˈsa ‖]

3
[ɛx | zɐ‿ˈvoɫgəj i zɐ‿ˈdonəm]
[ˈmtɕaɫs⁽ʲ⁾ə ˈsʲtʲep⁽ʲ⁾jʊ zəlɐˈtoj]
[zəɡɐˈrʲeɫɨj | zəpɨˈlʲɵnɨj]
[pʊlʲɪˈmʲɵtɕːɪk məɫɐˈdoj ‖]

4
[i nʲɪˈsɫasʲ nʲɪʊdʲɪrˈʐɨmə]
[z‿ˈɡrʲivəj ˈrɨʐɨvə kɐˈnʲa]
[ˈɡrʲivə ˈvʲetrə | ˈɡrʲivə ˈdɨmə |]
[ˈɡrʲivə ˈburʲɪ i‿ɐɡnʲa ‖]

[prʲɪˈpʲef]:
[ɛx | tɐˈtɕankə kʲɪ(j)ɪˈvlʲankə |]
[ˈnaʂə ˈgordəsʲtʲ i‿krɐˈsa |]
[kəmsɐˈmolʲskəjə tɐˈtɕankə |]
[fsʲe tɕɪˈtɨrʲɪ kəlʲɪˈsa ‖]

5
[pə‿zʲɪˈmlʲe ɡrɐˈxotɕʊt ˈtankʲɪ |]
[səmɐˈlʲɵtɨ pʲɪtˈlʲi v⁽ʲ⁾jut |
[ə‿bʊˈdʲɵnːəfskəj tɐˈtɕankʲɪ]
[v‿ˈnʲebʲe ˈlʲɵtɕːɪkʲɪ pɐˈjut ‖]

6'
[i‿vrɐˈgu pɐˈnɨnʲe ˈsʲnʲitsːə]
[doʂtʲ svʲɪnˈtsovɨj i gʊˈstoj]
[bə(j)ɪˈvajə kəlʲɪsʲˈnʲitsə |]
[pʊlʲɪˈmʲɵtɕːɪk məɫɐˈdoj ‖]

[prʲɪˈpʲef]:
[ɛx | tɐˈtɕankə pəɫtɐfˈtɕankə |]
[ˈnaʂə ˈgordəsʲtʲ i‿krɐˈsa |]
[pʊlʲɪˈmʲɵtnəjə tɐˈtɕankə |]
[fsʲe tɕɪˈtɨrʲɪ kəlʲɪˈsa ‖]

English translation

I
Bird, fly from the road, and quickly!
Better hurry or you're dead!
See that dust cloud coming thickly,
Horses charging far ahead!

II
Blasting, turning, fire pouring,
into crowds of enemies!
His machine gun rattling, roaring,
our young gunner clears the fields!

Chorus:
Hey Tachanka gun from Rostov,
You're our joy and you're our pride!
Red cavalry gun-carts blast off,
Four wheels whirring as they ride!

III
We crossed the Don after the Volga,
Through the golden steppe so free!
Tanned, and dusty our young gunner,
Blasted through our enemy!

IV
As, unstoppable and mighty,
Like the manes of our wild steeds,
Manes of wind, smoke, storm, and fire,
Slice our land like wind through reeds!

Chorus:
Hey Tachanka gun from Kiev,
You're our joy and you're our pride!
The Red youth army's gun-carts racing,
Four wheels whirring as they ride!

V
Up above our soaring pilots,
Seek the enemy on high.
Looking down they see Tachanka
And salute you from the sky.

VI
In the fields our tanks are rumbling,
See the foe is on the run.
Forward then Tachanka,
With each bullet from your gun.

Chorus:
Hey Tachanka gun from Poltava!
You're our joy and you're our pride!
Red cavalry gun-carts, fire!
Four wheels whirring as they ride!

== See also ==
- List of socialist songs
