= Warszawianka (1905) =

Polish folk / Polish revolutionary song

Song
- Language: Polish, Russian
- English title: Whirlwinds of Danger; March Song of the Workers; The Song of Warsaw; Hostile Whirlwinds; The Varsovian
- Written: between 1879 and 1883
- Published: 15 September 1883
- Genre: Revolutionary song
- Songwriters: Wacław Święcicki; Douglas Robson (1st English version); Randall Swingler (2nd English version)
- Composer: Józef Pławiński

Audio with English lyrics and piano accompaniment

Warszawianka 1905 in Polish, sung by Jan Stern, 1909

Whirlwinds of Danger (original Polish title: Warszawianka) is a Polish socialist revolutionary song written some time between 1879 and 1883. The Polish title, a deliberate reference to the earlier song by the same title, could be translated as either The Varsovian, The Song of Warsaw (as in the Leon Lishner version) or "the lady of Warsaw". To distinguish between the two, it is often called "Warszawianka 1905 roku" ("Warszawianka of 1905"), after the song became the anthem of worker protests during the Revolution in the Kingdom of Poland (1905–1907), when 30 workers were shot during the May Day demonstrations in Warsaw in 1905. The main meaning of the word Warszawianka is the Polish word meaning “Varsovian woman/lady/girl, the female inhabitant of Warsaw and/or a woman original to Warsaw. “Warszawianka” is the Polish noun in the nominative singular form. A secondary meaning is the "Song of Warsaw".

According to one version, Wacław Święcicki wrote the song in 1879 while serving a sentence in the Tenth Pavilion of the Warsaw Citadel for socialist activity. Another popular version has it written in 1883, immediately upon Święcicki's return from exile in Siberia. By the beginning of the next decade the song became one of the most popular revolutionary anthems in Russian-held Poland. The music was written by composer Józef Pławiński, who was imprisoned together with Święcicki, inspired partially by the January Uprising song "Marsz Żuawów".

== Lyrics and variants ==
Its Russian version with altered lyrics, which removed any mention of Warsaw from the song, the "Varshavianka" (Варшавянка), once experienced considerable popularity. Gleb Krzhizhanovsky is usually reported as the author of the Russian version and the moment of writing the text is thought to be 1897, when Krzhizhanovsky was imprisoned.

In East Germany, a German translation was created and used as a common piece of marching music by the Army; whilst France's 1st Parachute Hussar Regiment adopted the same music using different lyrics.

In 1924, Isadora Duncan composed a dance routine called Varshavianka to the tune of the song.

An English version of the lyrics, originally titled "March Song of the Workers", but known more widely as "Whirlwinds of Danger", was written by Douglas Robson, a member of the Industrial Workers of the World in the 1920s. A London recording of this version by "Rufus John" Goss, made ca. 1925, is available online. It was notably sung by Paul Robeson (only the first stanza) and Leon Lishner (full version, but with modified lyrics). A different version, which kept Robson's first stanza, but with the second and third completely rewritten by Randall Swingler, was published in 1938. However, this version never achieved major popularity.

In the early 1930s, Valeriano Orobón Fernández adapted "Warszawianka" into Spanish as "A las Barricadas", which became one of the most popular songs of the Spanish anarchists during the Spanish Civil War.

In the early 2010s, Zin Linn, a Burmese student activist, wrote a Burmese version of the song based on the Spanish version.

The Prague Revolutionary Choir switches between Polish and Spanish when performing the song, a practice examined alongside collective rehearsal in a study of adult education within a social movement.

== In films ==
- An instrumental rendition of the song is featured in the 1925 film Battleship Potemkin during scenes depicting the citizens of Odesa taking part in the Russian Revolution of 1905.
- The first words of the Russian version served as a name for 1953 film Hostile Whirlwinds.
- In Doctor Zhivago, an instrumental version of the song is played by the peaceful demonstrators in Moscow.
- The song, in version performed by The Red Army Choir, featured in the opening credits of The Jackal (credited as "Warsovienne"), as well as in the submarine scene of Hail, Caesar! (credited as "Varchavianka").
- The song, with altered lyrics, is used in the second episode of the 2018 Polish Netflix Series 1983
- In The Youth of Maxim, a Red Army Choir version is sung by workers demonstrating in multiple scenes of the film

== See also ==
- Revolution in the Kingdom of Poland (1905–1907)
- "Warszawianka 1831 roku"
- "A las barricadas"
- List of socialist songs
