= People's Democratic Party (Indonesia) =

Former political party in Indonesia

People's Democratic Party Partai Rakyat Demokratik
- Abbreviation: PRD
- Chairman: Agus Jabo Priyono
- Secretary-General: Dominggus Tobu Kiik
- Founded: 22 July 1996; 30 years ago
- Dissolved: 1 June 2021; 5 years ago
- Succeeded by: PRIMA
- Headquarters: Jakarta
- Ideology: Pancasila; Democratic socialism Social democracy State socialism Anti-capitalism; Revolutionary nationalism 1996–1998 (New Order): Anti-authoritarianism
- Political position: Centre-left to left-wing Factions: Left-wing to far-left
- DPR seats: 0/462 (1999)

Website
- http://www.prd.or.id

The People's Democratic Party (Indonesian: Partai Rakyat Demokratik, PRD) was a left-wing democratic socialist political party in Indonesia.

== History ==
The party grew from student movements in the late 1980s in Java, Bali and Lombok established to protest against aspects of President Suharto's authoritarian New Order regime. One of these, the Yogyakarta Students Solidarity (SMY) was led by future party leader Budiman Sudjatmiko. The SMY was particularly active and established branches in other cities in Java and beyond. On 23 May 1994, a number of these groups and other activists declared the formation of the People's Democratic Association (also PRD), chaired by Sugeng Bahagijo. A split the following year led to Sugeng's leaving the PRD to establish the Indonesian People's Democratic Movement (PADI). The PRD was temporarily led by a presidium, headed by Budiman. It then joined with a number of students, farmers, artists and workers groups.

From 14–16 April 1996, the PRD held an extraordinary conference, at which it changed its name to the People's Democratic Party. Budimnan was elected chairman and Petrus Hariyanto the secretary general. The party established offices at the Indonesian Legal Aid Institute Foundation in Jakarta on 22 July at a ceremony attended by Megawati Sukarnoputri, who had been recently deposed as leader of the Indonesian Democratic Party (PDI) in a congress supported by the government and the military. In an act of defiance, PRD presented awards to jailed East Timor opposition leader Xanana Gusmão and banned author Pramoedya Ananta Toer.

Meanwhile, protests against the ouster of Megawati as PDI leader continued with a march by 5,000 of her supporters in Jakarta on 20 June. This led to clashes with riot police. Megawati's supporters then occupied the PDI head office in Central Jakarta. On 27 July they were forcibly removed after the building was attacked by security forces and hired thugs. This sparked stone-throwing and large scale clashes between crowds of demonstrators and police and soldiers and ended with the largest riots in Jakarta for 12 years, with buildings and cars being burned. The government and the military blamed the PRD for the disturbances, accusing it of being a communist organization with links to the banned Communist Party of Indonesia (PKI) and Amnesty International. However the report into the incident by the National Commission on Human Rights (Komnas HAM) made no mention of the PRD.

The Indonesian Military made a number of statements to convince the public that PRD leader Budiman was a communist. One spokesman said that Budiman used the word "comrade" to address his associates. Another stated that the party was deliberately declared on 22 July 1996 as that was the same date as Communist Party of Indonesia chairman D.N. Aidit issued the party manifesto on 22 April 1951. A third military spokesman claimed the PRD manifesto used PKI jargon, while the head of the Armed forces, General Faisal Tanjung said the PRD had the same organizational structure as the PKI. The PRD denied all these accusations, declaring on 30 September that "communism is dead". However, after being declared fugitives, Budiman, Peterus and other PRD officials were arrested in August and September. The 60-year-old mother of activist Garda Sembiring was arrested to force her son to give himself up. Budiman was sentenced to 13 years in jail for subversion, but was freed in December 1999 after the fall of Suharto by President Abdurrahman Wahid.

== Political philosophy ==
The party had a democratic socialist platform. It opposes the capitalist system, which it believes exploits workers. It wants to see a 21st-century socialism with control over natural and economic resources passing to the people through a democratic revolution. This way, the state would manage these resources, but control would be in the hands of the people through independent organizations such as trade unions, with workers having a decision-making role in factories. It wants all hospitals to be run by the state, with guaranteed cheap, subsidized healthcare for all. It opposes what it calls the feudalistic exploitation of the regions by the center, and wants an end to the military's business activities. It supports the Universal Declaration of Human Rights and calls for an end to all discriminatory legislation.

== Electoral performance ==
The PRD stood in the 1999 Indonesian legislative election, but won only 0.07% of the vote. It has not stood in subsequent elections.

== Dissolution ==
The PRD, along with several mass organizations, fused into the Just and Prosperous People's Party (Indonesian: Partai Rakyat Adil Makmur, abbreviated as PRIMA) on 1 June 2021, ending the party.

== See also ==
- Buruh Tani - Protest song created by Safi'i Kemamang of the PRD-East Java
