= Just and Prosperous People's Party =

Political party in Indonesia

Just and Prosperous People's Party Partai Rakyat Adil Makmur
- Abbreviation: PRIMA
- Consideration Assembly Chairman: R. Gautama Wiranegara
- General Chairman: Agus Jabo Priyono
- Secretary-General: Dominggus Tobu Kiik
- Founded: 1 June 2021; 5 years ago
- Preceded by: People's Democratic Party
- Headquarters: Jakarta
- Ideology: Pancasila; Secularism; Democratic socialism Civic nationalism Left-wing populism Progressivism; Welfare state Social democracy
- Political position: Centre-left to left-wing
- National affiliation: Advanced Indonesia Coalition
- Slogan: Partainya Rakyat Biasa: Kaum 99 Persen (Party of the Ordinary People: The 99 Percenters)
- Anthem: Mars PRIMA (PRIMA March); Darah Juang (Blood of Struggle)
- DPR seats: 0 / 580
- DPRD I seats: 0 / 2,372
- DPRD II seats: 0 / 17,510

The Just and Prosperous People's Party (Indonesian: Partai Rakyat Adil Makmur, PRIMA) is a centre-left to left-wing political party in Indonesia. The party formed after a merger of the People's Democratic Party (PRD) and numerous mass organizations. PRIMA's formation was announced on 27 May 2020, gained approval from the Ministry of Law and Human Rights on 29 September 2020, and officially founded on 1 June 2021.

The party promoted nine programs known as the 9 Ways of Justice and Prosperous People (Indonesian: 9 Jalan Rakyat Adil dan Makmur): Fair taxation, national industrialization, modern agriculture, strengthening small and medium business enterprises, clean government, progressive advancement of Indonesian peoples, upholding democracy, and gender equality.

Most of the party members and officials during its declaration were PRD cadres and its affiliates. The only exception is R Gautama Wiranegara, a retired major general of Indonesian Army and was a general secretary of National Counter Terrorism Agency.

Due to its connection to the PRD, which was aligned to left-wing politics and had a strong socialist foundation, the party has been attacked and accused as "Neo-Communist" by New-Order revivalists. The accusation was dismissed by party officials.

== History ==
The establishment of Prima was initiated by a number of activists from social movement organizations, labor unions, Islamic activists/figures, small and medium business actors, professionals, women activists, and young people. Some of the founders were exponents of the '98 activists.

PRIMA positions itself as an alternative political party that places the principles of Nationality, Democracy and Community as its political platform.

Partai Prima failed in the verification of Political Parties for the 2024 Election. After its lawsuit against the KPU through Bawaslu & PTUN was rejected, Partai Prima filed a lawsuit through the Central Jakarta District Court. The Prima Party's lawsuit was accepted, one of the decisions of which stated that the implementation of the 2024 Election would be postponed.

== General Chairman ==
Currently, the General Chairman of the People's Prosperous Justice Party is Agus Jabo Priyono since June 1, 2021. The following is a list of General Chairmen of the People's Prosperous Justice Party.

No.	Name	Portrait	Constituency / title	Took office	Left office	Election results
1	Agus Jabo Priyono		Vice Minister of Social Affairs (Note: since 21 October 2024)	1 June 2021	Incumbent	2021 Unopposed 2025 Unopposed

== Organizational Structure ==
The PRIMA ranks at the central level comprise the Central Leadership Council and autonomous bodies known as the Assembly, which includes the Just and Prosperous People's Assembly, the Party Advisory Council (MPP), and the Expert Assembly (MP).

At the provincial level, the PRIMA ranks consist of the Regional Leadership Council (DPW) and autonomous bodies referred to as the Assembly, comprising the Just and Prosperous People's Assembly and the Party Advisory Council.

At the Regency/City level, the PRIMA ranks include the Regency/City Leadership Council (DPK) and an autonomous body called the Just and Prosperous People's Assembly.

Below is the leadership structure of the People's Prosperous Justice Party for the 2020–2025 period.

- Chairman of the Party Advisory Council: R Gautama Wiranegara
- General Chairman: Agus Jabo Priyono
- Deputy General Chairman:
  - Alif Kamal
  - Mangapul Silalahi
  - Ahmad Suluh Rifai
  - Mangapul Silalahi
  - Wahida Baharuddin Upa
  - AJ Susmana
  - Lukman Hakim
  - Siti Rubaidah
- Acting Secretary General: Adi Prianto, SH.
- Deputy Secretary General:
  - Anshar Manrulu
  - Jakpar Ahmad
  - Supriadi Prasetyo
- General Treasurer: Diena Charolin Mondong
- Spokesperson:
  - Farhan Abdillah Dalimunthe
  - Dewi Luna
  - Samsudin Saman
  - Fentia Budiman
  - Mesak Habary
- Chairman of the Party Court: Bin Bin Firman Tresnadi

== 2024 lawsuit ==
The party submitted a case to the Central Jakarta District Court on 8 December 2022 after the party was unable to compete in 2024 Indonesian general election, despite the court not having such power. Among the party's demands are: declaring the party is the party which aggrieved by KPU, ordered General Election Commission to award the party 500 million rupiahs as compensation and the postponement of the election. In an unusual move, the court decided to fulfill all the demands of the party and ordered the General Election Commission to do so on 2 March 2023. The court also ordered the General Election Commission to restart the election process from the verification again. The General Election Commission submitted the appeal over the irregular decision.

Supreme Court of Indonesia, stated that despite the irregularity of the decision, the judges cannot be wronged and asked to the General Election Commission to submit the appeal.

== Famous people ==
- Agus Jabo Priyono
- R Gautama Wiranegara
- Bin Bin Firman Tresnadi
- Alif Kamal
- Rudi Hartono
- AJ Susmana
- Farhan Abdillah Dalimunthe
