= Die Arbeiter von Wien =

Viennese worker's song

"Die Arbeiter von Wien" ("The Workers of Vienna") is an Austrian socialist song, which was most likely written in 1927 when 89 protesters were killed during the July Revolt by police forces which were firing into the outraged crowd. The text of this Arbeiterlied was written by the Viennese poet and essayist Fritz Brügel (1897–1955). The song's melody is derived from the Soviet march "White Army, Black Baron" by Samuel Pokrass.

== History ==
The song was performed for the first time in 1929 at the 2nd International Workers' Youth Day in Vienna. The song became more widespread in 1934 during and after the Civil War between the Austrian labor movement and Social Democratic Party and the fascist authoritarian dictatorship and its organizations. In Vienna, Styria and Upper Austria in particular, workers spontaneously rose up against Austrofascism without any central leadership. Their struggle was suppressed through violent means. The song "Die Arbeiter von Wien" became part of the international anti-fascist song repertoire.

== Lyrics ==
Wir sind das Bauvolk der kommenden Welt,
Wir sind der Sämann, die Saat und das Feld.
Wir sind die Schnitter der kommenden Mahd,
Wir sind die Zukunft und wir sind die Tat.

Refrain

||: So flieg’, du flammende, du rote Fahne,
Voran dem Wege, den wir zieh‘n.
Wir sind der Zukunft getreue Kämpfer.
Wir sind die Arbeiter von Wien. :||

Herrn der Fabriken, ihr Herren der Welt,
Endlich wird eure Herrschaft gefällt.
Wir, die Armee, die die Zukunft erschafft,
Sprengen der Fesseln engende Haft.

Refrain

Wie auch die Lüge uns schmähend umkreist,
Alles besiegend erhebt sich der Geist.
Kerker und Eisen zerbricht seine Macht,
Wenn wir uns ordnen zur letzten Schlacht.

Refrain
