= ¡Ay Carmela! (song) =

- Flag of the International Brigades

Song
- Language: Spanish
- English title: "Ay Carmela!"
- Genre: Topical song
- Songwriter: Unknown
- "Los Cuatro Generales" and "Viva La Quince Brigada" Two folk songs from the Spanish Civil War sung by Leon Lishner. Viva la XV Brigada (Ay Carmela) comes second.

Emblem of the International Brigades, Spanish Civil War

"¡Ay Carmela!" is one of the most famous songs of the Spanish Republican troops during the Spanish Civil War.

It had originally been a nineteenth century folk song, El Paso del Ebro, commemorating the routing of Napoleonic troops across the river Ebro in 1807, during the War of Independence.

During the Spanish Civil War, in common with many older folk songs, the melody was reused with new lyrics by the Republican side, in various versions (El Ejército del Ebro, El paso del Ebro, ¡Ay, Carmela!, ¡Ay, Manuela!, Rumba la Rumba, and Viva la XV Brigada). A lesser known version was also coined by Nationalists (El Río del Nervión).

== Variants ==
The most popular lyrics to this Republican song have two variants known as El Paso del Ebro and Viva la XV Brigada. The first one is related to the Battle of the Ebro and the second mentions the Battle of Jarama, two of the main confrontations of the Civil War.

The sentence Luchamos contra los moros (We fight against the Moors) refers to the Regulares, the feared Moroccan units fighting as the shock troops of the Nationalists.

A Croatian singer and songwriter Darko Rundek released a version of the song with anti-fascist and anti-oppressor lyrics in his 2000 album U širokom svijetu. The song enjoyed widespread support among populations in the Serbian capital of Belgrade, especially during the 2018–2020 Serbian protests.

== Lyrics ==
=== El Ejército del Ebro ===
El Ejército del Ebro,
rumba la rumba la rumba la.
El Ejército del Ebro,
rumba la rumba la rumba la

Una noche el río pasó,
¡Ay Carmela! ¡Ay Carmela!
Una noche el río pasó,
¡Ay Carmela! ¡Ay Carmela!

Y a las tropas invasoras,
rumba la rumba la rumba la.
Y a las tropas invasoras,
rumba la rumba la rumba la

Buena paliza les dio,
¡Ay Carmela! ¡Ay Carmela!
Buena paliza les dio,
¡Ay Carmela! ¡Ay Carmela!

El furor de los traidores,
rumba la rumba la rumba la.
El furor de los traidores,
rumba la rumba la rumba la

Lo descarga su aviación,
¡Ay Carmela! ¡Ay Carmela!
Lo descarga su aviación,
¡Ay Carmela! ¡Ay Carmela!

Pero nada pueden bombas,
rumba la rumba la rumba la.
Pero nada pueden bombas,
rumba la rumba la rumba la

Donde sobra corazón,
¡Ay Carmela! ¡Ay Carmela!
Donde sobra corazón,
¡Ay Carmela! ¡Ay Carmela!

Contraataques muy rabiosos,
rumba la rumba la rumba la.
Contraataques muy rabiosos,
rumba la rumba la rumba la

Deberemos resistir,
¡Ay Carmela! ¡Ay Carmela!
Deberemos resistir,
¡Ay Carmela! ¡Ay Carmela!

Pero igual que combatimos,
rumba la rumba la rumba la.
Pero igual que combatimos,
rumba la rumba la rumba la

Prometemos resistir,
¡Ay Carmela! ¡Ay Carmela!
Prometemos resistir,
¡Ay Carmela! ¡Ay Carmela!

=== Translation ===
The Army of the Ebro,
Rumba la rumba la rumba la!
The Army of the Ebro,
Rumba la rumba la rumba la!

One night the river crossed,
Ay Carmela, ay Carmela!
One night the river crossed,
Ay Carmela, ay Carmela!

And to the invading troops,
Rumba la rumba la rumba la!
And to the invading troops,
Rumba la rumba la rumba la!

It gave them a good beating,
Ay Carmela, ay Carmela!
It gave them a good beating,
Ay Carmela, ay Carmela!

The furor [(fury)] of the traitors,
Rumba la rumba la rumba la!
The furor [(fury)] of the traitors,
Rumba la rumba la rumba la!

[Is in what] Their airplanes drop!
Ay Carmela, ay Carmela!
[Is in what] Their airplanes drop!
Ay Carmela, ay Carmela!

But bombs can do nothing,
Rumba la rumba la rumba la!
But bombs can do nothing,
Rumba la rumba la rumba la!

Where there is too much heart!
Ay Carmela, ay Carmela!
Where there is too much heart!
Ay Carmela, ay Carmela!

Very rabid counterattacks,
Rumba la rumba la rumba la!
Very rabid counterattacks,
Rumba la rumba la rumba la!

We must resist!
Ay Carmela, ay Carmela!
We must resist!
Ay Carmela, ay Carmela!

But in the same way as we fight,
Rumba la rumba la rumba la!
But in the same way as we fight,
Rumba la rumba la rumba la!

We promise to resist!
Ay Carmela, ay Carmela!
We promise to resist!
Ay Carmela, ay Carmela!

=== Viva la Quince Brigada ===
Viva la Quince Brigada,
Rúmbala, rúmbala, rúm-ba-la,
Viva la Quince Brigada,
Rúmbala, rúmbala, rúm-ba-la.

Que se ha cubierta de gloria,
Ay Mañuela, ay Mañuela!
Que se ha cubierta de gloria,
Ay Mañuela, ay Mañuela!

Luchamos contra los Moros,
Rúmbala, rúmbala, rúm-ba-la,
Luchamos contra los Moros,
Rúmbala, rúmbala, rúm-ba-la.

Mercenarios y fascistas,
Ay Mañuela, ay Mañuela!
Mercenarios y fascistas,
Ay Mañuela, ay Mañuela!

Solo es nuestro deseo,
Rúmbala, rúmbala, rúm-ba-la,
Solo es nuestro deseo,
Rúmbala, rúmbala, rúm-ba-la.

Acabar con el fascismo,
Ay Mañuela, ay Mañuela!
Acabar con el fascismo,
Ay Mañuela, ay Mañuela!

En los frentes de Jarama,
Rúmbala, rúmbala, rúm-ba-la,
En los frentes de Jarama,
Rúmbala, rúmbala, rum-ba-la.

No tenemos ni aviones,
Ni tanques, ni cañones, ay Mañuela!
No tenemos ni aviones,
Ni tanques, ni cañones, ay Mañuela!

Ya salimos de España,
Rúmbala, rúmbala, rúm-ba-la,
Ya salimos de España,
Rúmbala, rúmbala, rüm-ba-la.

Para Luchar en otros frentes,
Ay Mañuela, ay Mañuela!
Para Luchar en otros frentes,
Ay Mañuela, ay Mañuela!

=== Literal Translation ===
(Long) Live the Fifteenth Brigade,
Rumba la rumba la rumba la!
(Long) Live the Fifteenth Brigade,
Rumba la rumba la rumba la!

Which will cover us with glory,
Ay Mañuela, ay Mañuela!
Which will cover us with glory,
Ay Mañuela, ay Mañuela!

We fight against the Moors,
Rumba la rumba la rumba la;
We fight against the Moors,
Rumba la rumba la rumba la,

Mercenaries and fascists,
Ay Mañuela, ay Mañuela!
Mercenaries and fascists,
Ay Mañuela, ay Mañuela!

It is only our wish,
Rumba la rumba la rumba la!
It is only our wish,
Rumba la rumba la rumba la!

To finish with fascism!
Ay Mañuela, ay Mañuela!
To finish with fascism!
Ay Mañuela, ay Mañuela!

On the fronts of Jarama,
Rumba la rumba la rumba la!
On the fronts of Jarama,
Rumba la rumba la rumba la!

We have neither airplanes, nor tanks, nor cannons,
Ay Mañuela, ay Mañuela!
We have neither airplanes, nor tanks, nor cannons,
Ay Mañuela, ay Mañuela!

We're now leaving Spain,
Rumba la rumba la rumba la!
We're now leaving Spain,
Rumba la rumba la rumba la!

To fight on other fronts,
Ay Mañuela, ay Mañuela!
To fight on other fronts,
Ay Mañuela, ay Mañuela!

== See also ==
- Si me quieres escribir, another Republican song mentioning the crossing of the Ebro River
- Songs of the Spanish Civil War
- List of socialist songs
