= Valeriano Orobón Fernández =

Spanish anarcho-syndicalist theorist (1901–1936)

Valeriano Orobón
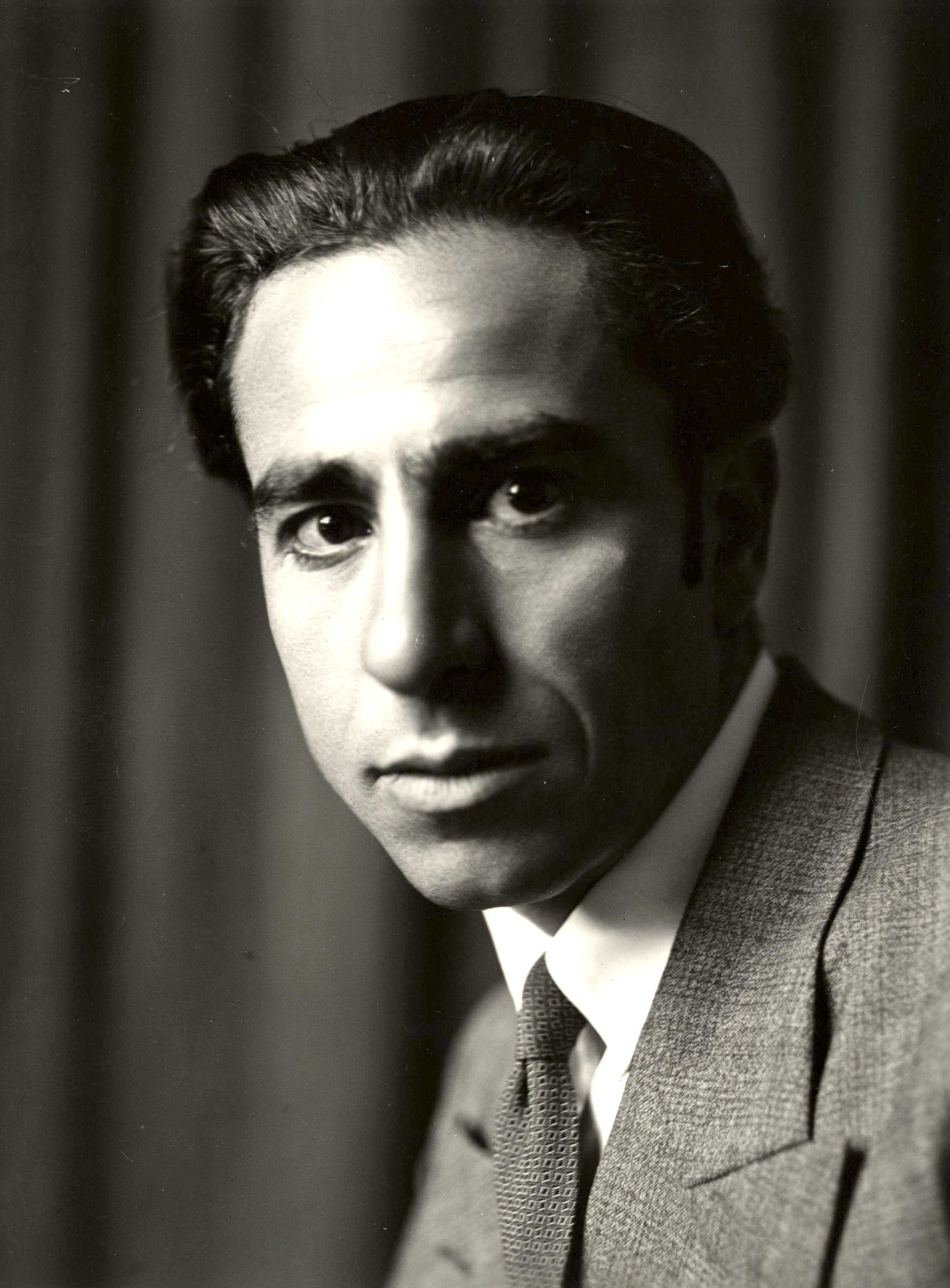
- Orobón, c. 1933
- Born: Valeriano Orobón Fernández; 14 June 1901; Cistérniga, Valladolid, Spain
- Died: 28 June 1936 (aged 35); Madrid, Spain
- Occupations: Journalist, teacher, translator
- Years active: 1917–1934
- Organization: National Confederation of Labour
- Known for: Composing lyrics to A Las Barricadas
- Movement: Anarcho-syndicalism

Valeriano Orobón Fernández (1901–1936) was a Spanish anarcho-syndicalist political theorist, journalist and poet. He developed a theory for the structure of a post-capitalist society based on workers' cooperatives, attempted to mediate between the anarchists and syndicalists of the National Confederation of Labour (CNT), and called for the CNT to form a united front with socialists against fascism. Before his death, he composed the lyrics to the anarchist war song A Las Barricadas, which became the official anthem of the CNT during the Spanish Civil War.

== Biography ==
=== Early life and theories ===
Valeriano Orobón Fernández was born in the Castilian city of Cistérniga, on 14 June 1901. The son of a railway worker, he was educated at a secular school and went on to work as a clerk in Valladolid. In 1917, he joined the National Confederation of Labour (CNT), an anarchist trade union centre. Following the establishment of the dictatorship of Primo de Rivera, he fled to France, where he edited the anarchist newspaper Tiempos Nuevos.

In the mid-1920s, Orobón became concerned with providing anarchism with a "theoretical renewal". He soon became one of the leading theorists of the CNT. He developed a theory on the structure of a post-capitalist society. He proposed that existing trade unions could form the embryo for a post-revolutionary workers' cooperative, which would be small-scale in small towns and villages and would be industry-wide in large cities. These cooperatives would establish workers' control over the means of production. These cooperatives would be linked together first on an industrial basis, in order to improve administration of the economy, and secondly on a more general basis, grouping together cooperatives of different industries into a larger confederation. Once this confederation expanded nationwide, it would then take over representing the national interest in international relations.

=== Exile and return ===
In July 1925, he was expelled from France over his appeals for antimilitarism. He went to Germany, where he met his partner Hilde and became friends with the German anarchists Max Nettlau, Rudolf Rocker and Augustin Souchy. He worked as a translator and taught the Spanish language at the Berlitz Academy. He also joined the secretariat of the International Workers' Association (AIT) and wrote about European news for the Spanish anarchist newspaper La Revista Blanca. Following the fall of the dictatorship, he finally returned to Spain and settled in Madrid, where he came to believe that the CNT was the only European trade union centre capable of carrying out a social revolution. He succeeded in making the CNT the predominant trade union in the Spanish capital and went to work in the cinema industry, translating posters for foreign films.

In July 1930, he told AIT representative Eusebi Carbó that there had been a return to constitutional liberalism in Spain, although he believed it would be insufficient to satisfy the general population. On 14 April 1931, when the Second Spanish Republic was proclaimed to a popular euphoria in the country, Orobón described the atmosphere in terms of the entire population winning the lottery. He hoped that this euphoria would give way to the development of class consciousness by the Spanish working class. Orobón called for a national conference of the CNT, to organise its defence against the influence of political parties and to reorganise its trade union structure to be more flexible and linked together in industrial federations. The following year, he reported that the Civil Guard had asserted the maintenance of class stratification in the new republic and that the left-wing political parties had failed to bring about a social revolution.

=== Splits and united fronts ===
When the CNT experienced a split between its treintista and faista factions, Orobón attempted to defend a "middle way" between the two tendencies. Hoping to avoid both the opportunism associated with syndicalism and the political particularism associated with anarchism, he sought to establish a synthesis of anarcho-syndicalism. At a general meeting of the CNT in August 1932, Andalusian and Aragonese delegates nominated Orobón as editor-in-chief of the organisation's newspaper, but a majority of delegates voted for the faista Avelino González Mallada instead. He complained to Carbó that the organisation was coming under the control of "extremist minorities". As he was increasingly isolated from both factions, in May 1933, he predicted the coming of a civil war between revolutionaries and reactionaries. Around this time, he wrote the lyrics for the anarchist war song A Las Barricadas, which was sung to the tune of the Polish revolutionary song Whirlwinds of Danger.

Following the victory of the right-wing in the 1933 Spanish general election and the failure of the subsequent anarchist insurrection, Orobón was the first anarchist to call for the CNT to form a united front with the socialist-aligned General Workers' Union (UGT), hoping they could overcome their differences and oppose the rise of fascism in the country. He hoped that even a partial victory for the working class could lead to the eventual overthrow of capitalism. Orobón spent the early months of 1934 preparing a proposal for such an alliance. He held that such an alliance would not involve electoralism or the defence of the state, but would instead be based on a shared commitment to workers' democracy. He also precluded any alliance with the requirement that the UGT abandon possibilism and remove bureaucrats from its leadership.

At a plenary meeting of the CNT in February 1934, Castilian trade unions under Orobón's leadership motioned for a discussion on the proposed alliance, with the Valladolid section arguing that failure to collaborate with the UGT would be "suicidal". The proposal received most of its support from the Asturian and Galician delegates, which insisted on the creation of a united front on the condition that it precluded collaboration with "bourgeois sectors". But it was rejected by the Andalusians, who held that working class unity could only be established in the streets during a revolution, rather than by top-down political edicts. The Catalans refused to even discuss the proposal, as it was supported in Catalonia by left-wing organisations which they considered to be the enemies of the CNT.

=== Death and legacy ===
Orbbón's break from anarchist orthodoxy was largely unpopular within the CNT, with Horacio Prieto holding him partially responsible for the outbreak and suppression of the Revolution of 1934 and even accusing him of "Marxism". Nevertheless, his proposal was notably supported by the faista Jacinto Toryho. When the Asturian and Madrid branches of the CNT and UGT formed a pact in March 1934, the Spanish government ordered Orobón be imprisoned. His health rapidly declined in prison and, soon after his release, he died on 28 June 1936. His death was announced in Solidaridad Obrera on 30 June 1936. That same year, his proposals for a united front for revolutionary action were finally taken up at the Zaragoza Congress of the CNT.

His proposal for a working class alliance contributed to the defeat of the Spanish coup of July 1936, which was beaten by workers' militias that went on to carry out a social revolution. During the subsequent Spanish Civil War, his song A Las Barricadas became the official anthem of the CNT. In Cuenca, a column of the confederal militias was named after him. It was later militarised into the 61st Mixed Brigade and integrated into the 42nd Division of the Spanish Republican Army. In late 1936, when the CNT held discussions about the possibility of anarchists collaborating in the government of Francisco Largo Caballero, Orobón's invocation of a united front was revisited, with some activists calling for the exclusion of the Communist Party of Spain (PCE) as a "bourgeois force".

== Selected works ==
- Tormenta sobre España (Berlin, 1931)
- La CNT y la Revolución (Madrid, 1932)
- La CNT y los comunistas españoles (1937)
- Anarcosindicalismo y revolución en Europa (2002), edited by J. L. Gutiérrez Molina

== Bibliography ==
- Alexander, Robert J. (1999). The Anarchists in the Spanish Civil War. London: Janus Publishing Company. ISBN 978-1-85756-400-6.
- Alonso, Diego (2021). "Transnational Networks of Communist Musical Propaganda in the Spanish Civil War". Journal of War & Culture Studies. 14 (4): 454–478. doi:10.1080/17526272.2021.1950963.
- Casanova, Julián (2005). Preston, Paul (ed.). Anarchism, the Republic and Civil War in Spain: 1931–1939. Translated by Dowling, Andrew; Pollok, Graham. Routledge. ISBN 0-415-32095-X.
- Cohn, Jesse (2015). Underground Passages: Anarchist Resistance Culture, 1848-2011. AK Press. ISBN 978-1-84935-202-4.
- Evans, Danny (2016). "'Ultra-left' anarchists and anti-fascism in the Second Republic". International Journal of Iberian Studies. 29 (3): 241–256. doi:10.1386/ijis.29.3.241_1. ISSN 1364-971X.
- Gutiérrez Molina, José Luis (2022). "Valeriano Orobón Fernández". Royal Academy of History (in Spanish).
- Herrerín, Ángel (2020). The Road to Anarchy: The CNT under the Spanish Second Republic (1931–1936). Sussex Academic Press. ISBN 9781789760316.
