= Konstantin Listov =

Soviet composer (1900–1983)

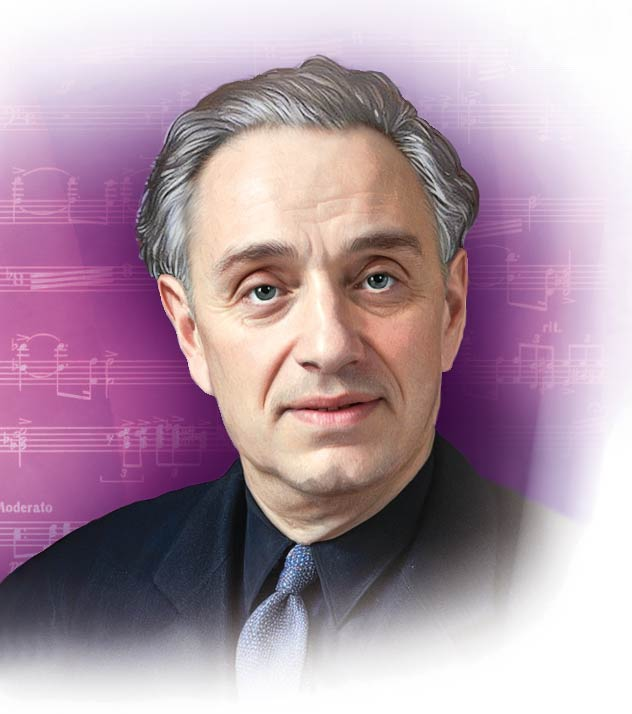
Listov on a 2025 postcard of Russia

Konstantin Yakovlevich Listov (Russian: Константи́н Я́ковлевич Листо́в; 2 October [O.S. 19 September] 1900 – 6 September 1983) was a Soviet composer. He is the composer of many widely popular songs, which include "Pesnya o Tachanke" ("Song of the Tachanka"), "V Zemlyanke" ("In a Zemlyanka"), "Hodili My Pohodami", "Sevastopolsky Vals" ("Sevastopol Waltz"). In 1973 he was bestowed the title of People's Artist of the RSFSR.
