= Józef Pławiński =

Polish composer and socialist activist

Józef Pławiński (born in 1853 or 1854, died on 8 August 1880) was a Polish composer and socialist activist.

He wrote the music to the popular Polish revolutionary song Whirlwinds of Danger (Warszawianka), to the lyrics written by Wacław Święcicki, later used in Spain as the melody of the Spanish Civil War song A las Barricadas.
