= Tachanka =

Horse-drawn machine gun wagon

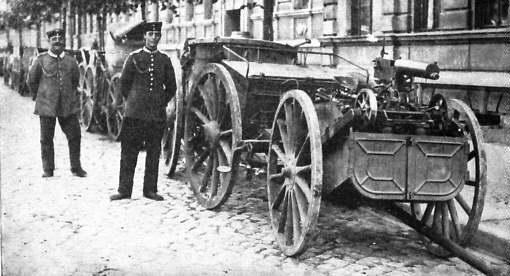
Tachankas turret used in WWI.

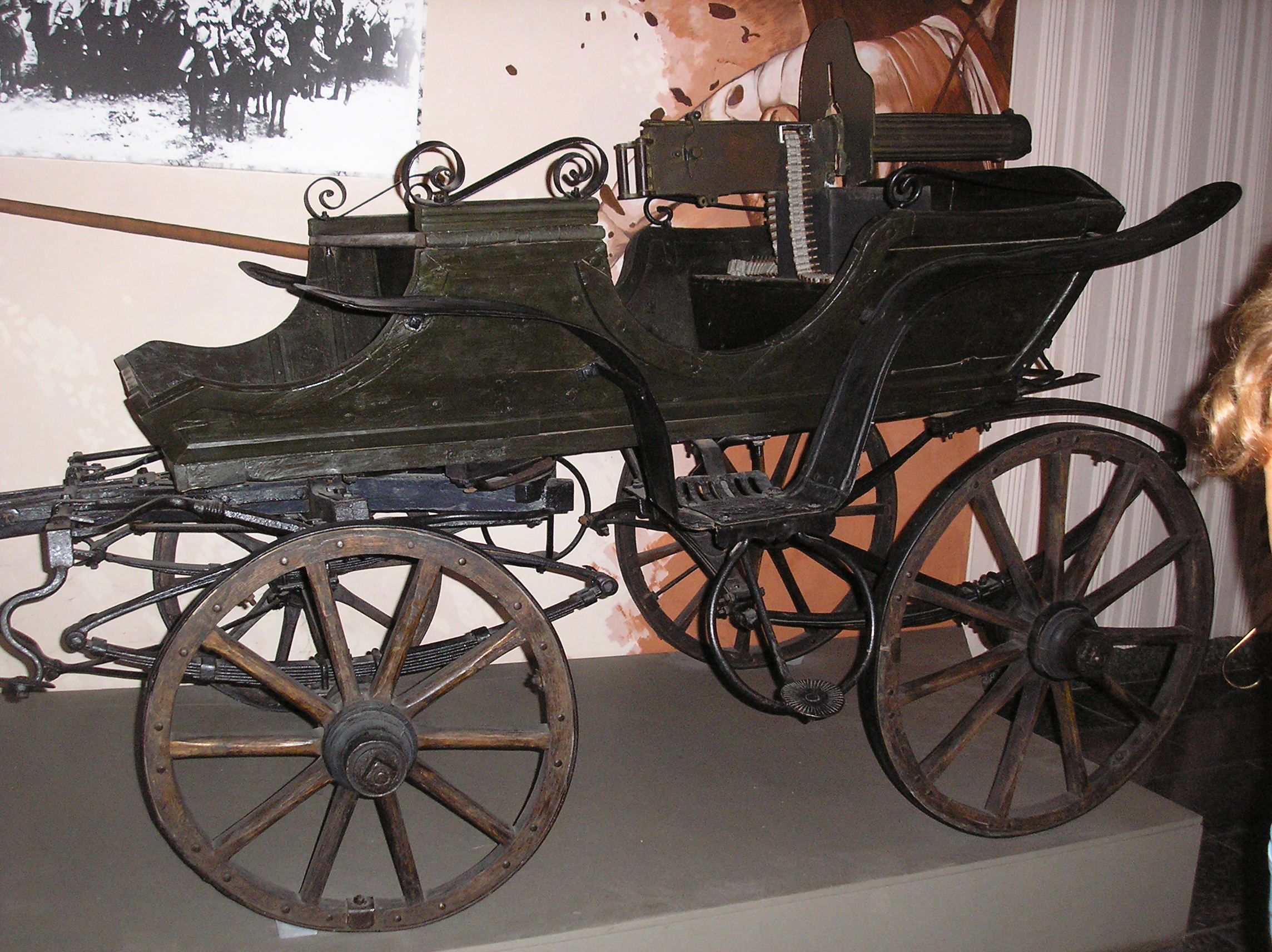
Tachanka armed with a PM M1910 in the Huliaipole museum

A tachanka (Russian and Ukrainian: тачанка) is an open horse-drawn wagon with a heavy machine gun mounted on the rear side. A tachanka requires a crew of two or three (one driver and a machine gun crew) and must be pulled by two to four horses.

== Etymology ==
At least two plausible hypotheses account for the origin of the word tachanka. Vasmer's etymological dictionary suggests that the word derives from Ukrainian netychanka ("нетичанка"), Polish najtyczanka, a type of a carriage named after the town of Neutitschein, present-day Nový Jičín in the Czech Republic. Another account references a Ukrainian diminutive or endearing form of the word tachka (Ukrainian: та́чка, meaning "wheelbarrow'").

== Adoption ==
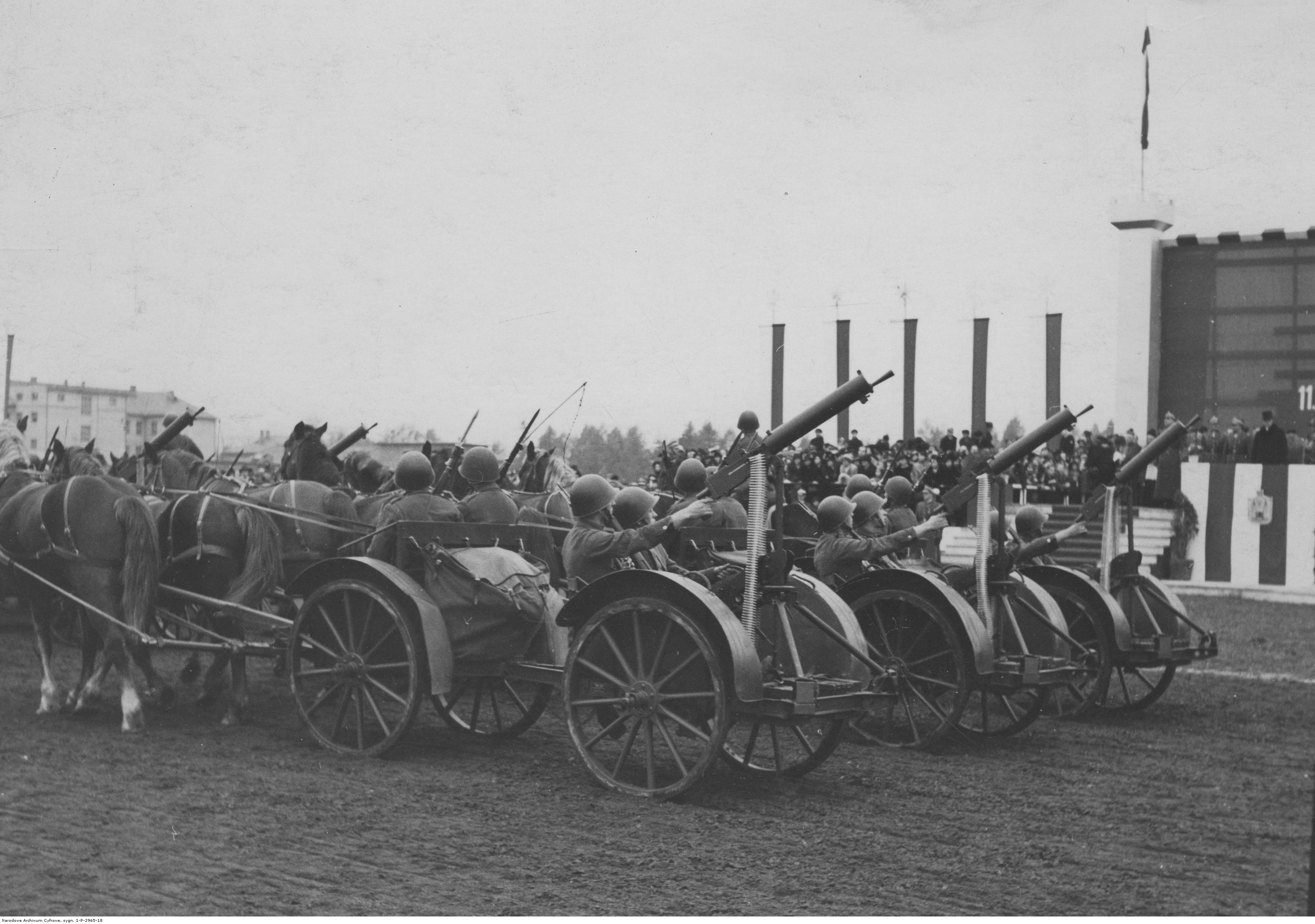
Polish taczanki at an Independence Day parade in 1938

A regular civilian horse wagon could be easily converted to military use and back. The use of tachankas reached its peak during the Russian Civil War (1917–1920s), particularly in the peasant regions of southern Russia and Ukraine, on fronts where fluid mobile warfare gained much significance. With up to four horses abreast pulling a tachanka, it could easily keep up with cavalry units and support them with mobile firepower. A number of sources attribute its invention to Nestor Makhno.

Tachanka tactics were centered around taking advantage of its speed to surprise the enemy. Tachankas, before the introduction of the tank or automobile to the battlefield, were a way to provide high-speed mobility for the heavy, bulky machine guns of World War I. The speed of the horse-drawn wagon would be used to move the machine gun platform to a favorable firing position, and then the enemy would be fired upon before they had a chance to react. Since the machine gun pointed towards the rear of the wagon, the tachankas also provided effective suppressive fire onto pursuing enemy cavalry after raids and during retreats. Ukrainian anarchist leader Nestor Makhno pioneered the use of the tachanka en masse during the Russian Civil War. Makhno's forces relied so heavily upon the use of the tachanka that one Makhnovite referred to himself and his fellow troops as "a republic on tachanki". The Revolutionary Insurrectionary Army of Ukraine used tachankas mainly against enemy cavalry. Makhnovists also used tachankas to transport infantry, thus improving mobility of the army (about 100 km each day). Tachankas soon became used by the Red Army, with the famous example of Vasily Chapayev.

Later, it was adopted by a number of armies, notably the Polish Army which used it during the Polish-Soviet War. Initially mostly improvised, with time the Polish Army also adopted two models of factory-made taczankas, as they were called in Poland. They were used during the Invasion of Poland of 1939 to provide cavalry squadron support. They were attached to every cavalry HMG squadron and HMG company of infantry.

== Armament ==
Despite a certain degree of standardisation, the tachanka's armament was, in most cases, improvised. In Russia, the PM M1910 heavy machine gun was often used. The Polish cavalry of the Polish-Soviet War often used all kinds of machine guns available, including the Maxim, Schwarzlose MG M.07/12, Hotchkiss machine gun and Browning machine gun. The late models of standardised tachankas of the Polish Army were all equipped with Ckm wz.30, a Polish modification of the M1917 Browning machine gun which was also suitable for anti-air fire.

== Cultural references ==
One of the songs glorifying the Red Army during the Russian Civil War was called Tachanka. The concluding lyrics, roughly translated, run:

And to this day, the foe has nightmares
Of the thick rain of lead,
The battle-chariot
And the young machine gunner.

Tachankas can be seen in the classic Soviet films such as Chapayev and The Burning Miles. A modern variant of tachanka can be seen in a cult Russian film Brother 2. In modern Russian slang the word "tachanka" is used for any heavily armed non-standard tactical vehicles.

On 7 November 1987, some tachankas marched within Soviet Army historical segments during the October Revolution Day Parade in Moscow, which commemorated the 70th anniversary of the October Revolution.

In the video game Tom Clancy's Rainbow Six Siege, there is a playable Russian operator by the name of Alexsandr "Tachanka" Senaviev, who operates a DP-27 light machinegun (which was originally on a tripod and had a bulletproof glass shield), and an incendiary grenade launcher.

In North Korea, the Korean People's Army showed Tachankas during the 2023 parades held in Pyongyang, one is commemorated the 75th anniversary of the founding of the Korean People's Army on 8 February, another is commemorated the 70th anniversary of the end of the Korean War on 27 July.

== See also ==
- Caracole
- Carroballista
- Drive-by shooting
- Horse artillery
- Portee
- Technical (vehicle)
- Zamburak
