= Samuel Pokrass =

Russian-born Soviet and American composer (1894–1939)

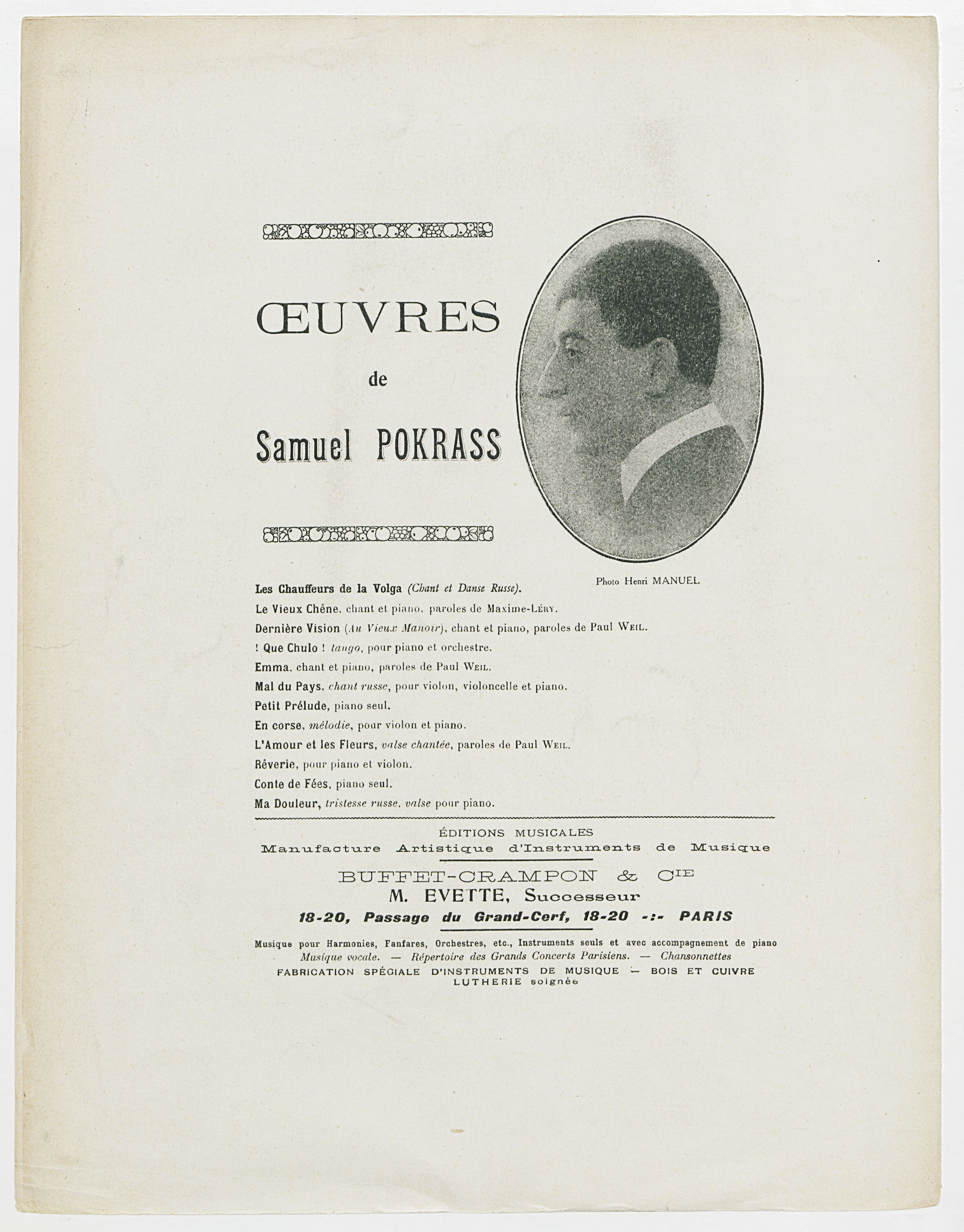
Portrait of Samuel Pokrass on a publication of his works

Samuel Yakovlevich Pokrass (Russian: Самуил Яковлевич Покрасс; 1893 in Kiev, Russian Empire (now Ukraine) – June 15, 1939, in New York City, US) was a Soviet and American composer of Russian-Jewish origin.

== Life and education ==
Pokrass was born in Kiev in 1893. At the age of 10, he was accepted the Kiev college of music, and wrote his first composition, continuing to study music throughout Europe, including with Maurice Ravel in France. Mostly made popular by Natalia Tamara, Pokrass wrote "gypsy songs", and composed music for Micheal Vawditch, Maurice Ravel, the Dolly Sisters, and Maurice Chevalier. Pokrass graduated from the Petrograd Conservatory in 1917 and returned to Kiev, where he became known as a virtuoso accompanist and composer of romance arrangements. While in a club Pokrass was asked to play from Jake Shubert, a visiting American theatrical producer, who was overall not impressed by Pokrass' original music but soon became more focused on him after hearing Pokrass play "All Alone" by Irving Berlin. This led Shubert to giving Pokrass a contract that lead to the creation of "Cyrano de Bergerac". From 1925 - 1927, Pokrass worked as a musician in the court of the Sultan or Morocco, but due to issues had to flee to France.

== Career in Russia and Europe ==
In 1920, during the Russian Civil War, Pokrass collaborated with poet Pavel Gorinshtein to write fighting songs for the Red Army, most notably "The Red Army Is the Strongest". The melody of this song was later used for "Die Arbeiter von Wien" ("The Workers of Vienna") in Red Vienna. Pokrass's music was performed by popular singers in Moscow and was influential in Soviet musical propaganda. Facing political and artistic repression, Pokrass left the Soviet Union in 1924, living in Berlin and Paris before emigrating to the United States.

== Career in the United States ==
Pokrass arrived in the United States in 1924 and initially struggled to find success. He worked as a writer for vaudeville acts before establishing himself as a composer. He became a composer for Twentieth Century-Fox Film Corporation, working in Hollywood from 1934 to 1939. Pokrass arrived in New York to work on a new Broadway musical on June 5, 1939, where he passed 10 days later.

- Notable works include scores for the musical films:
  - Operetta Cyrano De Bergerac (1932)
  - Stage Play: Ziegfeld Follies (1934)
  - The Farmer in the Dell (1936)
  - Tovarich (1937)
  - A Gypsy Told Me (1938)
  - Rebecca of Sunnybrook Farm (1938)
  - The Little Princess (1939)
  - The Three Musketeers (1939)

One of his many songs, "My Best Wishes", was used in the opening of the 2000 film The Legend of Bagger Vance.

== Family and legacy ==
Pokrass had several brothers—Dmitry, Daniil, and Arkady—who were also composers and musicians, and remained in the Soviet Union. As a child, Pokrass' father, Yakov Pokrass, smashed a violin over his head which lead to him studying piano. His works contributed to both Soviet and American musical traditions, particularly in film and popular music. Pokrass died in New York City at age 45. Pokrass's music, especially his Red Army songs, became iconic in Soviet history and were adapted internationally. His contributions to Hollywood musicals and popular songs have been recognized for their lasting impact on American film music.

== Music composed ==
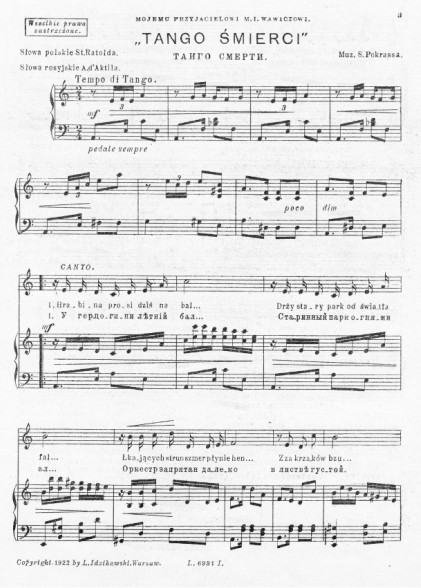
Sheet music for Tango smerti by Samuel Pokrass

- White Army, Black Baron also known as "The Red Army Is the Strongest"
- "Give Me Time"
- "My Best Wishes"
- "The Paper Says Rain"
- "Cyrano De Bergerac"
- "Careful with My Heart"
- "Follies Chorale Ensemble"
- "That’s Where We Come In"
- "To the Beat of My Heart"
- "Tango Smierci"

== Sources ==
- A. V. Shilov, Из истории первых советских песен (1917–24), М., 1963
- A. Sokhor, Как начиналась советская музыка, "МЖ", 1967, No 2.
- Samuel Pokrass - IMDb
