= Buruh Tani =

Indonesian protest song

"Pembebasan"

Song
- Language: Indonesian
- English title: Liberation
- Written: 1996
- Published: 1997
- Genre: Protest song
- Composer: Safi'i Kemamang
- Lyricist: Marjinal

"Buruh Tani" (lit. 'Worker-Farmer') is an Indonesian protest song that originated in the mid-1990s. Despite its common title, the song was originally titled "Pembebasan" (English: 'Liberation'). It was composed in 1996 by Safi'i Kemamang, a young activist from Lamongan, East Java. At the time, Safi'i was involved in the clandestine Partai Rakyat Demokratik (PRD), an underground pro-democracy movement opposing President Suharto’s authoritarian New Order regime.

Safi’i composed Pembebasan to boost the morale of activists engaged in high-risk resistance activities, later explaining that political struggle without music felt incomplete, and that songs and poetry could function as unifying instruments for the movement. The Indonesian Anarcho-punk and activist band Marjinal became aware of the song after the Reformasi period and contributed to its popularization in the 2000s by recording it under the title Buruh Tani. Commonly misattributing the song to the band. The song is popular among Indonesian pro-democracy camps, student activist, labourers, socialists, and anarcho-syndicalists.

== History ==
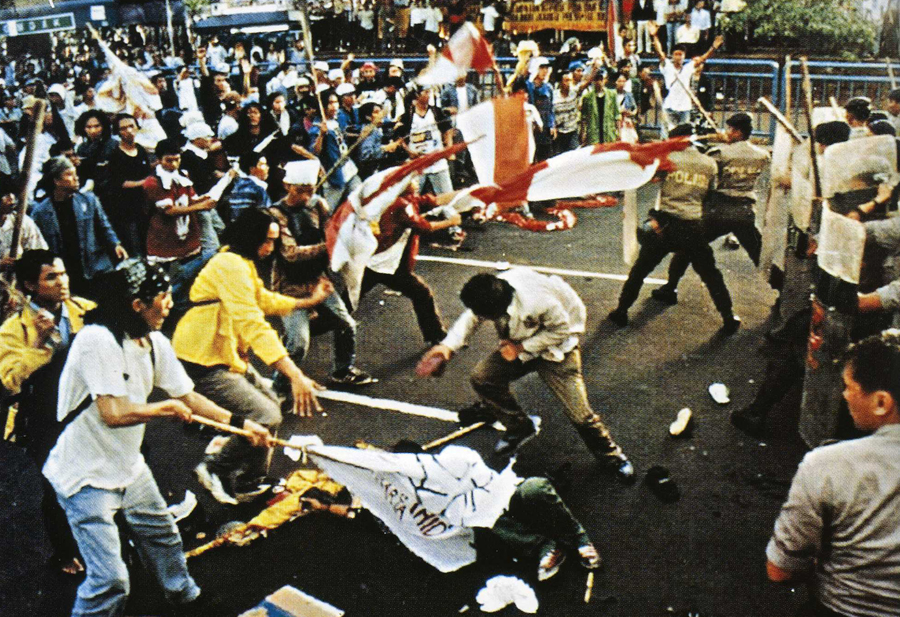
Trisakti University students and police forces clash in May 1998.

In 1996–97, Indonesia’s security forces were cracking down on student activists and labor organizers. “Buruh Tani” was born in the last years of Suharto’s New Order (Orde Baru), when political freedoms were severely restricted.The song was written by Safi’i Kemamang. Born as Arifin in Lamongan, East Java, he came from a poor farming family. His grandfather, grandmother, father, mother, and other family members were farmers. His father's name was Mustofa and his mother's name was Siti Karmiati. He only has one sibling, namely an older sister. Safi‘i developed an interest in political movements and global affairs from an early age. His engagement in activist circles began after he enrolled at a State Vocational School (Indonesian: Sekolah Teknik Menengah; STM) of Tuban, East Java. He claimed that there were practices of misappropriation and corruption carried out by the principal. Then, Safi'i and his friends from STM held a demonstration to protest the corrupt practices, repeatedly three times a year. Safi’i had developed his guitar skills relatively late, beginning during his years at a Technical High School (STM) in Tuban. While serving as the head of the student council in Tuban, he frequently travelled to Blauran Market in Surabaya, in search of second-hand books, including Sukarno's Di Bawah Bendera Revolusi.

Having to have suffered greatly and facing uncertainty as farmers, he alongside his family later migrated to Surabaya, where throughout his life, observed what he considered the four as the main victims of all the policies implemented by the regime; the workers, the farmers, the students, and the urban poor. The frequency of his movement activities as a university student increased when he joined the Indonesian Student Solidarity for Democracy (SMID; Solidaritas Mahasiswa Indonesia untuk Demokrasi) and the People's Democratic Party (PRD). During his work as a factory worker in Surabaya he joined a trade union. Safi’i was a labour field coordinator (korlap) for a labor action scheduled on 8 May 1996 after a collective musyawarah (deliberation). Six days before the protest, on 2 July 1996, he met with workers to discuss and agree on protesting the sharp rise in basic commodity prices. In addition to discussions, strategies were devised to ensure the demonstration proceeded as planned. While returning home from preparations for the factory strike, he was abducted at night and reportedly targeted for killing.

It was reported that the perpetrators of the abduction were members of the Indonesian National Armed Forces (ABRI), specifically the East Java branch of the Coordinating Agency for Assistance in Strengthening National Stability at the Regional Level (Bakorstanasda; Badan Koordinasi Bantuan Pemantapan Stabilitas Nasional Tingkat Daerah). He was quickly taken toward Mojokerto. During the journey, he jumped from the fast-moving car and was dragged along the road, sustaining injuries. He then hid in a sugarcane field and drank water left in cattle hoofprints to survive. Believing that arrest by the military would leave him to a far more dangerous fate, Safi’i instead sought protection at the Surabaya Police Headquarters, where other activists were being held. Following the incident, Safi’i joined the local People's Democratic Party (PRD) sector in Surabaya. For his safety, on 8 July, he was advised to relinquish his role as a labor leader and to operate underground to avoid further threats to his life and continue the struggle.

=== Composition in hiding ===
House in Kedung Tarukan, Tambaksari, Surabaya, used as a safehouse by Safi’i Kemamang, where he strategised protests against the New Order.

Following the trauma of the Kudatuli incident, also known as the 27 July 1996 attacks, the New Order regime blamed the small leftist People's Democratic Party (PRD) for the attacks. Budiman Sudjatmiko and other party leaders, as well as Muchtar Pakpahan, were arrested and tried for subversion. All members of PRD were thus vilified by the regime as communist subversives, going as far as accusing the party of having links to the banned and long defunct Communist Party of Indonesia (PKI) and Amnesty International. Simply being associated with PRD or its "people’s songs" could be life-threatening as many of its cadres and members were hunted down, arrested, tortured, and kidnapped without any news being known. Safi’i Kemamang and his PRD sector in East Java, operating underground amid intense state repression, realized their struggle "needed encouragement" and a sense of unity. From this act, Safi’i thought that the fight against the New Order regime would be long, arduous, and tiring as the New Order system were built upon "militarist-capitalism." Safi’i later recounted that one way to keep the fighting spirit alive was through music as a medium of solidarity. Thus, he penned Pembebasan in Surabaya in 1996, envisioning an anthem to inspire unity among the oppressed classes of workers, peasants, students, and urban poor against the tyranny of the regime. As he believes, from experience, that the workers, peasants, students, and the urban poor were the main victims of New Order policies. Hariyadi (2020) observes that the poor were subjected to extortion through heavy taxation and strict penalties, even when their offenses were relatively minor compared to those committed by corrupt New Orderite officials.

Whilst recovering from his injury from the kidnapping after returning to Lamongan in November 1996, Safi’i wrote several anti–New Order songs; one of which was Pembebasan. He previously owned a guitar that he had purchased during his studies at Universitas Dr. Soetomo (Unitomo), a private university in Surabaya. However, Safi'i stated that dueing the making of the song he relegated to only his mouth and hand percussion as he was unable to get a guitar. The song’s lyrics explicitly call out these groups and urge them to "unite in solidarity to seize back democracy." Gerung et al. (2023) interprets the continuing stanzas as conveying the inevitability of resistance and the eventual success of the reformation movement with the liberation of the working class and envisioning the creation of a new social order under a path toward transformation and improvement over existing conditions. Whilst Hariyadi (2020) interprets a description of a discovered condition of a classless society, implying that equal justice for all citizens would be created under the workers, peasants, students, and the urban poor as its "rulers." The following stanzas of the song invited the people to pursue the goal of a life liberated from various systems or rules perceived as restricting societal existence. Believing such society without the New Order could exist, even if a million action must be taken. Drawing from his background, Safi’i sought to unite these four segments as a united front. Having little access to foreign revolutionary music and knowledge in foreign language, Safi’i had to take reference from Indonesian Revolutionary era songs such like "Halo, Halo Bandung" and "Garuda Pancasila".

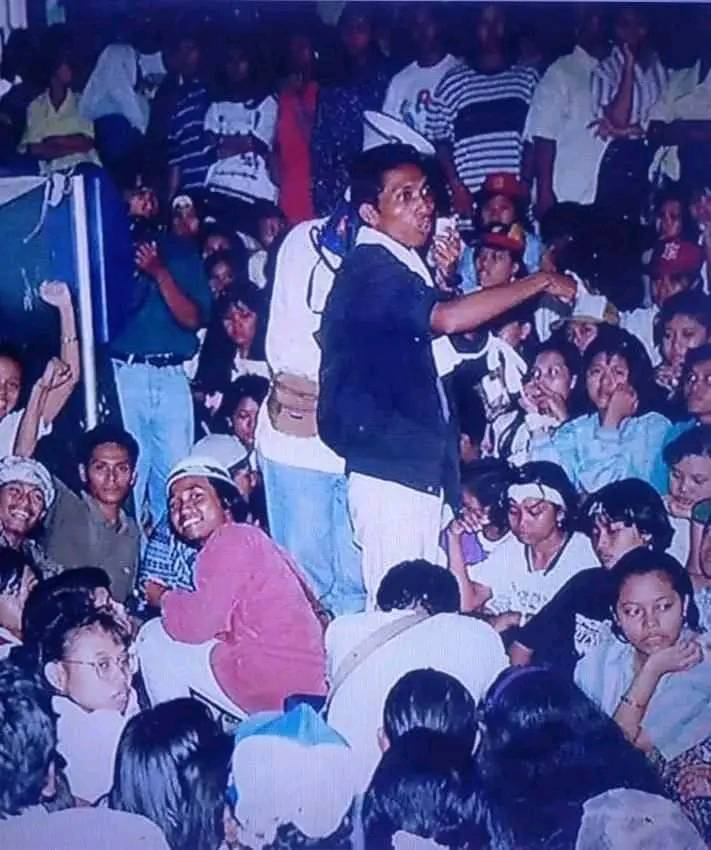
Safi’i Kemamang protesting for the independence of Timor-Leste and the fall of Suharto alongside Indonesian pro-democracy students in 1998.

Safi'i's songs alongside Pembebasan first took hold at the Bratang Terminal in Surabaya in January 1997, where his close ties with buskers facilitated the promotion of his songs. At the terminal, Safi'i borrowed a guitar from one of the buskers, developed a guitar arrangement of the song, and taught the street musicians how to perform it. He had been organising buskers and members of the urban poor in the area since 1995, and encouraged them to perform the song as part of these activities. His compositions were frequently performed on both city and intercity buses within the province, including routes from Bungurasih to Madiun and Ponorogo. Through this network of buskers, the songs gained wider popularity and circulation. After a while, Safi’i Kemamang was compelled to serve as the legal representative during the formation of the National Committee for Democratic Struggle (KNPD) following the Kudatuli Incident and reemerged to the public in 1997, as no one else was willing to take on the role.

As the 1997 Asian Financial Crisis hit, Safi'i would teach other activists of his songs about resistance while continuing to busk to make ends meet. A year after the onset of the economic downturn, mass protests emerged against the New Order regime. Beginning in February 1998 at the University of Indonesia in Salemba with around 750 participants, the demonstrations soon spread to campuses and cities across the country. Buruh Tani would then be at the forefront of the Student movement. According to Safi’i, The song was first adopted by the university students of Dr. Soetomo University (Unitomo) during a 1997 New Order Political Culture Reflection event; by which buskers played the song on New Year's Eve. It was then sung by Unitomo and Universitas 17 Agustus 1945 Surabaya (Untag) students as the protest wave began. Though made for Suharto, the song is still popular today as the song's lyrics are said to be strongly representative towards the real conditions experienced by the masses in Indonesia; current and then.

Until 2025, Safi'i's had lived in Timor Leste, since the country officially became independent from Indonesia in 2002. He commuted between Indonesia and Timor Leste and back. During his time in Timor-Leste, Safi'i worked for the Ministry of Agriculture as an advisor to the minister for seven years. He also stated that his activities continued as he did during his PRD days; organizing and building a mass resistance organization for Timorese students and the urban poor in a guerrilha urbana strategy. He has since published essays and articles under the pseudonym "Vladimir Ageu de Safi'i".

== Versions ==
Buruh Tani
"Buruh Tani" sung by Indonesian Anarcho-Syndicalists during a march in Bandung, 1 May 2019.

Buruh Tani
Rendition with guitar and vocals

Safi’i Kemamang declined to patent the song, allowing others to adapt and reinterpret it freely. He had once contemplated securing a patent but was unable to do so due to the lack of funds. He stated that "only the workers, farmers, students, and urban poor deserve to be the owners." In an interview with Merdika.id, he stated that, "Because I created this song based on the objective and subjective needs of revolution in Indonesia, let this song be a public right." He asked that musicians or groups who derived commercial benefit from the song should donate a portion of the proceeds to support liberation movements representing oppressed peoples.

Over time, the lyrics gradually evolved, although it is unclear when or by whom these changes were made. The version most commonly associated with protest movements was recorded by the Indonesian anarcho-punk and activist band Marjinal in 1997. Meanwhile, rendition most frequently used in demonstrations is an acoustic cover performed by an unidentified male and female student/s. It is likely that the rendition was published from a repository for a University of Indonesia student orientation program from 2012, as it is the earliest found rendition. Though it might as well be older, as metadata suggest it was dated from 2004, concurrent to Amien Rais' presidential debate at the University of Indonesia organised by its students' representative council (BEM UI). Safi’i expressed some concern that the song had deviated from its original meaning; believing that the change in lyrics also mean the change in the spirit and ideals contained within, and thus he rejects the change in lyrics. However, he acknowledged that the changes were a natural response to the shifting conditions and dynamics of Indonesia’s national politics and social movements.

Among university students the song is considered compulsory to memorize. The lyrics are the following;

Lagu Pembebasan

Buruh, tani, mahasiswa, kaum miskin kota
Bersatu padu rebut demokrasi
Gegap gempita dalam satu suara
Demi tugas suci nan mulia

Hari-hari esok adalah milik kita
Terbebasnya massa rakyat pekerja
Terciptanya tatanan masyarakat
Sosialis sepenuhnya

Marilah kawan, mari kita kabarkan
Di tangan kita tergenggam arah bangsa
Marilah kawan, mari kita nyanyikan
Sebuah lagu tentang pembebasan

Marjinal's Buruh Tani

Buruh, tani, mahasiswa, rakyat miskin kota
Bersatu padu rebut demokrasi
Gegap gempita dalam satu suara
Demi tugas suci yang mulia

Hari-hari esok adalah milik kita
Terciptanya masyarakat sejahtra
Terbentuknya tatanan masyarakat
Indonesia baru tanpa ORBA

Marilah kawan, mari kita kabarkan
Di tangan kita tergenggam arah bangsa
Marilah kawan, mari kita nyanyikan
Sebuah lagu tentang pembebasan

Di bawah kuasa tirani
Kususuri garis jalan ini!
Berjuta kali turun aksi
Bagiku satu langkah pasti

English Translation

Workers, farmers, students, the urban poor
Unite together, seize back democracy
Uproaring in one voice
For the sake of a sacred noble cause

Tomorrow is ours
Creating a prosperous society
Shaping a social order
A new Indonesia without ORBA

Come on friend, let us all proclaim
In our hands we grasp the nation’s direction
Come on friend, let us all sing
A song, about liberation

Under the rule of tyranny
I trace this line of the road!
Millions of times, actions taken
For me, it is one step certain

=== Others ===
The song has also been adapted as the main chant used by the BSG Chemie Leipzig ultras, based in Leipzig, Germany. The club’s supporters are generally associated with left-wing and anti-fascist views.
