= Wacław Święcicki =

Polish poet and socialist

Wacław Święcicki (1848–1900) was a Polish poet and socialist. He was the author of the revolutionary song Whirlwinds of Danger (Warszawianka 1905), ((ISWC T-332.708.495-3)) the music to which was written by Józef Pławiński.
