= Fritz Brügel =

Austrian diplomat, journalist and writer

- Born: 13 February 1897; Vienna, Austria-Hungary
- Died: 4 July 1955 (aged 58); London, England
- Citizenship: Austrian; Czechoslovak (from 1935)
- Education: Doctorate in Philosophy, 1921
- Occupations: Journalist, writer, and diplomat
- Notable work: Die Arbeiter von Wien
- Political party: Communist Party of Austria
- Spouse: Vera Brügel (1938–1955)

Fritz Brügel (13 February 1897 – 4 July 1955) was an Austrian-Czechoslovak diplomat, journalist and writer.

== Early life ==
Brügel was born in Vienna, Austria-Hungary, on 13 February 1897. He was the son of the social democratic journalist and historian Ludwig Brügel and Susanna Hönigsfeld from Großmeseritsch (Velké Meziříčí), who would perish in the Theresienstadt Ghetto in 1942, a victim of the Holocaust. Brügel's family moved to Prague, Czechoslovakia, where he would spend most of his childhood. Following the end of his military service, he studied history at the University of Vienna. He graduated with a Doctorate in Philosophy in 1921, with a thesis on the study of Germans in Bohemia.

== Career ==
Brügel soon became the head of the social science study library in the Vienna Chamber of Labor, and he worked as a journalist for several years on social democratic works. From 1923 to 1934, he was also a member of the Socrates Lodge at the Grand Lodge of Vienna. He co-founded the Association of Socialist Writers in 1933, and he participated in the February Uprising of 1934 after joining the Communist Party of Austria.

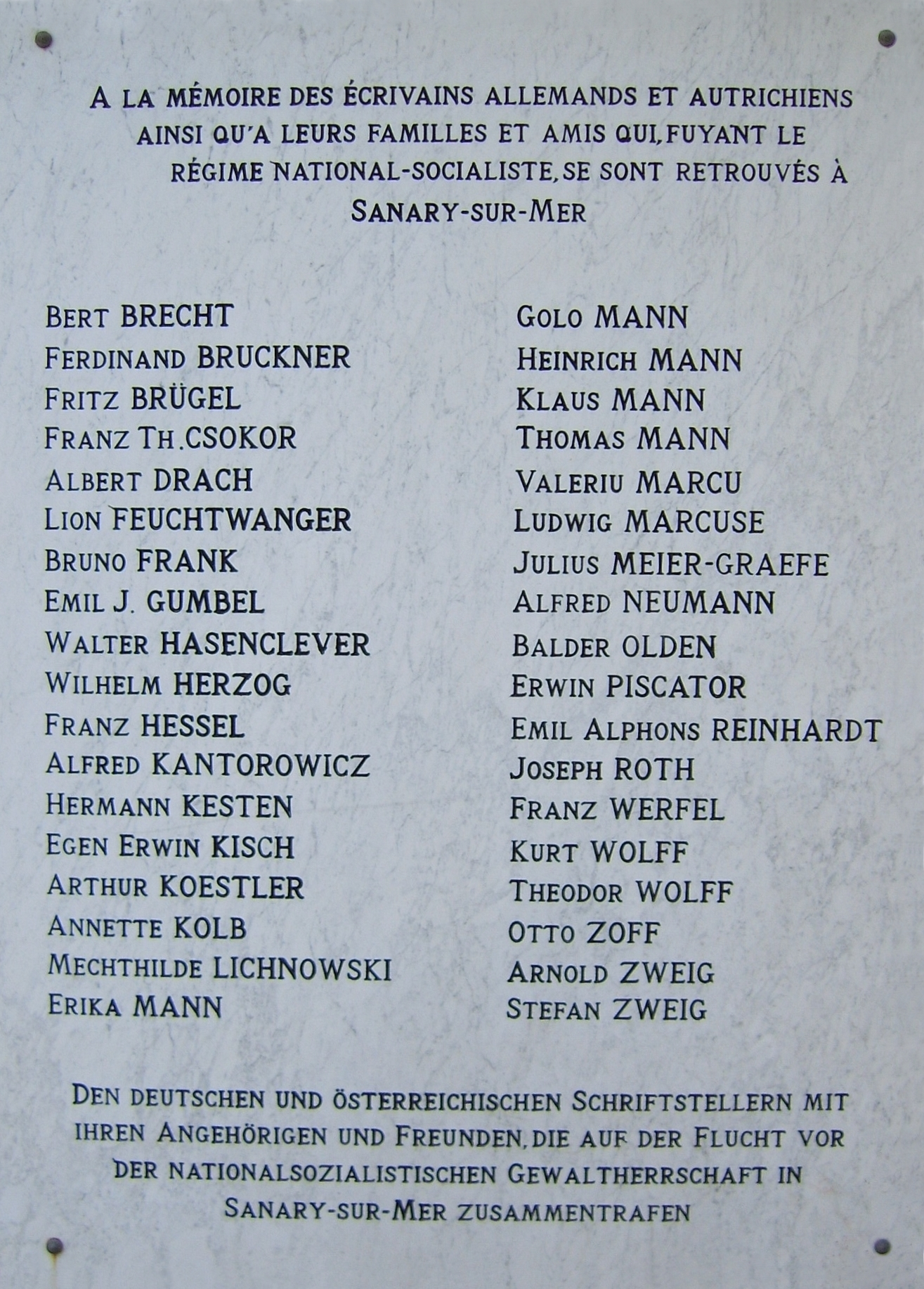
A plaque dedicated to German and Austrian refugees in Sanary-sur-Mur that mentions Brügel (Left side, third from top)

Brügel fled to Czechoslovakia following the failed uprising, and took Czechoslovak citizenship in 1935 after his Austrian citizenship was revoked. He soon got a job as a legation councilor with the Czechoslovak Foreign Ministry, helping contribute to several magazines. Brügel traveled to the Soviet Union in 1936, and moved to France in 1938 after the Munich Agreement was signed in September that year. He first lived in Paris, before eventually moved to southern France. During the German invasion of France, he first fled to Spain, then Portugal, and then the United Kingdom.

Brügel returned to Prague following the end of the Second World War. He was deputy head of the Czechoslovak Military Mission in Berlin starting in 1946, before becoming the chargé d'affaires in 1949. Brügel resigned in 1950 in protest of arbitrary justice in the Czechoslovak Socialist Republic. He moved to London via West Germany and Switzerland, where he would live until his death in 1955. His wife, Vera Brügel, committed suicide the next year.

In addition to his work in journalism, Brügel also wrote narrative works and poems; his best known being the lyrics for the Austrian socialist song "Die Arbeiter von Wien," a song honoring the 1927 July Revolt where 89 people were killed. Brügel also translated some works from Ancient Greek.

== Academic works ==
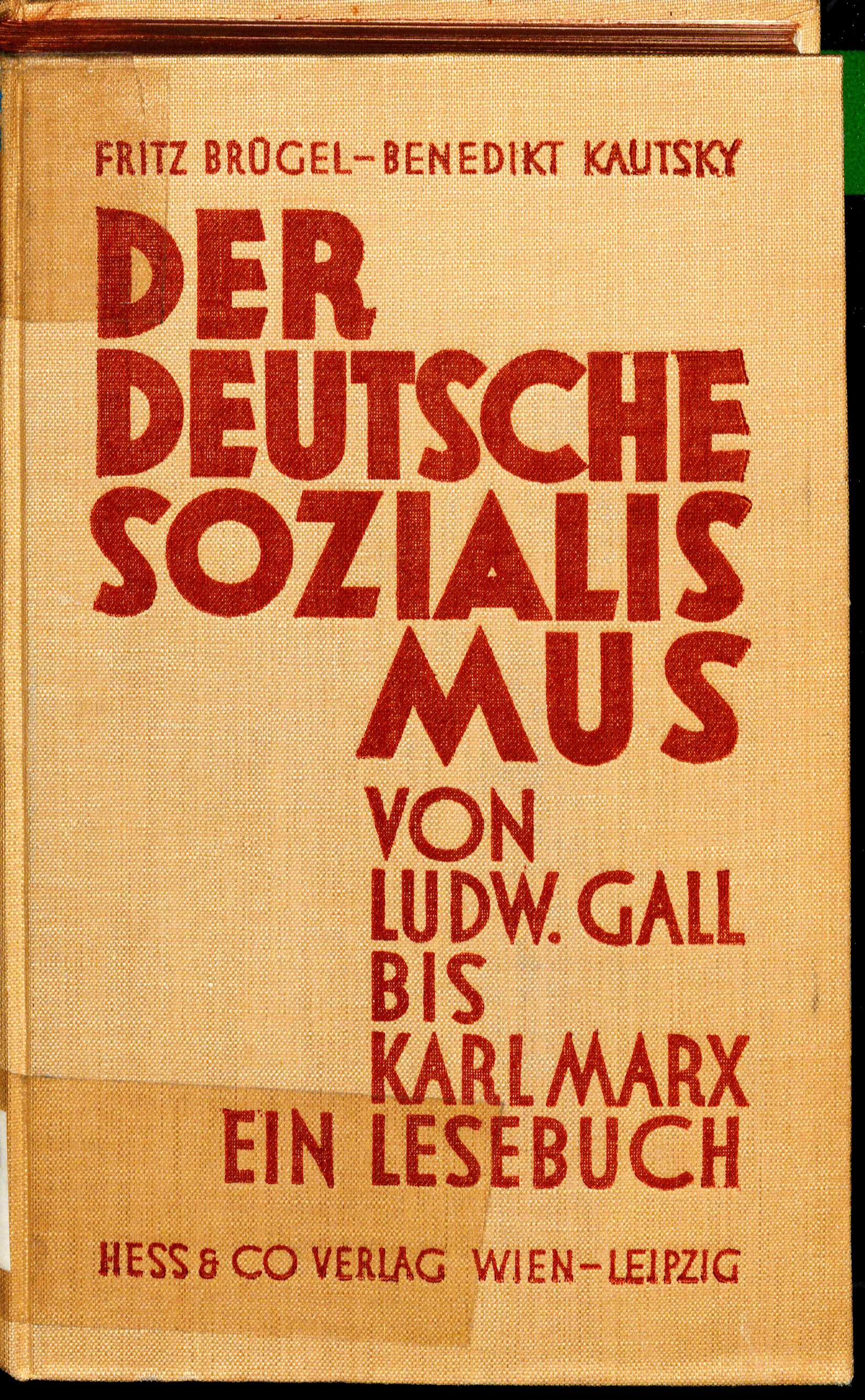
One of Brügel's books, co-authored by Benedikt Kautsky

This is a list of Brügel's academic works. Please do not add others unless they are explicitly academic.

- Contributions to the history of the Germans in Bohemia (Vienna 1921).
- The publishing history of the 'Holy Family'. In: The Fight.
- Social Democracy Monthly ed. by F. Adler, vol. 21, issue 10, pp. 508–510 (Vienna 1928).
- Attribution. E. P. Tal & Co. Verlag (Leipzig/Vienna 1923).
- From the beginnings of the German socialist press (Vienna 1929).
- Leadership and seduction. Reply to Rudolf Borchardt and others (Hess, Vienna 1931).
- Lament for Adonis. Poems (Hess, Vienna / Leipzig 1931).
- The Way of the International Publishing House of the Vienna Organization of the Social Democratic Party (Vienna 1931).
- Goethe in Latin and Greek. In: Philobiblon, vol. 5 (1932).
- The main thing is .... (Hess, Vienna 1932). (Note: Written under the name Wenzel Sladek.)
- February Ballad. Published by "The Fight" (Prague 1935) and "Socialist Magazine 9" (Vienna 1946).
- The publishing history of the "Holy Family" In: The Fight.
- Social Democratic Monthly, Vol. 21 (1938), No. 10, pp. 506–510 (The Holy Family).
- Poems from Europe. The Departure (Zurich 1937), 2nd ed. Oprecht (Zurich/New York 1945).
- The poems of Episthenes. With ill. by Charles Hug, Oprecht (Zurich 1940).
- The chronicler of our time. In: Egon Erwin Kisch on his 60th birthday, Unity Publishing House, (London 1945). Voices from Bohemia, publication series of the Representation of Democratic Germans from Czechoslovakia.
- Conspirators. Europe Publishing House, (Zurich 1951).
