= Trei culori =

Former national anthem of Romania (1977–1990)

English: "Three Colors"
- Emblem of the Socialist Republic of Romania
- Former national anthem of Romania
- Also known as: „Imnul de Stat al Republicii Socialiste România” (English: "State Anthem of the Socialist Republic of Romania")
- Lyrics: Ciprian Porumbescu, 1880
- Music: Ciprian Porumbescu, 1880
- Adopted: 1977
- Relinquished: 1990

Audio sample
- Vocal rendition in G major.: file; help

"Three Colors" (Note: Romanian: „Trei culori”, pronounced [trej kuˈlorʲ]) was the national anthem of the Socialist Republic of Romania from 1977 to 1990. On 24 January 1990, after the Romanian Revolution, it was officially replaced by the current anthem „Deșteaptă-te, române!”. Before 1977, the country's national anthem was „E scris pe tricolor Unire”, whose melody is the same as that of the Albanian national anthem.

The song "Three Colors" is based on a Romanian patriotic song written and composed by Ciprian Porumbescu. The original lyrics twice underwent non-credited revisions in order to reflect the country's Communist doctrine, and parallels between past and present glories. This was unlike one of the previous anthems, „Te slăvim, Românie“, a text mentioning Romania's brotherhood with the Soviet Union, and praises of the Leninist ideology were consciously not included, emphasising a more national communist character of the state.

The title refers to the national flag of Romania, which is a blue-yellow-red tricolor. It has not undergone major changes. Only the distribution of the colors (in point of proportion and position) was changed to a certain extent, being made equal after the abortive Romanian revolution of 1848. The Romanian principalities were among the many European states during that time that were inspired by the French Revolutionary spirit to make a dimensionally standardized tricolour banner as their national flag.

The song continued to be used as Romania's national anthem for around a month after the overthrow of the Socialist Republic, but with Porumbescu's original patriotic lyrics.

== Lyrics ==
=== Original version ===
Romanian lyrics

Trei culori cunosc pe lume
Ce le țin de-un sânt odor,
Sunt culori de-un vechi renume
Suveniri de-un brav popor.

Roșu-i focul ce-mi străbate,
Inima-mi plină de dor
Pentru sânta libertate
Și al patriei amor.

Auriu ca mândrul soare
Fi-va'l nostru viitor
Pururea'n eternă floare
Și cu luci netrecător

Iar albastrul e credința
Pentru nație ce-oi nutrim
Credincioși fără schimbare
Pân' la moarte o să-i fim

Pân' pe cer și cât în lume
Vor fi aste trei culori
Vom avea un falnic nume
Și un falnic viitor

Iar când, fraților, m'oi duce
De la voi ș'oi fi să mor
Pe mormânt, atunci să-mi puneți
Mândrul nostru tricolor

English lyrics

With three colors I'm acquainted
And their holiest embrace
Since old times by glory painted
Recalling a gallant race

Crimson for the fire burning
in my patriotic heart
Liberty, so it decided
Shall be its goals from the start

Like the sun in sky bowers
golden shall our future be
Blooming like a myriad flowers
Shining bright for all to see

We'll be loyal 'till we perish
to Romania, brave and true
To the Homeland which we cherish
this our pledge is marked in blue

As long as our flag is flying
and is gloriously unfurled,
our Romania, land undying,
will be praised and crown the world.

And when shall I leave you, brothers,
And my time will come to die,
This tricolor flag of ours
on my grave shall proudly lie.

=== Official version ===
Romanian lyrics

Trei culori cunosc pe lume,
Amintind de-un brav popor,
Ce-i viteaz, cu vechi renume,
În luptă triumfător.

Multe secole luptară
Străbunii noștri eroi,
Să trăim stăpâni în țară,
Ziditori ai lumii noi.

Roșu, galben și albastru
Este-al nostru tricolor.
Se înalță ca un astru
Gloriosul meu popor.

Suntem un popor în lume
Strâns unit și muncitor,
Liber, cu un nou renume
Și un țel cutezător.

Azi partidul ne unește
Și pe plaiul românesc
Socialismul se clădește,
Prin elan muncitoresc.

Pentru-a patriei onoare,
Vrăjmașii-n luptă-i zdrobim.
Cu alte neamuri sub soare,
Demn, în pace, să trăim.

Iar tu, Românie mândră,
Tot mereu să dăinuiești
Și în comunista eră
Ca o stea să strălucești.

English lyrics (singable)

With three colors I'm acquainted
Which recall a gallant race –
Since old times by glory sainted
Battles has it won apace.

For long ages our forefathers
Have this gallant flag unfurled,
So we may the land's fruit gather,
Building here the future's world.

This tricolor flag of ours
Flutters crimson, yellow, blue,
Like a star in skyey bowers
Rise my people, brave and true.

In this world we are a nation
Keen on work and of one soul.
Free and with new reputation,
Sharing one ambitious goal.

Now united by our Party;
In Romania's meads and fields,
Our work is hard and hearty,
Building Socialism its yield.

For the homeland's greater glory
We crush enemies at fight,
But we'd share a peaceful story
With all peoples in proud light.

Proud Romania, now dearer,
Live forever in fine light!
In the Communist new era
Like a star you must shine bright!
