= Vladimir Socor =

Romanian-American political analyst (1945–2025)

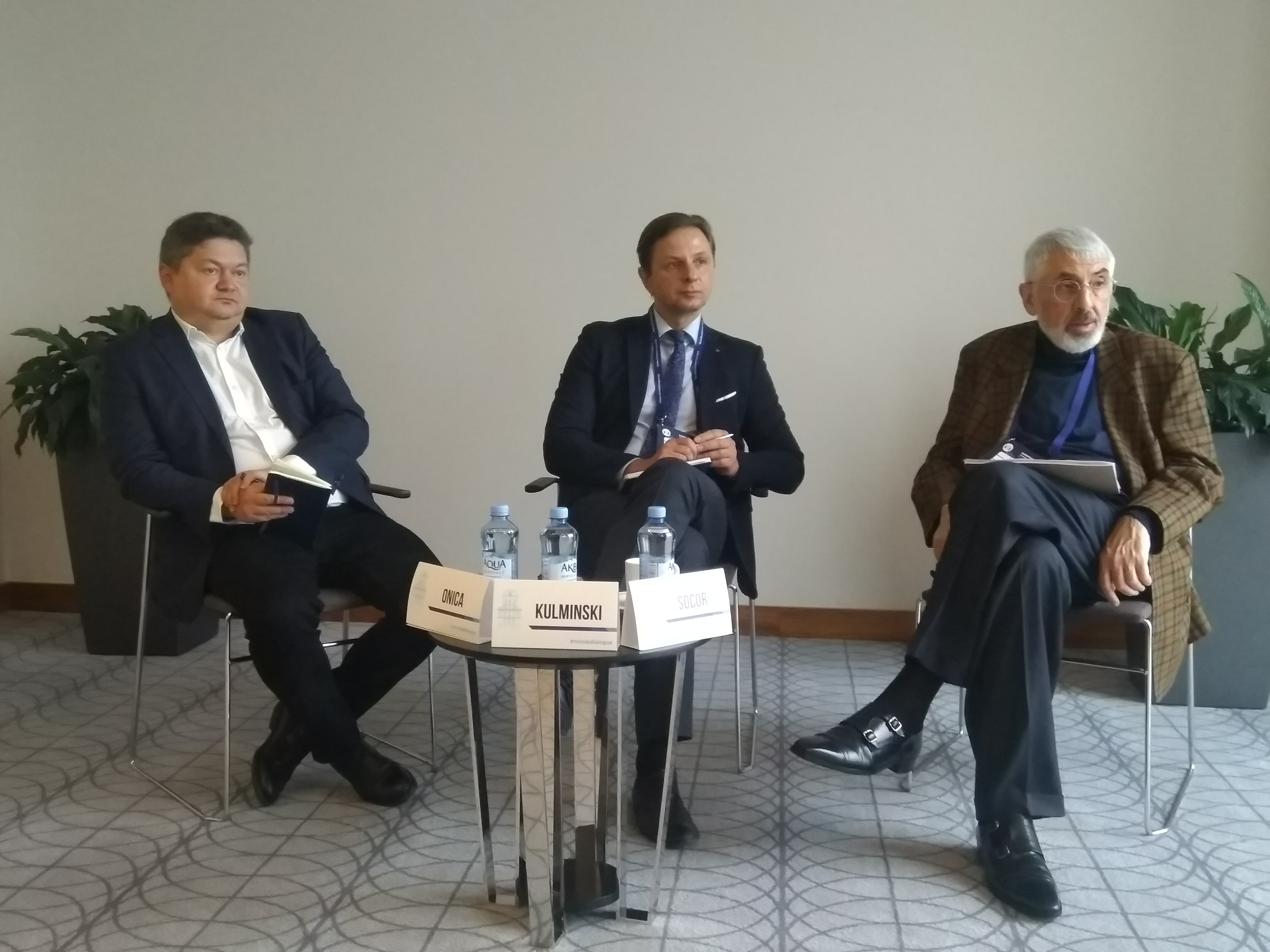
- Timur Onica (left), Vladislav Kulminski (center) and Vladimir Socor (right)
- Born: 3 August 1945; Bucharest, Romania
- Died: 12 August 2025 (aged 80); Munich, Bavaria, Germany
- Citizenship: Romania; United States
- Education: University of Bucharest; Columbia University
- Employer(s): Jamestown Foundation; Radio Free Europe
- Parent(s): Matei Socor and Rodica Socor

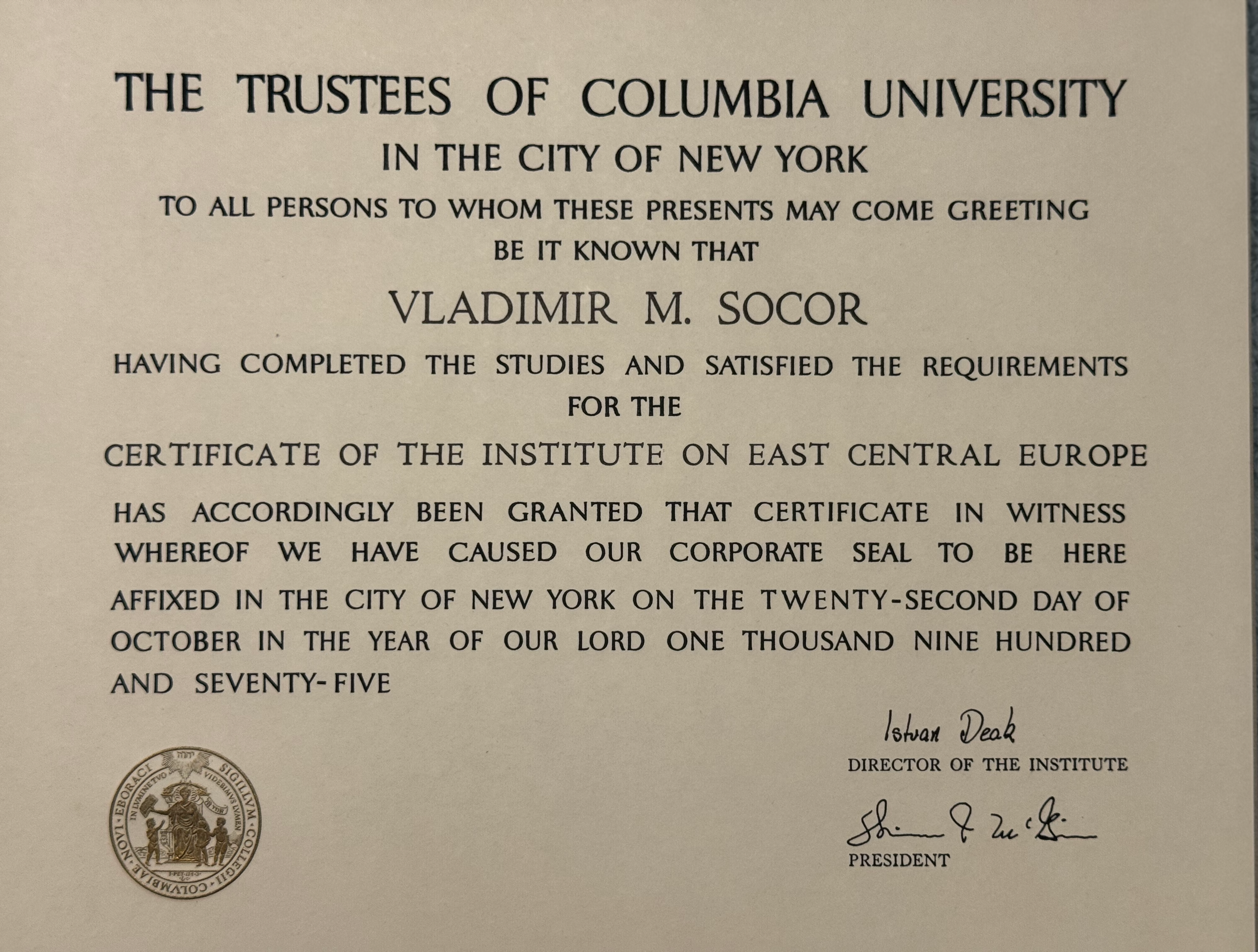
Certification Columbia University

Vladimir Socor (3 August 1945 – 12 August 2025) was a Romanian-American political analyst of East European affairs for the Jamestown Foundation and its Eurasia Daily Monitor, recently resided in Munich, Germany. Socor's main specialization focuses on the political affairs and the ethnic conflicts of the former Soviet republics and the Commonwealth of Independent States.

== Early life and education ==
Vladimir Socor was born on 3 August 1945, as the son of Matei Socor, who, as head of the Romanian Radio Broadcasting Company-was involved in the communist regime's propaganda apparatus, according to the findings of the Tismăneanu Commission.

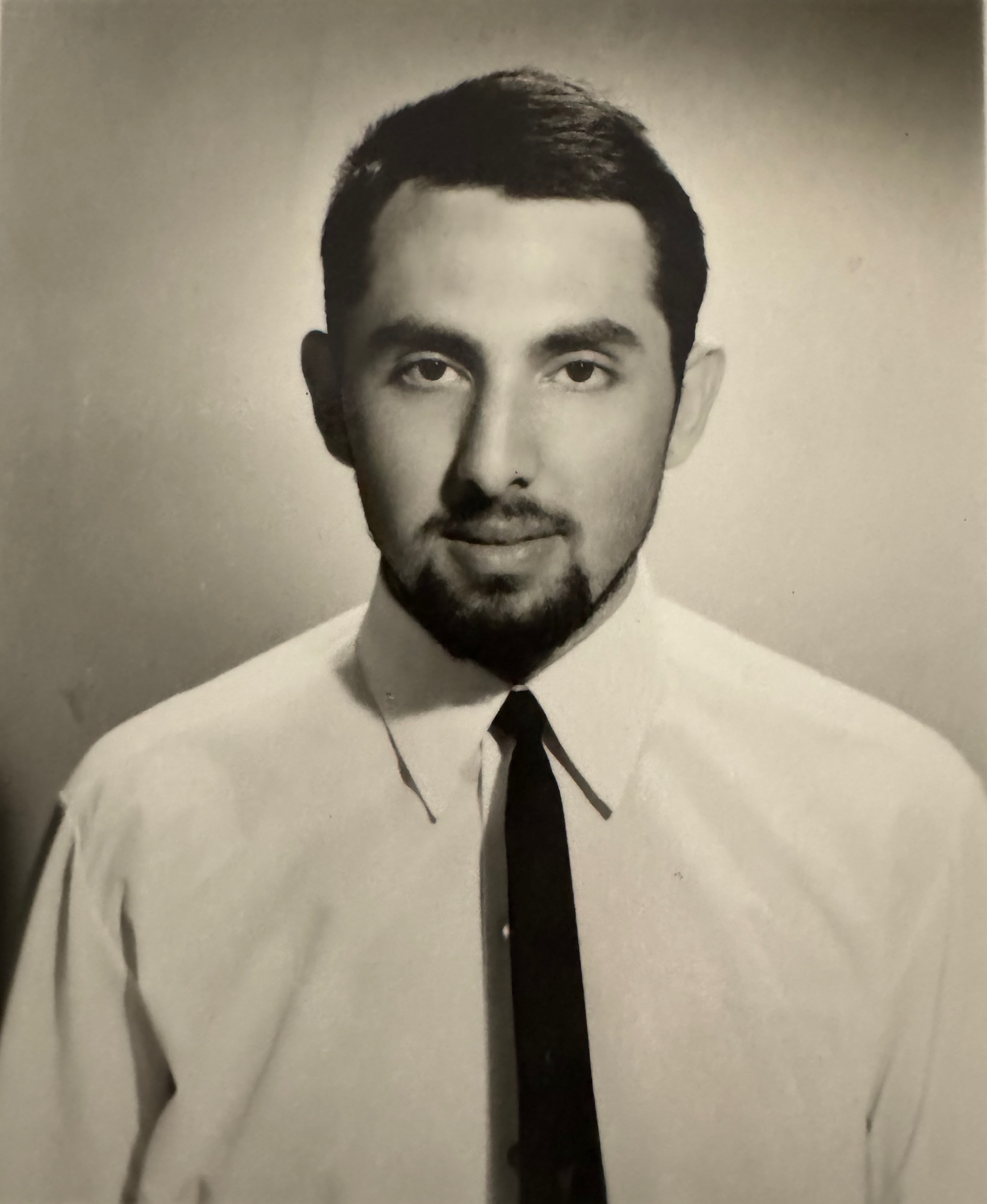
Vladimir Socor in his younger years. Photo from the 70s.

Socor graduated from the #28 High School, also known at that time as the "Petru Groza" High School originally named "School with Russian Language Instruction" in Bucharest currently the Tudor Vianu National High School of Computer Science. He then received a B.A. in History from the University of Bucharest, and after leaving Romania legally in 1972, he received a Master of Philosophy in East European History from Columbia University in 1977.

== Career ==
Socor worked as an analyst for the Radio Free Europe/Radio Liberty Research Institute in Munich (1983–1994) and at the Jamestown Foundation in Washington, D.C. (1995–2002). Between 2002 and 2004, Socor worked as a senior fellow at the Institute for Advanced Strategic and Political Studies in Washington, D.C. Since 2000, he has contributed articles to the European edition of The Wall Street Journal.

He was also critical of Russian president Vladimir Putin's policies regarding the Post-Soviet space and their frozen conflicts—most notably in the separatist enclaves of Transnistria, Abkhazia, and South Ossetia. The Economist journalist Edward Lucas describes Socor as "a hawkish pro-Moldovan."

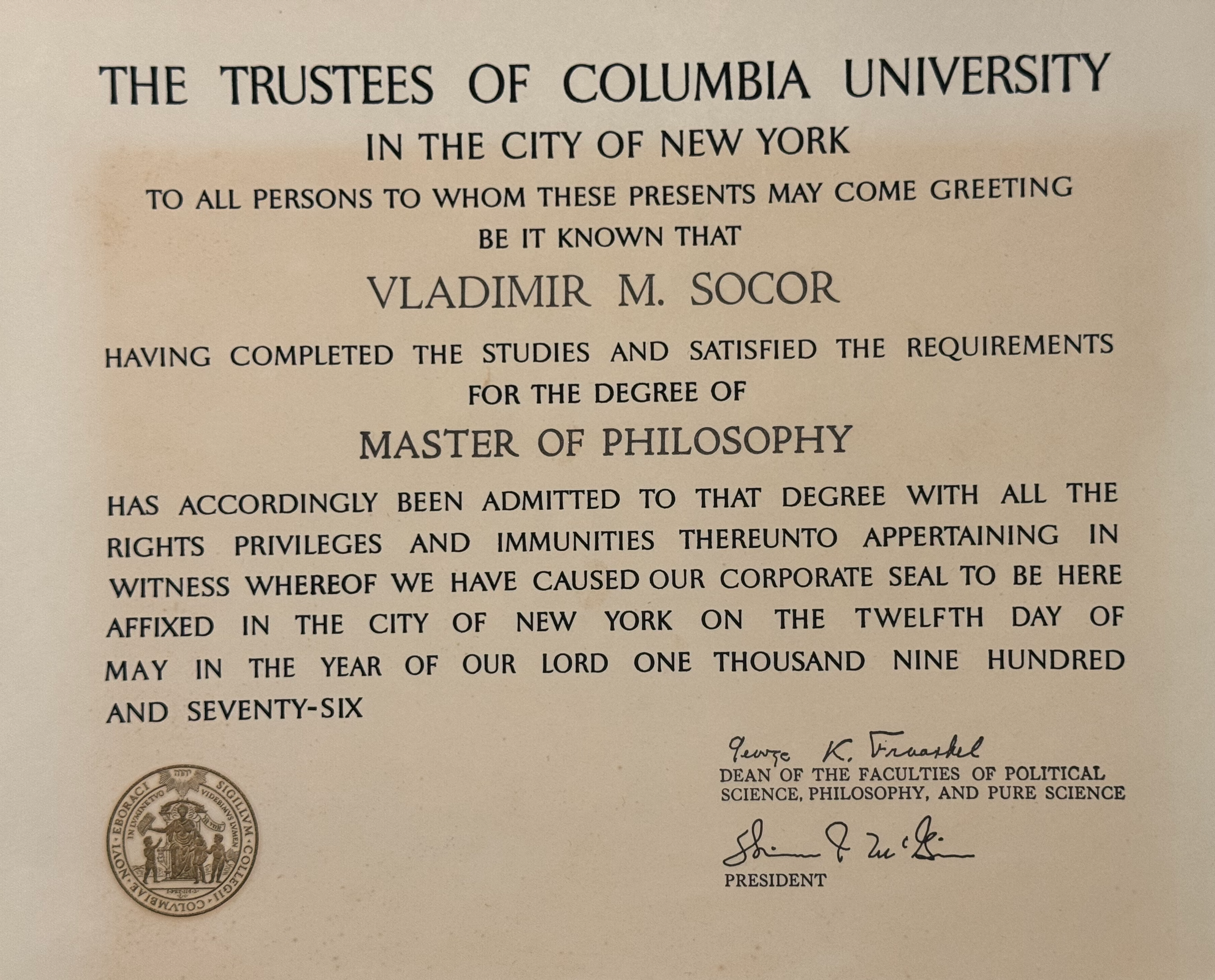
Columbia University - Master of Philosophy

Vladimir Socor was involved in the polemics with the former head of the Organization for Security and Co-operation in Europe (OSCE) mission in Moldova, William Hill, during which Socor criticized OSCE policies in regard to Moldova, and in return was accused by Hill of fallacies and outrageous fabrications.

== Death ==
Socor died in Munich on 12 August 2025, at the age of 80.

== Selected works ==
- Vladimir Socor, September 11 and the Geopolitical Revolution of Our Time, Bucureşti: Ed. Politeia-SNSPA, 2004
- "The Danube–Black Sea Canal: A Graveyard Revisited". catalog.osaarchivum.org. Radio Free Europe. 31 August 1984. hdl:10891/osa:1d1da643-edcd-44f8-8467-73e9f57202f0.
- "The Workers' Protest in Brașov: Assessment and Aftermath", Romania Background Report 231, Radio Free Europe Research, 4 December 1987, pp. 3–10.
- Kremlin Refining Policy in 'Post-Soviet Space', Eurasia Daily Monitor, 8 February 2005
- Russian organizations in Transnistria campaign for a second Kaliningrad, Eurasia Daily Monitor, 11 August 2006
- Kyiv changing ideas, mixing signals on Odessa-Brody oil pipeline, Eurasia Daily Monitor 16 November 2006
- Trans-Black Sea pipeline can bring Caspian gas to Europe, Eurasia Daily Monitor Volume 3, Number 226, 7 December 2006
