= Aurel Baranga =

Romanian playwright and poet

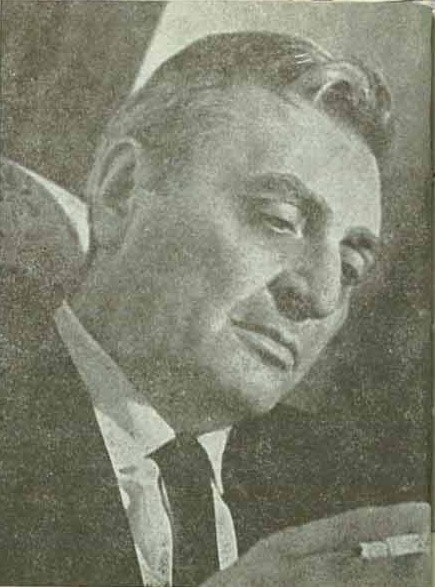
- Born: Aurel Leibovici; June 20, 1913; Bucharest, Kingdom of Romania
- Died: June 10, 1979 (aged 65); Bucharest, Romania
- Education: University of Bucharest
- Occupations: Playwright and poet
- Spouse: Marcela Rusu
- Children: 1
- Writing career
- Years active: 1929–1978
- Genre: Socialist realism

Aurel Baranga (born Aurel Leibovici; June 20, 1913 – June 10, 1979) was a Romanian playwright and poet.

Born into a Jewish family in Bucharest, his parents were company clerk Jean Leibovici and his wife Paulina. He graduated from Matei Basarab High School in 1931 and from the University of Bucharest's medical faculty in 1938. His first published work appeared in 1929 in Bilete de Papagal. Together with Gherasim Luca, he edited Alge magazine in 1930-1931, and also contributed to Unu. His Poeme cu orbi, a volume of avant-garde poetry, appeared in 1933. Between 1934 and 1940, he submitted reportages, satirical pieces and drama reviews to Facla, Cuvântul liber, Reporter, Azi and Lumea românească. During World War II, he joined the Romanian Communist Party. After the coup of 1944 against Romania's pro-Axis dictator, he became an editor of România Liberă, and also worked at Radiodifuziunea Română (1945), Urzica (editor, 1949–1979), the National Theatre Bucharest (1949–1953; 1958–1961) and Viața Românească. He published a volume of reportages, Ninge peste Ucraina (1945); dealing with the Holocaust in Transnistria Governorate, it was among the few accounts on the topic published in immediate postwar Romania. Avant-garde elements persisted in his 1946 book of poetry, Marea furtună. Baranga wrote the lyrics to "Zdrobite cătușe", Romania's national anthem between 1948 and 1953.

Baranga's first play, written in the socialist realist style promoted by the governing Romanian Communist Party, was the 1946 Bal în Făgădău. His first real success came with the comedy Mielul turbat (1954), which featured characters special to his drama, and who reappeared in Adam și Eva (1963), Sfântul Mitică Blajinu (1966), Opinia publică (1967), and Interesul general (1971). Generally speaking, his plays revolve around work and family. His worker-protagonists are functionaries who find themselves in a bureaucratic hierarchy, the stage decor consisting of files, waste-paper baskets and charts on walls, their main activity being the generation of more files. Characters are defined by how they serve the institution: those who show initiative, energy, honesty and devotion to the "general interest" are good; those who place their own interests first and lie, slander, delay and forge in order to attain it are bad. His 1975 Viața unei femei is a psychological drama in which the heroine stages her own past, playing herself. The 1978 Jurnal de atelier features a selection of diary entries covering thirty years and reworked from a 1970s perspective; they include information about the conception and composition of his plays, fragments of poetry, autobiographical notes, sketches of artists and acidic portraits of nomenklatura members, written with the cynicism of a man who was himself the beneficiary of many privileges from the communist regime.

He was the artistic director of the National Theatre Bucharest under director Zaharia Stancu, and a member of the Central Committee of the Communist Party between 1969 and 1974. In 1978, terminally ill, he launched into a self-criticism, addressing a letter to the National Colloquium of Dramatic Literature. There, he recognized the failure of part of his work, confessing that it featured "manipulated mannequins" and "minutely made-up characters", which, as a "rudimentary notion of aesthetics" could reveal, disfigured the reality they sought to convey. He won the State Prize in 1954 and the Prize of the Bucharest Writers' Association in 1975. The ruling party appreciated him for following its directives in his writing, while the public enjoyed his ironic comments toward bureaucracy and demagogy, which seemed to indicate a form of assertiveness. Critic Alex. Ștefănescu describes him as "an I. L. Caragiale produced by communist culture, which means a subdued, decolorized and predictable I. L. Caragiale". According to Vladimir Tismăneanu, "he could have been a real intellectual, he chose to be a buffoon, a valet or a servant. He was too intelligent to be a fanatic, but also too fanatical to be considered intelligent."

With his first wife he had a son, Harry Baranga, who studied at the IATC and then went to work for the Romanian section of the BBC. He later married actress Marcela Rusu. Baranga died in Bucharest at age 65, and was incinerated in the city's Cenușa Crematorium.

== See also ==
- Premiera (1976)
