= Matei Socor =

Romanian composer and communist activist

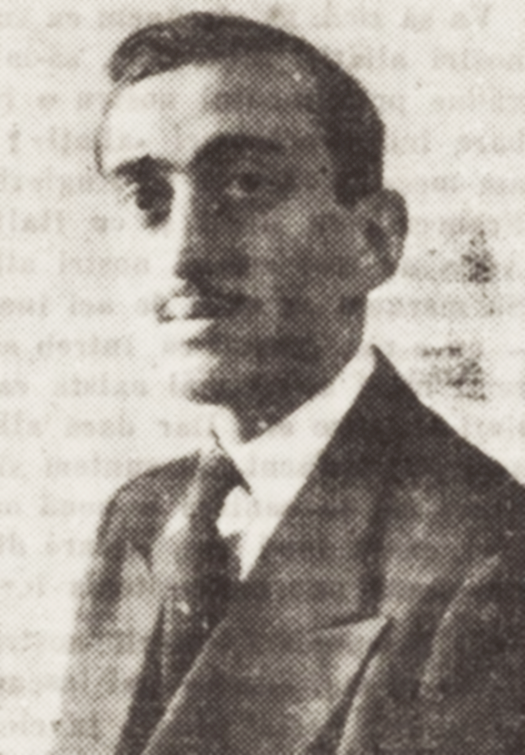
Socor in December 1933

Matei Socor (September 15, 1908 – May 30, 1980) was a Romanian composer and communist activist.

== Biography ==
Born in Iași, his father was the noted journalist Emanoil Socor, who was of Armenian descent. He completed high school in his native city, followed by the Bucharest Conservatory from 1927 to 1929 and the Leipzig Conservatory from 1930 to 1933. In 1929-1930 and 1934-1939, Socor was a collaborator at the Bucharest Folklore Institute. From 1933, he was active as a conductor, both domestically and abroad. He composed music in almost every genre, including choral, vocal symphonic, symphonic, chamber and opera. During the interwar period, he was associated with the avant-garde, as expressed through his interest in twelve-tone technique. Socor entered the banned Romanian Communist Party as a young man. He was active in the National Antifascist Committee, leading to his arrest in 1934, and the Romanian Society for Friendship with the Soviet Union from 1944. He was interned in a camp in 1940 due to his anti-fascist activities, and released in 1943 following appeals from George Enescu and Mihail Jora, who pleaded on behalf of "a young composer of great talent".

In 1945, following the establishment of a communist-dominated government, he was placed in key posts as a propagandist. From 1945 to 1952, he headed Romanian Radio. From 1949 to 1954, he was president of the Romanian Composers' Union, where he served as chief propagandist Leonte Răutu's instrument in the Sovietization of Romanian music. In his post, Socor laid down the ideological parameters for artistic music under the new communist dictatorship and became the ruling party's key representative in its relations with the musical community. Echoing familiar rhetoric of the day, he claimed that western music was undergoing a "full-blown process of decadence", that Paul Hindemith was promoting mysticism while Olivier Messiaen was writing music "that expresses the end of the ages". In other words, he portrayed contemporary western compositions as pessimistic and thus formalist, in contrast with the mobilizing and optimistic spirit furnished by the doctrine of socialist realism.

Along with his rise to power, Socor's own music underwent a dramatic change, being strictly circumscribed within the limits of socialist realism, while he publicly denounced the works of Arnold Schoenberg, Alban Berg and Anton Webern. His compositions during this period included "Zdrobite cătușe", the national anthem between 1948 and 1953; and "Te slăvim, Românie", its successor from 1953 to 1975. He drew inspiration from themes of socialist propaganda. From 1952 to 1957, Socor sat in the Great National Assembly. In 1952, he was elected a corresponding member of the Romanian Academy. In 1971, he was awarded the Order of Tudor Vladimirescu, 2nd class. He died in Bucharest. His wife Florica Ionescu had been a communist party member during the time it was banned, and spent much of her career as a book editor. His son is Vladimir Socor.
