= Dan Deșliu =

Romanian poet (1927–1992)

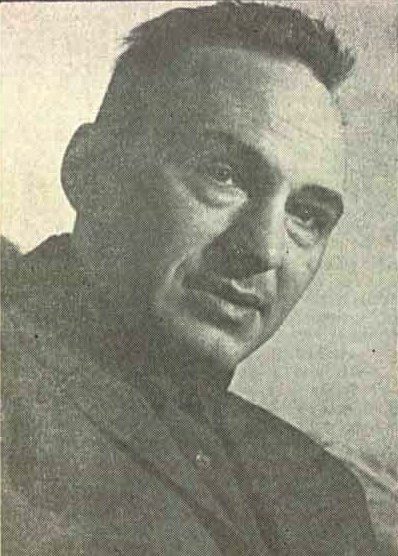
Dan Deșliu

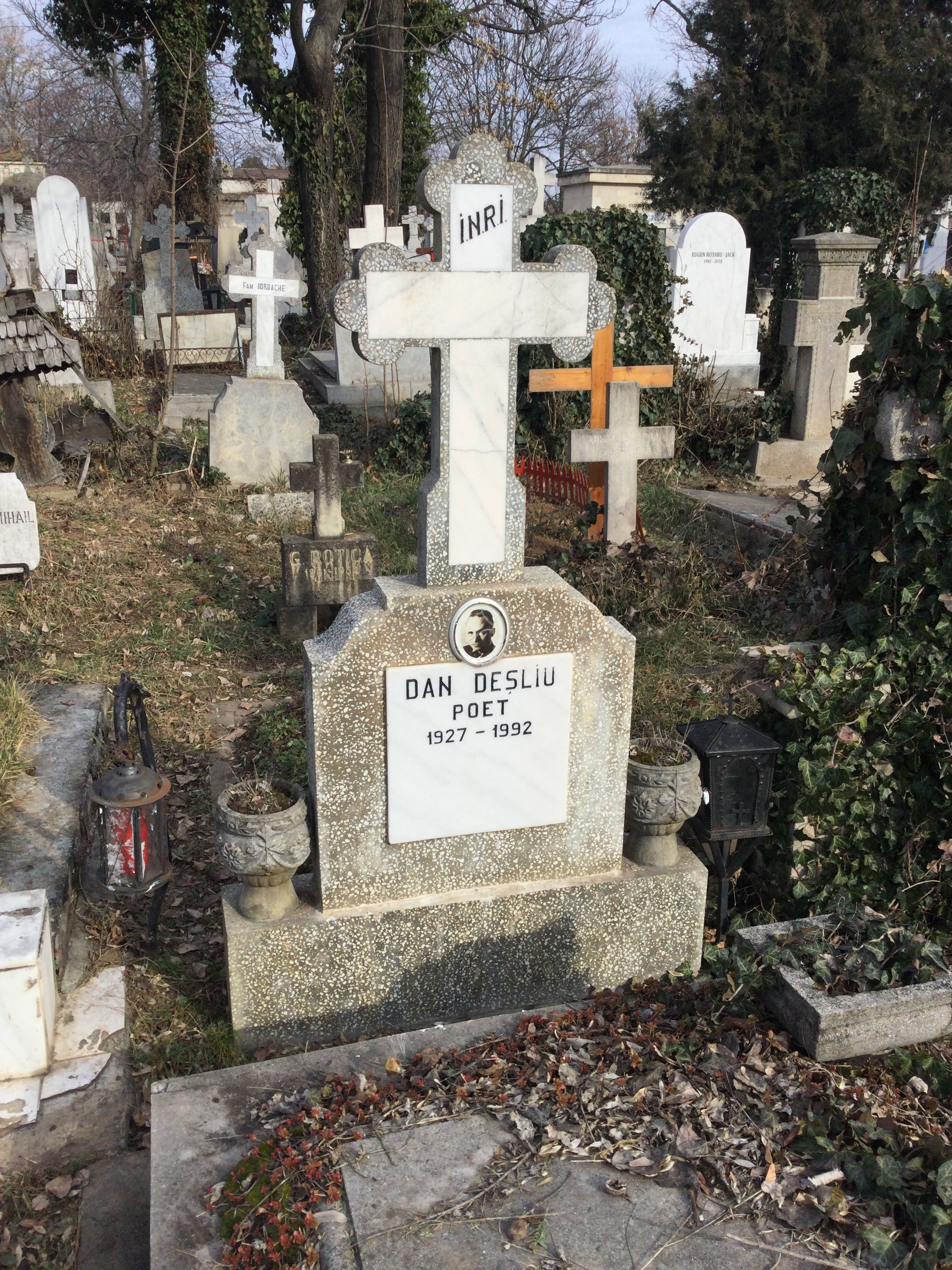
Grave in Bellu Cemetery

Dan Deșliu (August 31, 1927 – September 4, 1992) was a Romanian poet.

Born in Bucharest, his parents were Ștefan Deșliu, an accountant at the Bulandra Theatre company and later administrator of the Workers' Theatre, and his wife Elena (née Săndulescu). He began secondary school at Matei Basarab Lyceum in his native city, followed by the Mediaș aeronautics school and the Bucharest industrial and building high school. He then attended the Dramatic Arts Conservatory under Maria Filotti. From 1946 to 1948, he appeared as an actor at Petroșani and Bucharest, also working as an editor for Flacăra magazine. He was later an editor at Scînteia and, between 1961 and 1962, was editor-in-chief at Luceafărul. His first published work was the sonnet "Paseri", which appeared in George Călinescu's Lumea in 1945; his first book was the 1949 Goarnele inimii. He won the State Prize in 1949, 1950 and 1951. In 1971 he was awarded the Order of Cultural Merit, 2nd class, and in 1974 he received the Romanian Writers' Union Prize for his book Cetatea de pe aer. In 1978, he took the same prize for Un haiduc pe bicicletă. Together with Eugen Frunză, he composed the lyrics for "Te slăvim, Românie", which served as Romania's national anthem from 1953 to 1975.

During the 1940s and 1950s, he quickly came to the literary forefront as a representative poet of his era, much lauded for his militant socialist realist poetry that enthusiastically chronicled the events of the day. This was embodied by his first book as well as the ones that followed across the next decade: Lazăr de la Rusca (1949), Minerii din Maramureș (1951), Cântec de ruină (1957), and Ceva mai greu (1958). Afterwards, he attempted a shift toward a skeptically elegiac, obsessive lyricism that dealt with regret and lack of fulfillment (Cercuri de copac, 1962; Drumul spre Dikson, 1969; Cetatea de pe aer, 1974).

Starting in 1962 and particularly from 1970, he began to criticize the policies of the Romanian Communist Party, and as a result was placed under thorough surveillance by the Securitate secret police. In the 1980s, he turned toward open dissidence, repudiating his "revolutionary" past, quitting the party in 1980 and directly criticizing dictator Nicolae Ceaușescu, whom he accused of behaving as if he were "the owner of Romania". In March 1989, he sent an open letter to Radio Free Europe decrying the domestic situation in his country, prompting his placement under house arrest. During the Romanian Revolution that December, he was named a member of the National Salvation Front Council.

An excellent swimmer, Deșliu drowned at Neptun nearly three years after the Revolution; it is unknown whether his death was accidental or deliberate. After a thorough search covering the 20 km (12 mi) between Costinești and Vama Veche, his intact body was found after eight days beside the dock of Ceaușescu's former villa in Neptun. A diary of his, likely written in 1990–1991, appeared in 2001. A street in 23 August, Constanța County bears his name, and he is buried at Bellu Cemetery in Bucharest.
