= Zdrobite cătușe =

Romanian national anthem from 1948 to 1953

English: Broken Shackles
- Former national anthem of Romanian People's Republic
- Lyrics: Aurel Baranga
- Music: Matei Socor
- Adopted: 1948
- Relinquished: 1953

Audio sample
- Zdrobite cătușe: file; help

"Zdrobite cătușe" (Broken Shackles) was the national anthem of the Romanian People's Republic between 1948 and 1953. The lyrics were written by Aurel Baranga and the music by Matei Socor.

== Lyrics ==
Romanian lyrics

Zdrobite cătușe în urmă rămân
În frunte-i mereu muncitorul,
Prin lupte și jertfe o treaptă urcăm,
Stăpân pe destin e poporul!

Cor:
Trăiască, trăiască, republica noastră,
În marș de năvalnic șuvoi revărsat;
Muncitori și țărani, cărturari și ostași,
Zidim România republicii noi!

În lături cu putredul vechi stăvilar
E ceasul de sfântă’ncordare.
Unirea și pacea și munca-i stegar
Republicii noi populare!

Cor

Spre țelul victoriei mari ne-ndreptăm
E ceas de izbânzi viitoare
Credință în muncă și luptă jurăm
Republicii noi populare.

Cor

English translation

Broken shackles are left behind
The worker is always in the front
Through fights and sacrifices a step we climb
The people are masters of their destiny.

Chorus:
Long live, long live our Republic
In a march of a tempestuous torrent
Workers and peasants, intellectuals and soldiers
We’re building Romania of the new Republic

Eliminating the old putrid dam
It’s the hour of holy suspense
Union and peace and work are carrying the flag
Of the new People's Republic

Chorus

By the great victory we are going,
It is time for future triumphs.
We swear that we will work closely and fight
By the new Republic.

Chorus
