= Te slăvim, Românie =

Former national anthem of Romania (1953–1975)

English: "We Glorify Thee, Romania"
- Former national anthem of Romania
- Lyrics: Eugen Frunză; Dan Deșliu
- Music: Matei Socor
- Adopted: 1953
- Relinquished: 1975

Audio sample
- Vocal rendition: file; help

Instrumental recording of the anthem

"Te slăvim, Românie" ("We Glorify Thee, Romania") was the national anthem of the Romanian People's Republic, and later Socialist Republic of Romania between 1953 and 1975. The lyrics were written by Eugen Frunză and Dan Deșliu, the music by Matei Socor. It mentions Romania's brotherhood with the Soviet Union and praises Leninist ideology.

In the 1960s, in line with Romania's de-satellization, the reference to the "Soviet liberators" in the anthem was dropped.

It was replaced by "E scris pe tricolor Unire" in 1975, which only lasted until 1977 as Romania's anthem.

== Lyrics ==
Romanian original

Te slăvim, Românie, pământ părintesc,
Mândre plaiuri sub cerul tău pașnic rodesc,
E zdrobit al trecutului jug blestemat,
Nu zadarnic străbunii eroi au luptat,
Astăzi noi împlinim visul lor minunat.

Refren:
Puternică, liberă,
Pe soartă stăpână
Trăiască Republica
Populară Română!

Înfrățit fi-va veșnic al nostru popor
Cu poporul sovietic eliberator.
Leninismul ni-e far și tărie și-avânt,
Noi urmăm cu credință Partidul ne-nfrânt,
Făurim socialismul pe-al țării pământ.

Refren

Noi uzine clădim, rodul holdei sporim,
Vrem în pace cu orice popor să trăim,
Dar dușmanii de-ar fi să ne calce în prag,
Îi vom frânge în numele-a tot ce ni-e drag,
Înălța-vom spre glorie-al Patriei steag

Refren

English translation

We glorify thee, Romania, our Fatherland
Yielding are the proud lands under thy peaceful sky
Smashed is the cursed yoke of the past
'Twas not in vain that our heroic forebears fought;
Today we fulfill their wonderful thought.

Refrain:
Powerful, liberated,
Master of thy fate
Long live the Romanian
People's Republic!

May our people be brothers forever
With the Soviet people our savior
Leninism's our lighthouse, our force and momentum
We follow with faith our invincible Party
We create on our homeland socialism.

Refrain

We build new factories, the land's yield we increase
We want to live with all peoples in peace
But if our enemies come to trample us
We'll defeat them in the name of everything we love
And we'll rise to glorify our Fatherland's flag.

Refrain
