= Socialist Republic of Romania =

Romanian state from 1947 to 1989

Romanian People's Republic (1947–1965) Republica Populară Română (1947–1953; 1964–1965) Republica Populară Romînă (1953–1964) Socialist Republic of Romania (1965–1989) Republica Socialistă România
- 1947–1989
- Flag (1965–1989) Emblem (1965–1989)
- Motto: Proletari din toate țările, uniți-vă! ("Proletarians of all countries, unite!")
- Anthem: Trăiască Regele (1947–1948) Zdrobite cătușe (1948–1953) Te slăvim, Românie (1953–1975) E scris pe tricolor Unire (1975–1977) Trei culori (1977–1989)
- The Socialist Republic of Romania in 1989 in dark green
- Status: Warsaw Pact member
- Capital and largest city: Bucharest
- Official languages: Romanian
- Religion: State atheism (de jure); Romanian Orthodox (dominant)
- Demonym: Romanian
- Government: Unitary communist state
- De facto leader
  - 1947–1952: Ana Pauker and Gheorghe Gheorghiu-Dej
  - 1952–1965: Gheorghe Gheorghiu-Dej
  - 1965–1989: Nicolae Ceaușescu
  - 1989: Ion Iliescu
- Head of state
  - 1947–1952 (first): Constantin Ion Parhon
  - 1989 (last): Ion Iliescu
- Head of government
  - 1947–1952 (first): Petru Groza
  - 1989 (last): Petre Roman
- Legislature: Great National Assembly
- Historical era: Cold War
  - Forced abdication of Michael I: 30 December 1947
  - First constitution: 13 April 1948
  - Second constitution: 24 September 1952
  - De-satellization: 22 April 1964
  - Last constitution: 21 August 1965
  - Fall of Ceaușescu: 22 December 1989
  - Name changed to "Romania": 28 December 1989
  - Formally abolished: 8 December 1991
- GDP (PPP): 1989 estimate
  - Total: $80 billion
  - Per capita: $3,447
- HDI (1990 formula): 0.863 very high
- Currency: Leu
- Calling code: 40
- ISO 3166 code: RO
Preceded by	Succeeded by
Kingdom of Romania	Romania

The Socialist Republic of Romania (Romanian: Republica Socialistă România, RSR) was a communist state that existed from 1947 to the Romanian revolution in 1989. From 1947 to 1965, the state was known as the Romanian People's Republic (Republica Populară Romînă, RPR). The RSR was an Eastern Bloc state and a member of the Warsaw Pact with a dominant role for the Romanian Communist Party enshrined in its constitutions. Geographically, RSR was bordered by the Black Sea to the east, the Soviet Union (via the Ukrainian and Moldavian SSRs) to the north and east, Hungary and Yugoslavia (via SR Serbia) to the west, and Bulgaria to the south.

As World War II ended, the Kingdom of Romania, a former Axis member which had overthrown their pro-Axis government, was occupied by the Soviet Union as the sole representative of the Allies. On 6 March 1945, after mass demonstrations by communist sympathizers and political pressure from the Soviet representative of the Allied Commission, a new pro-Soviet government that included members of the previously outlawed Romanian Workers' Party was installed. Gradually, more members of the Workers' Party and communist-aligned parties gained control of the administration and pre-war political leaders were steadily eliminated from political life. In December 1947, King Michael I was forced to abdicate and the People's Republic of Romania was declared.

At first, Romania's scarce post-war resources were drained by the "SovRoms," new tax-exempt Soviet-Romanian companies that allowed the Soviet Union to control Romania's major sources of income. Another drain was the war reparations paid to the Soviet Union. However, during the 1950s, Romania's communist government began to assert more independence, leading to, for example, the withdrawal of all Soviet troops from Romania by 1958. Overall, from the 1950s to the 1970s, the country exhibited high rates of economic growth and significant improvements in infant mortality, life expectancy, literacy, urbanization, and women's rights, but then stagnated in the 1980s.

In the 1960s and 1970s, Nicolae Ceaușescu became General Secretary of the Communist Party (1965), Chairman of the State Council (1967), and the newly established role of President in 1974. Ceaușescu's denunciation of the 1968 Soviet invasion of Czechoslovakia and a brief relaxation in internal repression led to a positive image both at home and in the West. However, rapid economic growth fueled in part by foreign credits gradually gave way to austerity and increased repression that ultimately reached totalitarian levels. By the 1970s, Ceaușescu presided over one of the most repressive regimes of modern times. It lasted until he was violently overthrown and executed in December 1989.

Many people were arrested, executed or died in custody under communist Romania, most during the Stalinist era of the 1950s, for political, economical, or other reasons. Tens or even hundreds of thousands were arrested, executed or died in custody, while judicial executions between 1945 and 1964 numbered 137, deaths in custody are estimated in the tens or hundreds of thousands.

The 1965 Constitution remained in effect after its dissolution and was amended to reflect Romania's transition to democracy. It was replaced by the current constitution on 8 December 1991, after a nationwide referendum abolished the socialist system of government completely and replaced it with a semi-presidential system.

== History ==
=== Soviet occupation and rise of the Communists ===
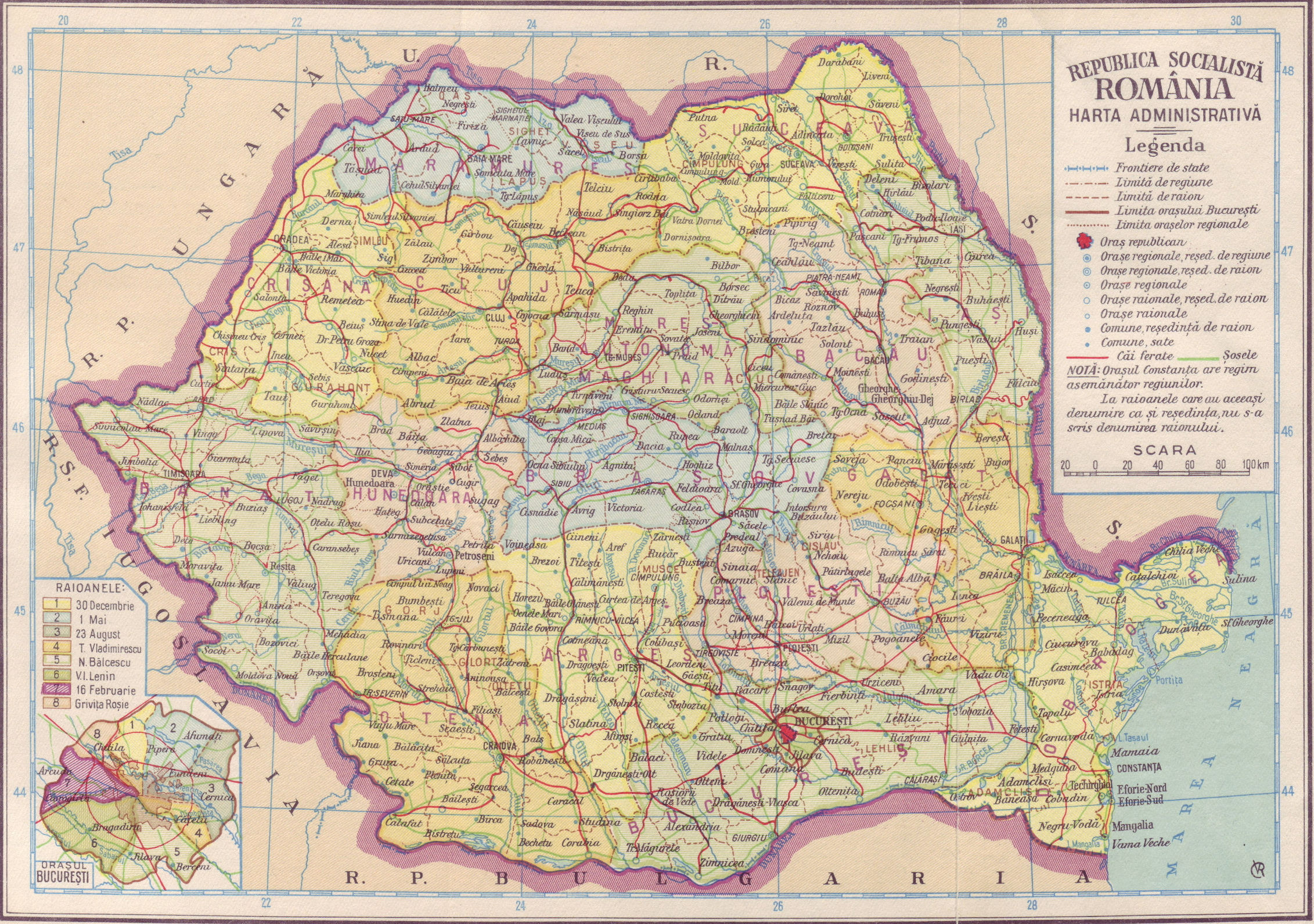
The Socialist Republic of Romania in 1966

When King Michael, supported by the main political parties, overthrew Ion Antonescu in August 1944, breaking Romania away from the Axis and bringing it over to the Allied side, Michael could do nothing to erase the memory of his country's recent active participation in the German invasion of the Soviet Union. Romanian forces fought under Soviet command, driving through Northern Transylvania into Hungary proper, and on into Czechoslovakia and Austria. However, the Soviets treated Romania as a conquered territory, and Soviet troops continued to occupy the country on the basis of the Romanians having been active Nazi allies with a fascist government until very recently.

The Yalta Conference had granted the Soviet Union a predominant interest in Romania. The Paris Peace Treaties did not acknowledge Romania as an allied co-belligerent, as the Romanian army had fought hard against the Soviets for the better part of the war, changing sides only when the tides started to turn. The Communists, as all political parties, played only a minor role in King Michael's first wartime government, headed by General Constantin Sănătescu, though their presence increased in the one led by Nicolae Rădescu. This changed in March 1945, when Dr. Petru Groza of the Ploughmen's Front, a party closely associated with the Communists, became prime minister. His government was broad-based on paper, including members of most major prewar parties except the fascist Iron Guard. However, the Communists held the key ministries, and most of the ministers nominally representing non-Communist parties were, like Groza himself, fellow travelers.

The King was not happy with the direction of this government, but when he attempted to force Groza's resignation by refusing to sign any legislation (a move known as "the royal strike"), Groza simply chose to enact laws without bothering to obtain Michael's signature. On 8 November 1945, King Michael's name day, a pro-monarchy demonstration in front of the Royal Palace in Bucharest escalated into street fights between opposition supporters and soldiers, police and pro-government workers, resulting in dozens of killed and wounded; Soviet officers restrained Romanian soldiers and police from firing on civilians, and Soviet troops restored order.

Despite the King's disapproval, the first Groza government brought land reform and women's suffrage, the former giving the party widespread popularity among peasants from the south and east, while the latter gained it the support of educated women. However, it also brought the beginnings of Soviet domination of Romania. In the elections of 19 November 1946, the Communist-led Bloc of Democratic Parties (BPD) claimed 84% of the votes. These elections were characterized by widespread irregularities, including intimidation, electoral fraud, and assassinations Archives confirm suspicions at the time that the election results were, in fact, falsified.

After forming a government, the Communists moved to eliminate the role of the centrist parties; notably, the National Peasants' Party was accused of espionage after it became clear in 1947 that their leaders were meeting secretly with United States officials. A show trial of their leadership was then arranged, and they were put in jail. Other parties were forced to "merge" with the Communists. In 1946 and 1947, several high-ranking members in the pro-Axis government were executed as war criminals, primarily for their involvement in the Holocaust and for attacking the Soviet Union. Antonescu himself was executed on 1 June 1946.

By 1947, Romania remained the only monarchy in the Eastern Bloc. On 30 December that year, Michael was at his palace in Sinaia when Groza and Gheorghiu-Dej summoned him back to Bucharest. They presented him with a pretyped instrument of abdication and demanded that he sign it. With pro-Communist troops surrounding his palace and his telephone lines cut, Michael signed the document.

=== Romanian People's Republic ===
==== 1947–48 takeover ====
On 30 December 1947, only hours after Michael abdicated, Parliament abolished the monarchy and proclaimed Romania a socialist republic. In February 1948, the Communists merged with the Social Democrats to form the Romanian Workers' Party. However, most independent-minded Socialists were soon pushed out. Meanwhile, many non-Communist politicians had either been imprisoned or fled into exile.

The communist regime was formalized with the constitution of 13 April 1948. The new constitution was a near-copy of the 1936 Soviet Constitution. While it guaranteed all manner of freedoms on paper, any association which had a "fascist or anti-democratic nature" was forbidden. This provision was broadly interpreted to ban any party not willing to do the Communists' bidding and gave a legal façade to political repression.

Religion

Although the 1948 Constitution and its two successors provided a simulacrum of religious freedom, the regime in fact had a policy of promoting Marxist–Leninist atheism, coupled with religious persecution. The role of religious bodies was strictly limited to their houses of worship, and large public demonstrations were strictly forbidden. In 1948, in order to minimize the role of the clergy in society, the government adopted a decree nationalizing church property, including schools. The regime found wiser to use religion and make it subservient to the regime rather than to eradicate it. The communist government also disbanded the Romanian Greek-Catholic Uniate Church, declaring its merger with the Romanian Orthodox Church.

==== Early years ====
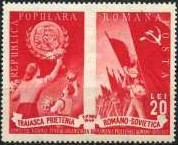
1949 stamp celebrating Romanian-Soviet friendship.

The early years of communist rule in Romania were marked by repeated changes of course and by numerous arrests and imprisonments as factions contended for dominance. The country's resources were also drained by the Soviet's SovRom agreements, which facilitated shipping of Romanian goods to the Soviet Union at nominal prices.

On 11 June 1948, all banks and large businesses were nationalized.

In the communist leadership, there appear to have been three important factions, all of them Stalinist, differentiated more by their respective personal histories than by any deep political or philosophical differences. Later historiography claimed to identify the following factions: the "Muscovites", notably Ana Pauker and Vasile Luca, who had spent the war in Moscow and the "Prison Communists", notably Gheorghe Gheorghiu-Dej, who had been imprisoned during the war.

Pauker and her allies were accused of deviating to the left and right. For instance, they were initially allied on not liquidating the rural bourgeoise but later shifted their position. Ultimately, with Joseph Stalin's backing, Gheorghiu-Dej won out. Pauker was purged from the party (along with 192,000 other party members); Pătrășcanu was executed after a show trial.

==== Gheorghiu-Dej era ====
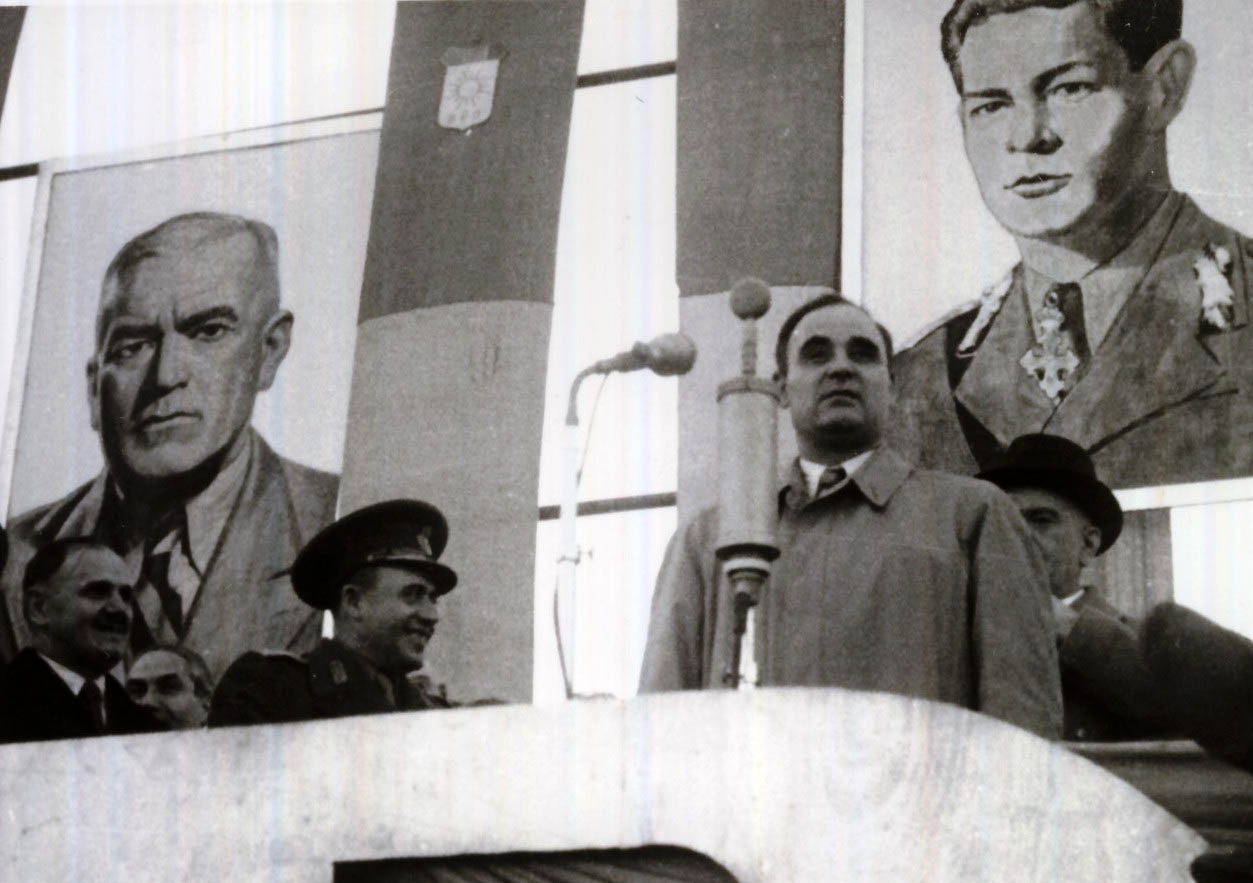
Gheorghe Gheorghiu-Dej speaking at a workers' rally in Nation Square, Bucharest after the 1946 general election

Gheorghiu-Dej, a committed Stalinist, was unhappy with the reforms in Nikita Khrushchev's Soviet Union after Stalin's death in 1953. He also balked at Comecon's goal of turning Romania into the "breadbasket" of the East Bloc, pursuing an economic plan based on heavy industry and energy production. The government closed Romania's largest labor camps, abandoned the Danube–Black Sea Canal project, halted rationing and hiked workers' wages. These factors combined to put Romania under Gheorghiu-Dej on a relatively independent and nationalist route.

Gheorghiu-Dej identified with Stalinism, and the more liberal Soviet government threatened to undermine his authority. In an effort to reinforce his position, Gheorghiu-Dej pledged cooperation with any state, regardless of political-economic system, as long as it recognized international equality and did not interfere in other nations' domestic affairs. This policy led to a tightening of Romania's bonds with China, which also advocated national self-determination and opposed Soviet hegemonism.

Gheorghiu-Dej resigned as the party's general secretary in 1954 but retained the premiership; a four-member collective secretariat, including Nicolae Ceaușescu, controlled the party for a year before Gheorghiu-Dej again took up the reins. Despite its new policy of international cooperation, Romania joined the Warsaw Treaty Organization (Warsaw Pact) in 1955, which entailed subordinating and integrating a portion of its military into the Soviet military machine. Romania later refused to allow Warsaw Pact maneuvers on its soil and limited its participation in military maneuvers elsewhere within the alliance.

In 1956, the Soviet premier, Nikita Khrushchev, denounced Stalin in a secret speech before the Twentieth Congress of the Communist Party of the Soviet Union (CPSU). Gheorghiu-Dej and the leadership of the Romanian Workers' Party (Partidul Muncitoresc Român, PMR) were fully braced to weather de-Stalinization. Gheorghiu-Dej made Pauker, Luca and Georgescu scapegoats for the Romanian communist past excesses and claimed that the Romanian party had purged its Stalinist elements even before Stalin died in 1953. In all likelihood, Gheorghiu-Dej himself ordered the violence and coercion in the collectivization movements, since he did not rebuke those who perpetuated abuses. In fact, Pauker reprimanded any cadre who forced peasants, and once she was purged, the violence reappeared.

In October 1956, Poland's communist leaders refused to succumb to Soviet military threats to intervene in domestic political affairs and install a more obedient politburo. A few weeks later, the Communist Party in Hungary virtually disintegrated during a popular revolution. Poland's defiance and Hungary's popular uprising inspired Romanian students to organize meetings in București, Cluj and Timișoara calling for liberty, better living conditions, and an end to Soviet domination. Under the pretext that the Hungarian uprising might incite his nation's own revolt, Gheorghiu-Dej took radical measures which meant persecutions and jailing of various "suspects", especially people of Hungarian origin. He also advocated swift Soviet intervention, and the Soviet Union reinforced its military presence in Romania, particularly along the Hungarian border. Although Romania's unrest proved fragmentary and controllable, Hungary's was not, so in November Moscow mounted an invasion against Hungary.

After the Revolution of 1956, Gheorghiu-Dej worked closely with Hungary's new leader, János Kádár, who was installed by the Soviet Union. Romania took Hungary's former premier (leader of the 1956 revolution) Imre Nagy into custody. He was jailed at Snagov, north of Bucharest. After a series of interrogations by Soviets and Romanian authorities, Nagy was returned to Budapest for trial and execution.

Romania's government also took measures to reduce public discontent by reducing investments in heavy industry, boosting output of consumer goods, decentralizing economic management, hiking wages and incentives, and instituting elements of worker management. The authorities eliminated compulsory deliveries for private farmers but reaccelerated the collectivization program in the mid-1950s, albeit less brutally than earlier. The government declared collectivization complete in 1962, when collective and state farms controlled 77% of the arable land.

Despite Gheorghiu-Dej's claim that he had purged the Romanian party of Stalinists, he remained susceptible to attack for his obvious complicity in the party's activities from 1944 to 1953. At a plenary PMR meeting in March 1956, Miron Constantinescu and Iosif Chișinevschi, both Politburo members and deputy premiers, criticized Gheorghiu-Dej. Constantinescu, who advocated a Khrushchev-style liberalization, posed a particular threat to Gheorghiu-Dej because he enjoyed good connections with the Moscow leadership. The PMR purged Constantinescu and Chișinevschi in 1957, denouncing both as Stalinists and charging them with complicity with Pauker. Afterwards, Gheorghiu-Dej faced no serious challenge to his leadership. Ceaușescu replaced Constantinescu as head of PMR cadres.

The cadres—anyone who was not a rank-and-file member of the Communist Party—were deemed the Party's vanguard, as they were entrusted with the power to construct a new social order and the forms of power that would sustain it. They still underwent extensive surveillance, which created an environment of competition and rivalry.

==== Persecution, the labour camp system and anti-communist resistance ====
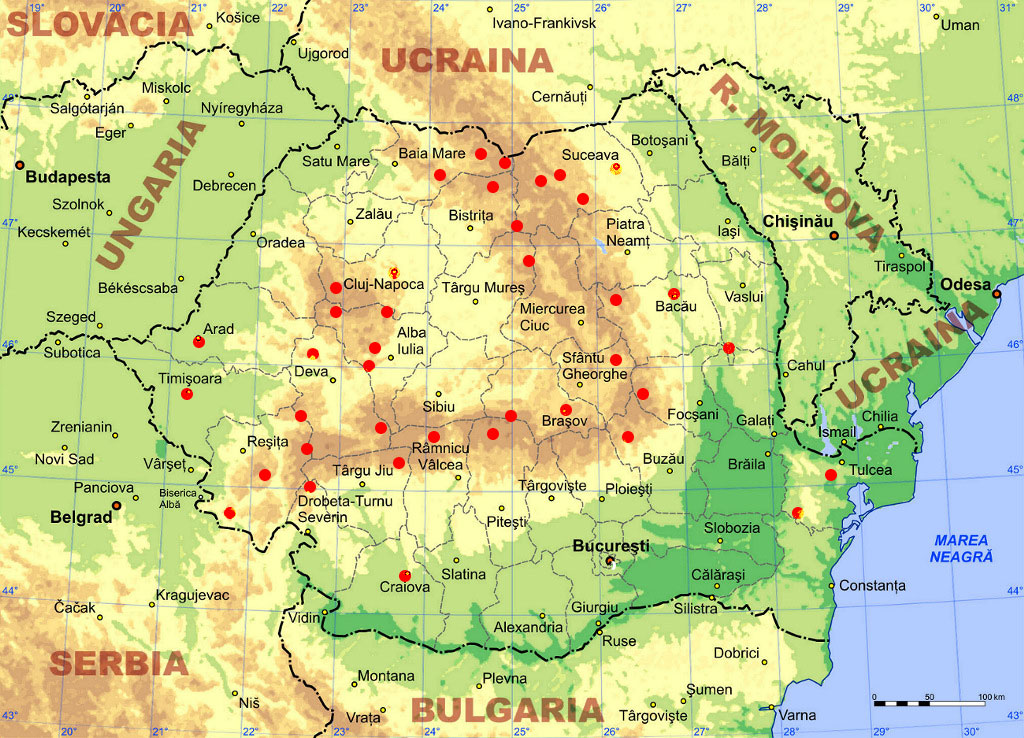
Armed resistance against the government

Once the Communist government became more entrenched, the number of arrests increased. The General Directorate of People's Security, or 'Securitate', was established in 1948 with the stated aim "to defend the democratic conquest and to ensure the security of the Romanian People’s Republic against the plotting of internal and external enemies".

All strata of society were involved, but particularly targeted were the prewar elites, such as intellectuals, clerics, teachers, former politicians (even if they had left-leaning views), and anybody who could potentially form the nucleus of anti-Communist resistance. According to figures, in the years between 1945 and 1964, 73,334 people were arrested.

The existing prisons were filled with political prisoners, and a new system of forced labor camps and prisons was created, modeled after the Soviet Gulag. A decision to put into practice the century-old project for a Danube–Black Sea Canal served as a pretext for the erection of several labor camps, where numerous people died. Some of the most notorious prisons included Sighet, Gherla, Pitești, and Aiud, and forced labor camps were set up at lead mines and in the Danube Delta.

One of the most notorious and infamous brainwashing experiments in Eastern Europe's history took place in Romania, in the political prison of Pitești, a small city about 120 km (75 mi) northwest of Bucharest. This prison is still infamous in Romania for the so-called 'Pitești experiment' or Pitești phenomenon, conducted there between 1949 and 1952. The prison in Pitești and the Pitești experiment aimed to 'reeducate' the (real or imagined) opponents of the regime. It involved psychological and physical torture of prisoners, and the submission of them to humiliating, degrading and dehumanizing acts. Tens of people died in this 'experiment', but its aim was not to kill the people, but to 'reeducate' them. Some of those who were thus 'reeducated' later became torturers themselves. Of those who survived Pitești, many either took their own lives or ended up in mental institutions.

The Communist government also decided on the deportation of peasants from the Banat (south-west from Transylvania, at the border with Yugoslavia), started on 18 June 1951. About 45,000 people were forcibly "resettled" in lesser populated regions on the eastern plains (Bărăgan). The government decision was directed towards creating a cordon sanitaire against Tito's Yugoslavia, but was also used as an intimidation tactic to force the remaining peasants to join collective farms. Most deportees lived in the Bărăgan for 5 years (until 1956), but some remained there permanently.

Anti-communist resistance also had an organized form, and many people opposing the government took up arms and formed partisan groups, comprising 10–40 people. There were attacks on police posts and sabotage. Some of the famous partisans were Elisabeta Rizea from Nucșoara and Gheorghe Arsenescu. Despite the numerous secret police (Securitate) and army troops massed against them, armed resistance in the mountains continued until the early 1960s, and one of the best known partisan leaders was not captured until 1974.

Another form of anti-communist resistance, non-violent this time, was the student movement of 1956. In reaction to the anti-communist revolt in Hungary, echoes were felt all over the Eastern bloc. Protests took place in some university centers resulting in numerous arrests and expulsions. The most-organised student movement was in Timișoara, where 3000 were arrested. In Bucharest and Cluj, organised groups were set up which tried to make common cause with the anti-communist movement in Hungary and coordinate activity. The authorities' reaction was immediate – students were arrested or suspended from their courses, some teachers were dismissed, and new associations were set up to supervise student activities.

Tens of thousands of people were killed as part of repression and agricultural collectivization in Communist Romania primarily under Gheorghiu-Dej.

=== Ceaușescu government ===
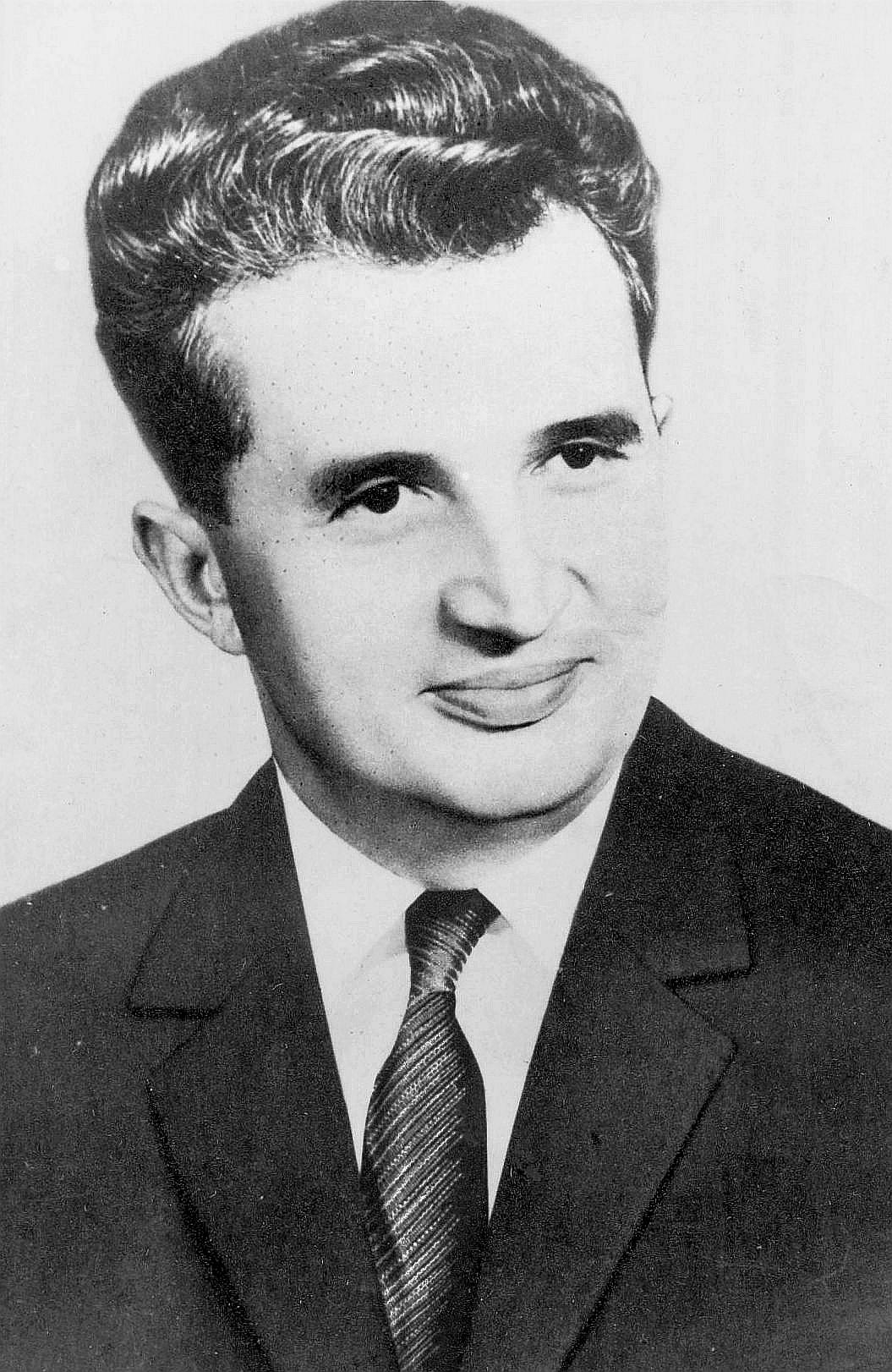
Nicolae Ceaușescu, Leader of Romania from 1965 to 1989

Gheorghiu-Dej died in 1965 and, after a power struggle, was succeeded by the previously obscure Nicolae Ceaușescu. During his last two years, Gheorghiu-Dej had exploited the Soviet–Chinese dispute and begun to oppose the hegemony of the Soviet Union. Ceaușescu, supported by colleagues of Gheorghiu-Dej such as Maurer, continued this popular line. Relations with Western countries and many other states began to be strengthened in what seemed to be the national interest of Romania. Under a policy of de-Russification the forced Soviet (mostly Russian) cultural influence in the country which characterized the 1950s was stopped and Western media were allowed to circulate in Romania instead.

==== First years ====
Administrative division of Romania 1950–52 (top) and 1960–68 (bottom)

On 21 August 1965, following the example of Czechoslovakia, the name of the country was changed to "Socialist Republic of Romania" (Republica Socialistă România, RSR) and PMR's old name was restored (Partidul Comunist Român, PCR; "Romanian Communist Party").

In his early years in power, Ceaușescu was genuinely popular, both at home and abroad. Agricultural goods were abundant, consumer goods began to reappear, there was a cultural thaw, and, what was important abroad, he spoke out against the 1968 Soviet invasion of Czechoslovakia. While his reputation at home soon soured, he continued to have uncommonly good relations with Western governments and with international capitalist institutions such as the International Monetary Fund and World Bank because of his independent political line. Romania under Ceaușescu maintained and sometimes improved diplomatic and other relations with, among others, West Germany, Israel, China, Albania, and Pinochet's Chile, all for various reasons not on good terms with Moscow.

Ceaușescu refused to implement measures of economic liberalism. The evolution of his regime followed the path begun by Gheorghiu-Dej. He continued with the program of intensive industrialization aimed at the economic self-sufficiency of the country which since 1959 had already doubled industrial production and had reduced the peasant population from 78% at the end of the 1940s to 61% in 1966 and 49% by 1971. However, for Romania, like other Eastern People's Republics, industrialization did not mean a total social break with the countryside. The peasants returned periodically to the villages or resided in them, commuting daily to the city in a practice called naveta. This allowed Romanians to act as peasants and workers at the same time.

Universities were also founded in small Romanian towns, which served to train qualified professionals, such as engineers, economists, planners or jurists, necessary for the industrialization and development project of the country. Romanian healthcare also achieved improvements and recognition by the World Health Organization (WHO). In May 1969, Marcolino Candau, Director General of this organization, visited Romania and declared that the visits of WHO staff to various Romanian hospital establishments had made an extraordinarily good impression.

The social and economic transformations resulted in improved living conditions for Romanians. Economic growth allowed for higher salaries which, combined with the benefits offered by the state (free medical care, pensions, free universal education at all levels, etc.) were a leap compared to the pre-WWII situation of the Romanian population. Certain extra retributions were allowed for the peasants, who started to produce more.

==== Human rights issues ====
Demographics graphs. A huge surge of the birth rate in 1967, as a result of Decree 770, is the most prominent feature of these graphs.

Concerned about the country's low birthrates, Nicolae Ceaușescu enacted an aggressive natalist policy, which included outlawing abortion and contraception, routine pregnancy tests for women, taxes on childlessness, and legal discrimination against childless people. This period has later been depicted in movies and documentaries (such as 4 Months, 3 Weeks and 2 Days, Children of the Decree). To counter the sharp decline of the population, the Communist Party decided that the Romanian population should be increased from 23 to 30 million inhabitants. In October 1966, Decree 770 was authorized by Ceaușescu.

These pro-natalist measures had some degree of success, as a baby boom resulted in the late 1960s, with the generations born in 1967 and 1968 being the largest in the country's history. The natalist policies temporarily increased birth rates for a few years, but this was followed by a later decline due to an increased use of illegal abortion. Ceaușescu's policy resulted in the deaths of over 9,000 women due to illegal abortions, large numbers of children put into Romanian orphanages by parents who couldn't cope with raising them, street children in the 1990s (when many orphanages were closed and the children ended up on the streets), and overcrowding in homes and schools.

Other restrictions of human rights included invasion of privacy by the secret police (the "Securitate"), censorship and relocation, but not on the same scale as in the 1950s.

During the Ceaușescu era, there was a secret ongoing "trade" between Romania on one side and Israel and West Germany on the other side, under which Israel and West Germany paid money to Romania to allow Romanian citizens with certified Jewish or German ancestry to emigrate to Israel and West Germany, respectively.

==== Industrialization ====
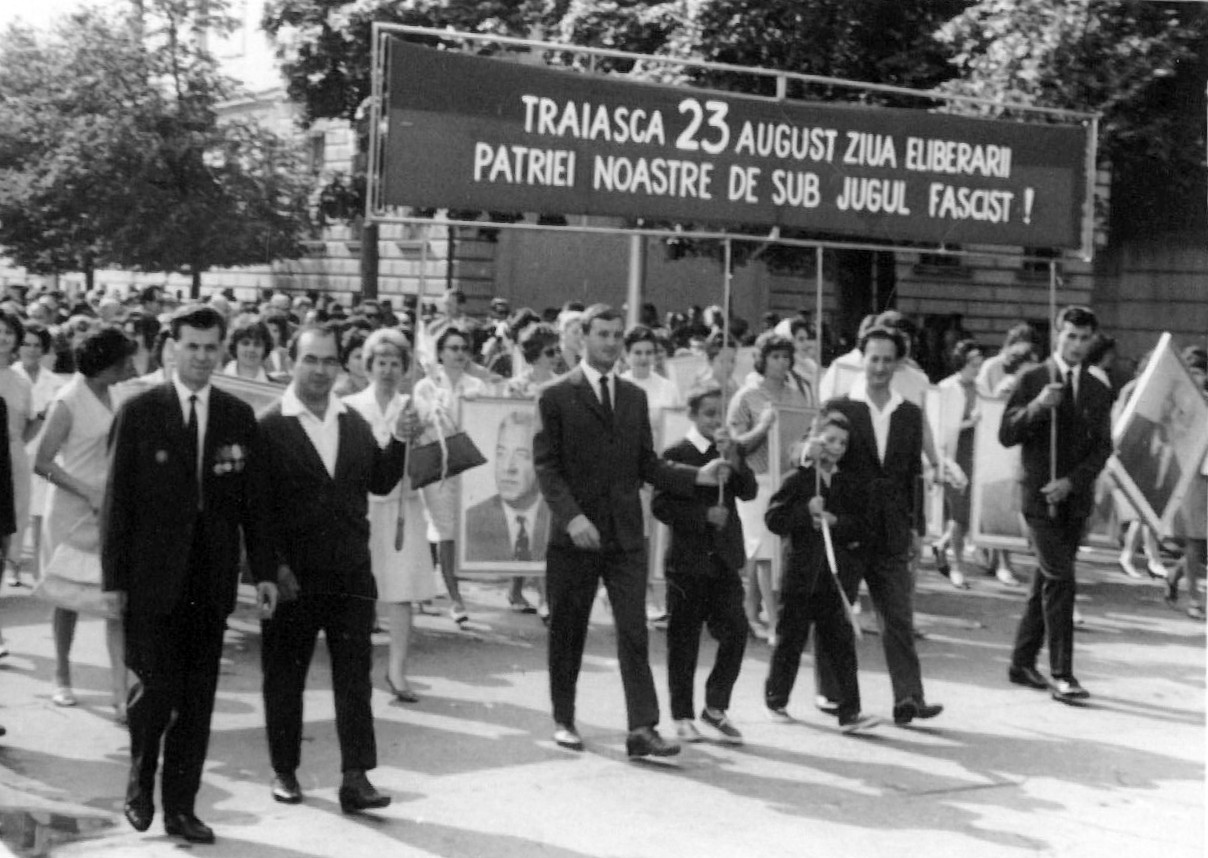
23 August demonstration

Ceaușescu's Romania continued to pursue Gheorghiu-Dej's policy of industrialization. Romania made progress with the economy. From 1951 to 1974, Romania's gross industrial output increased at an average annual rate of 13 percent. Several branches of heavy industry were founded, including the machine-tool, tractor, and automotive industries; large-tonnage shipbuilding; the manufacture of electric diesel locomotives; and the electronics and petrochemical industries.

Prior to the mid-1970s, Bucharest, as most other cities, was developed by expanding the city, especially towards the south, east and west. High density residential neighbourhoods were built on the outskirts of the city, some (such as Drumul Taberei, Berceni, Titan or Giurgiului) of architectural and urban planning value. Conservation plans were made, especially during the 1960s and early 1970s, but all were halted after Ceaușescu embarked on what is known as "The Small Cultural Revolution" ("Mica revoluție culturală"), after visiting North Korea and the People's Republic of China and then delivering a speech known as the July Theses. In the late 1970s, the construction of the Bucharest Metro system was started. After two years, 10 km of network were already complete and after another 2 years, 9 km of tunnels were ready for use. By 17 August 1989, 49.01 km of the subway system and 34 stations were already in use.

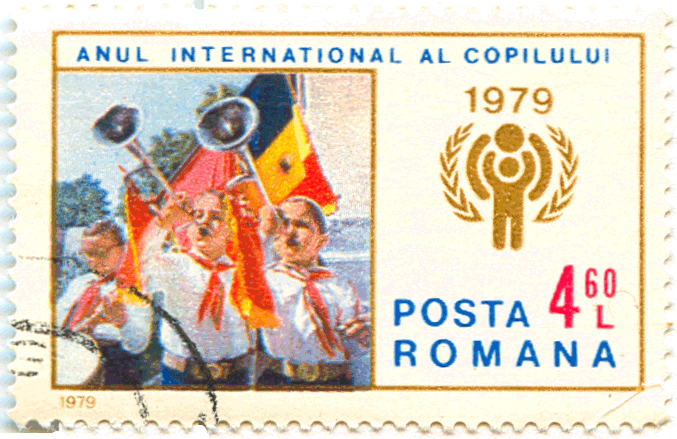
1979 postage stamp

The earthquake of 1977 shocked Bucharest; many buildings collapsed, and many others were weakened. This was the backdrop that led to a policy of large-scale demolition which affected monuments of historical significance or architectural masterpieces such as the monumental Văcărești Monastery (1722), the "Sfânta Vineri" (1645) and "Enei" (1611) Churches, the Cotroceni (1679) and Pantelimon (1750) Monasteries, and the art deco "Republic's Stadium" (ANEF Stadium, 1926). Even the Palace of Justice – built by Romania's foremost architect, Ion Mincu – was scheduled for demolition in early 1990, according to the systematisation papers. Yet another tactic was abandoning and neglecting buildings and bringing them into such a state that they would require being torn down.

Thus, the policy towards the city after the earthquake was not one of reconstruction, but one of demolition and building anew. An analysis by the Union of Architects, commissioned in 1990, claims that over 2000 buildings were torn down, with over 77 of very high architectural importance, most of them in good condition. Even Gara de Nord (the city's main railway station), listed on the Romanian Architectural Heritage List, was scheduled to be torn down and replaced in early 1992.

Despite all of this, and despite the much-questioned treatment of HIV-infected orphans, the country continued to have a notably good system of schools. Also, not every industrialization project was a failure: Ceaușescu left Romania with a reasonably effective system of power generation and transmission, gave Bucharest a functioning subway, and left many cities with an increase in habitable apartment buildings.

==== 1980s: severe rationing ====
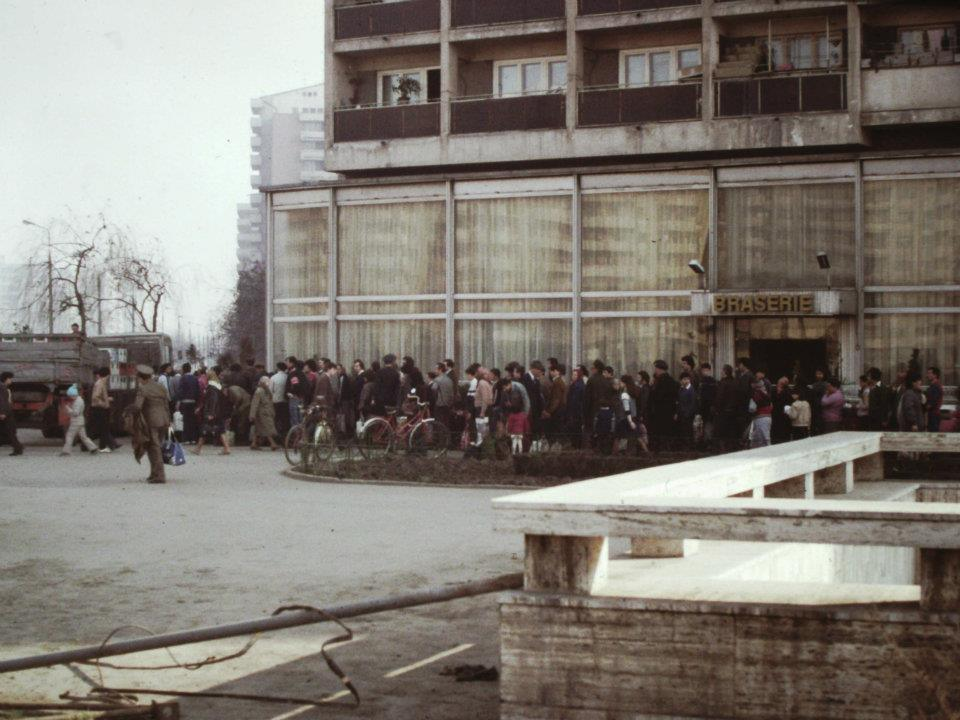
A queue for cooking oil in Bucharest, 1986

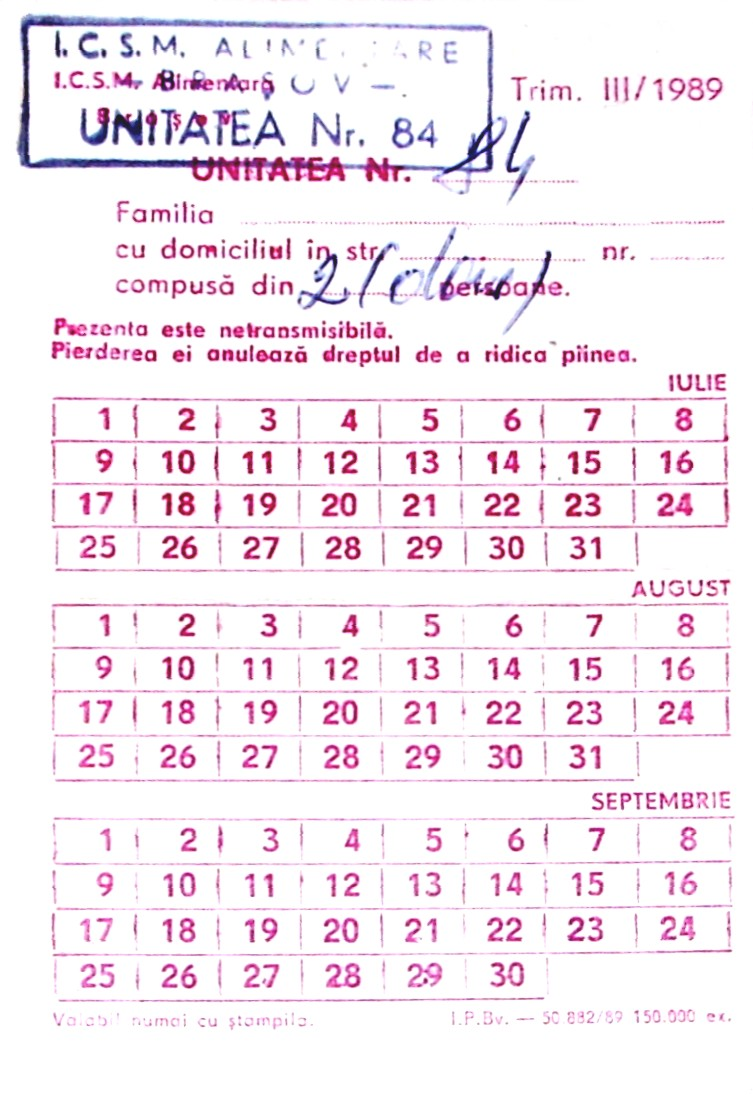
Romanian ration card, 1989

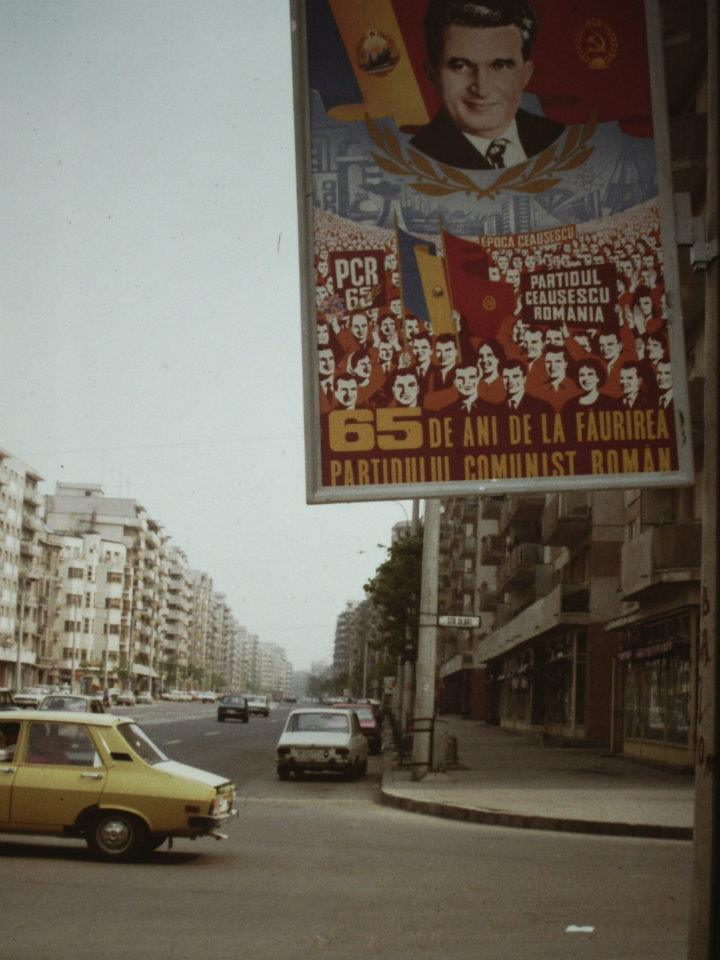
A propaganda poster on the streets of Bucharest, 1986. The caption reads "65 years since the creation of the Romanian Communist Party", while the background states "Ceaușescu Era" and "The Party. Ceaușescu. Romania."

Before austerity, Romania had made considerable progress in many areas. Between 1950 and 1973, Romania joined Yugoslavia and Bulgaria in achieving average annual growth rates that were above both the Central European and the West European average. During the first 3 post-war decades, Romania industrialized faster than Spain, Greece, and Portugal. The infant mortality rate plummeted from 139 per 1,000 during the interwar period to 35 in the 1970s. During the interwar period, half the population was illiterate, but under the communist government illiteracy was eradicated. The population became urbanized, women's rights greatly improved, life expectancy grew, among many other achievements.

Romania continued to make progress. High rates of growth in production created conditions for raising living standards of the people. From 1950 to the mid-1980s, average net wages increased more than eightfold. The consumption fund increased 22-fold, and a broad program of building cultural facilities and housing was carried out. Over 80 percent of the country's population had moved to new apartments during this period.

Despite all this, living standards in the country remained some of Europe's lowest and as early as 1981, there were clear signs of public discontent, such as riots and an angry mob throwing rocks at Ceaușescu's helicopter while it made a flight to Transylvania that October. Ceaușescu desired to repay Western loans, and thus enacted a harsh austerity policy, including rationing of food, gas, heating and electricity. People in cities had to turn to natural gas containers ("butelii") or charcoal stoves, even though they were connected to main gas lines. With full-scale food rationing in place, the Communist Party published official guidelines on how Romanians could eat nutritiously while reducing their calorie intake by 25%. There was a shortage of available goods for the average Romanian. By 1984, despite a high crop yield and increased food production, wide-scale food rationing was introduced. The government promoted it as "rational eating" and "a means to reduce obesity". Most of what was available were export rejects, as most of the quality goods were exported, even underpriced, in order to obtain hard currency, either to pay the debt, or to push forward in the ever-growing pursuit of heavy industrialization.

Measures in the mechanization and chemicalization of farming helped to increase the output of agricultural products. In 1950, more than 300 kg of cereals was gathered per head of the population; by 1982 this amount had increased to 1 ton per person. Meat production increased from 29.5 to 100 kg.

In spite of the Soviet-led boycott, Romania participated in the 1984 Summer Olympics in Los Angeles. At that time, it was the only Soviet-aligned country to participate in the Olympic Games.

In the late 1980s, the United Nations Human Development report classified Romania as having had high human development. The life expectancy was 71 years, the literacy rate was 96%, and the Real GDP per capita was $3000.

By 1985, despite Romania's huge refining capacity, petroleum products were strictly rationed with supplies drastically cut, a Sunday curfew was instated, and many buses used methane propulsion (they were mockingly named "bombs"); taxis were converted to burning methanol. Electricity was rationed to divert supplies to heavy industry, with a maximum monthly allowed consumption of 20 kWh per family (everything over this limit was heavily taxed). Only one in five streetlights was kept on, and television was reduced to a single channel broadcasting just 2 hours each day. All these policies combined led Romanians to have the lowest standard of living in Europe, with the possible exception of Albania.

==== Systematization: demolition and reconstruction ====
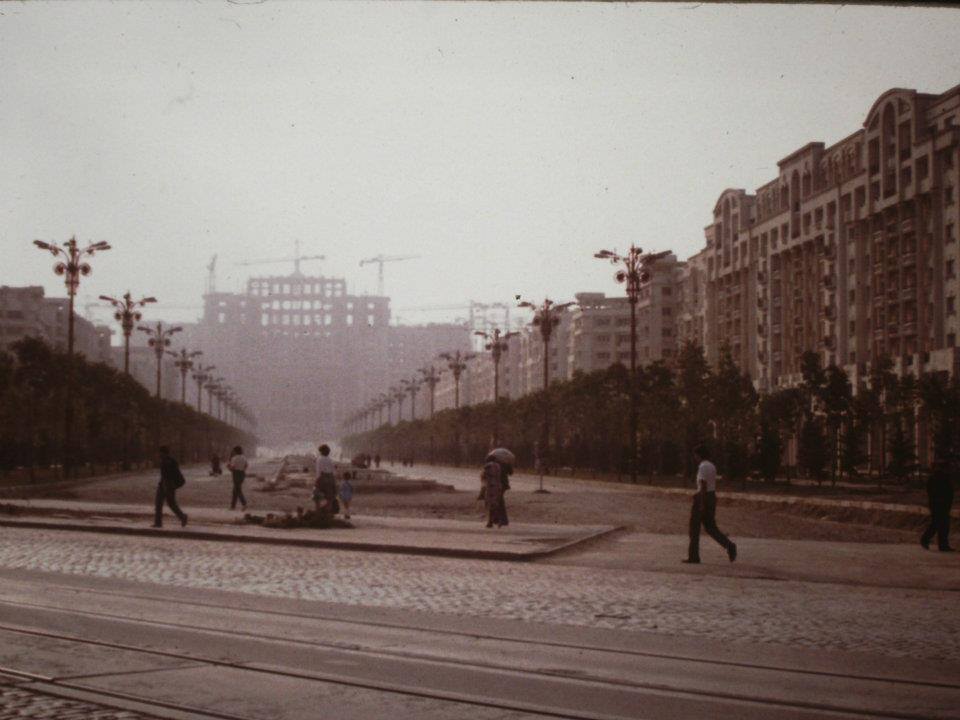
Victory of Socialism Boulevard with House of the Republic building site, Bucharest (1986)

Systematization (Romanian: Sistematizarea) refers to the program of urban planning carried out under Ceaușescu's regime. After a visit to North Korea in 1971, Ceaușescu was impressed by the Juche ideology of that country and began a massive campaign shortly afterwards.

Beginning in 1974, systematization consisted largely of the demolition and reconstruction of existing hamlets, villages, towns, and cities, in whole or in part, with the stated goal of turning Romania into a "multilaterally developed socialist society". The policy largely consisted in the mass construction of high-density blocks of flats (blocuri).

During the 1980s, Ceaușescu became obsessed with building himself a palace of unprecedented proportions, along with an equally grandiose neighborhood, Centrul Civic, to accompany it. The mass demolitions that occurred in the 1980s under which an overall area of eight square kilometres of the historic center of Bucharest were leveled, including monasteries, churches, synagogues, a hospital, and a noted Art Deco sports stadium, in order to make way for the grandiose Centrul Civic (Civic center) and the House of the Republic, now officially renamed the Palace of Parliament, were the most extreme manifestation of the systematization policy.

In 1988 massive rural resettlement program began.

==== Last years: increased social control ====
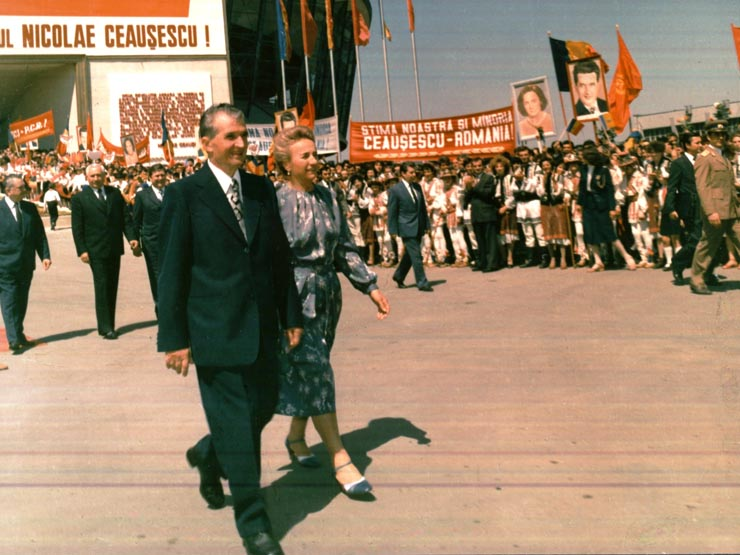
The Communist government fostered the personality cult of Nicolae Ceaușescu and his wife Elena.

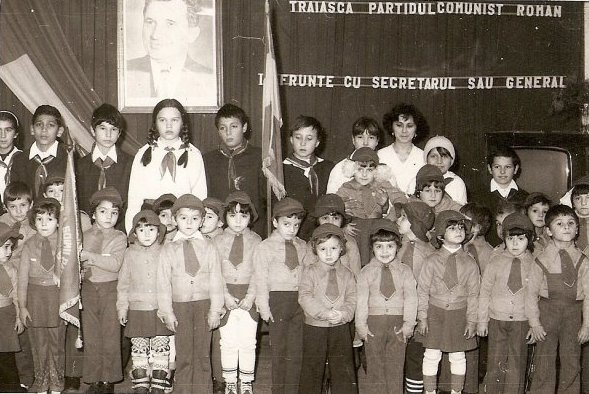
Members of Șoimii Patriei, a communist youth organization created in 1976 for children aged 4–7

Control over society became stricter and stricter, with an East German-style phone bugging system installed, and with the Securitate recruiting more agents, extending censorship and keeping tabs and records on a large segment of the population. By 1989, according to CNSAS (the Council for Studies of the Archives of the Former Securitate), one in three Romanians was an informant for the Securitate. Due to this situation, income from tourism dropped substantially, the number of foreign tourists visiting Romania falling by 75%, with the three main tour operators that organized trips in Romania leaving the country by 1987. Ceaușescu also started becoming the subject of a vast personality cult, his portrait on every street and hanging in every public building.

By 1988, with perestroika and glasnost policies in effect in the Soviet Union and China undergoing the reform and opening up, Romania's Stalinist sociopolitical system began to look increasingly out-of-place, but all attempts were made to keep the populace isolated from events going on outside the country. Also, while the West had been willing in the past to overlook Ceaușescu's human rights record in lieu of his independent, anti-Soviet stance, this was becoming less relevant with the Cold War winding down. As such, Romania started coming under fire from the United States and its allies, but such complaints were merely brushed off as "unwelcome interference in our nation's internal affairs".

There was also a revival of the effort to build:

- the Danube–Black Sea Canal, which was completed;
- a nationwide canal system and irrigation network, some of which was completed, but most of which is still a project, or was abandoned;
- an effort to improve the railway system with electrification and a modern control system;
- the Cernavodă Nuclear Power Plant;
- a national hydroelectric power system, including the Porțile de Fier power station on the Danube in cooperation with Yugoslavia;
- a network of oil refineries;
- a fairly developed oceanic fishing fleet;
- naval shipyards at Constanța;
- a good industrial basis for the chemical and heavy machinery industries;
- a rather well-developed foreign policy; and
- new towns via the Romanian rural systematization program.

=== Downfall ===
==== Brașov Riot ====
December 1989 was the last act of a finale that had started in 1987, in Brașov. The anti-communist riot in Brașov on 15 November 1987 was the main political event that announced the imminent fall of communism in Romania.

The revolt started at the enterprise of Trucks Brașov, as a strike that began on the night of 14 November, on the night shift, and it continued the next morning with a march downtown, in front of the Council of the Romanian Communist Party.

The population heard about this event through Radio Free Europe. As Emil Hurezeanu tells it: "I remember that Neculai Constantin Munteanu, the moderator of the show, started the broadcast: 'Brașov! So Brașov! Now it started!' This was the tone of the whole broadcast. We had interviews, information, interpretations of some political interpretations, older press articles announcing open street protests against Ceaușescu."

The reprisals against the strikers were rapid. The workers were arrested and imprisoned and their families were terrorized, but this act of courage on the part of the workers of Brașov set the stage for future mass revolts.

Hurezeanu continues: "... All these have been turned into an offensive. The reaction of the regime was expected. Very soon it was seen that the regime wants to hide it, to cancel it, practically not to respond to claims, not to take measures, to change anything, not to turn this protest into a public debate or even inside the party, in the Political Executive Committee. And then, the recipe of street confrontations with the regime became the only...possible. It became the leitmotif of all the media analysis. [...] It was the beginning of an action against the system that comprises more items. It was a labor protest in a citadel of Ceaușescu, it was an antidictatorial message, it was a clear political context: the pressures of Moscow, Ceaușescu's refusal to accept the demands of Gorbachev, the breaking with the West, who changed the views towards the regime – all these have made us to believe that the beginning of the end was coming".

==== Protests in 1989 before the Revolution ====
In March 1989, several leading activists of the PCR protested in a letter that criticized the economic policies of Nicolae Ceaușescu, but shortly thereafter Ceaușescu achieved a significant political victory: Romania paid off its external debt of about US$11 billion several months earlier than even the Romanian dictator had expected. Ceaușescu was formally reelected secretary general of the Romanian Communist Party—-the only political party of the Romanian Socialist Republic—-on 14 November at the party's XIVth Congress.

On 11 November 1989, before the party congress, on Bucharest's Brezoianu Street and Kogălniceanu Boulevard, students from Cluj-Napoca and Bucharest demonstrated with placards that read "We want Reforms against the Ceaușescu government." The students–Mihnea Paraschivescu, Grațian Vulpe, the economist Dan Căprariu from Cluj and others–were arrested and investigated by the Securitate at the Rahova Penitentiary, accused of propaganda against the socialist society. They were released on 22 December 1989 at 14.00. There were other letters and other attempts to draw attention to the economic, cultural, and spiritual oppression of Romanians, but they served only to intensify the activity of the communist police and the Securitate.

==== Revolution ====
On 16 December, a protest broke out in Timișoara in response to an attempt by the government to evict the dissident pastor László Tőkés from his church flat. Tőkés had recently made critical comments against the regime to the Hungarian media, and the government alleged that he was inciting ethnic hatred. His parishioners gathered around his home to protect him from harassment and eviction. Many passers-by, including Romanian students, spontaneously joined the protest. Subsequently, police and Securitate forces showed up at the scene. By 7:30 pm, the protest had spread, and the original cause became largely irrelevant. Some of the protesters attempted to burn down the building that housed the District Committee of the Romanian Communist Party (PCR). The Securitate responded with tear gas and water jets, while the police attacked rioters and arrested many of them. Around 9:00 pm, the rioters withdrew. They regrouped eventually around the Romanian Orthodox Cathedral and started a protest march around the city, but again they were confronted by the security forces.

Riots and protests resumed the following day, 17 December. The rioters broke into the District Committee building. The army failed to establish order and chaos ensued, with gunfire, fighting, burning of cars, and casualties.

Unlike the Soviet Union at the same time, Romania had not developed a large, privileged elite. Ceaușescu's family maintained all control of politics and Communist Party officials were paid poorly and often rotated from job to job, thus preventing any potential political rivals from developing a base of support. This prevented the rise of the Gorbachev-era reformist Communism found in Hungary or the Soviet Union. Ceaușescu was so bitterly opposed to reform that he went as far as to call for a Warsaw Pact invasion of Poland after its Communists decided to treat with the opposition–a marked turn from his vehement opposition to the invasion of Czechoslovakia two decades earlier.

Similarly, unlike in Poland, Ceaușescu reacted to strikes entirely through a strategy of further oppression. Romania was nearly the last of the Eastern European communist governments to fall; its fall was also the most violent up to that time.

Protests and riots broke out in Timișoara on 17 December and soldiers opened fire on the protesters, killing about 100 people. After cutting short a two-day trip to Iran, Ceaușescu gave a televised speech on 20 December in which he condemned the events of Timișoara, saying he considered them an act of foreign intervention in the internal affairs of Romania and an aggression through foreign secret services on Romania's sovereignty, and declared National Curfew, convoking a mass meeting in his support in Bucharest for the next day. The uprising of Timișoara became known across the country, and on the morning of 21 December, protests spread to Sibiu, Bucharest and elsewhere.

Matters came to a head on 21 December, when Ceaușescu's speech at the Central Committee Building (CC) in Bucharest turned into chaos. The crowd, in a reaction that would have been unthinkable for most of the previous quarter-century, openly booed and jeered Ceaușescu as he spoke. He was forced to hide himself in the CC Building after losing control of his own "supporters". The night of 21 December brought fighting between protesters and the Securitate, police and part of the army forces; more than 1100 protesters were killed during the fights over the next few days. On the morning of 22 December, it was announced that the army general Vasile Milea was dead by suicide. Believing that Milea had actually been murdered, the rank-and-file soldiers went over almost en masse to the budding rebellion. A second attempt at a speech the next day quickly failed. Soon, people were besieging the Central Committee Building, coming within a few meters of Ceaușescu himself; the Securitate did nothing to help him. Ceaușescu soon fled by helicopter from the rooftop of the CC Building, only to find himself abandoned in Târgoviște, where he and his wife Elena were finally tried by a drumhead court-martial, convicted after an hour and a half, and executed by firing squad moments after the verdict and sentence were announced on 25 December. The PCR dissolved soon afterward and has never been revived.

==== Controversy over the events of December 1989 ====
For several months after the events of December 1989, it was widely argued that Ion Iliescu and the National Salvation Front (FSN) had merely taken advantage of the chaos to stage a coup. While, ultimately, a great deal did change in Romania, it is still a subject of contention among Romanians and other observers as to whether this was their intent from the outset, or merely pragmatic playing of the cards they were dealt. By December 1989 Ceaușescu's harsh and counterproductive economic and political policies had cost him the support of many government officials and even the most loyal Communist Party cadres, most of whom joined forces with the popular revolution or simply refused to support him. This loss of support from government officials ultimately set the stage for Ceaușescu's demise. The Romanian army also was a factor in the regime's fall as it suffered from severe budget cuts while vast sums were spent on the Securitate, leaving them severely discontented and unwilling to save Ceaușescu.

== Politics ==
The Socialist Republic of Romania's political framework was a socialist republic run by a single party, the Romanian Communist Party. All of its legislative meetings took place in Bucharest. It was also a centralised unitary state during the time.

=== Foreign relations ===
Romania's foreign policy was aligned with all nations that were aligned with the Soviet Union. Under Ceaușescu it enjoyed strategic relations with the Western Bloc and the Non-Aligned Movement, and it was the only Eastern Bloc country not to boycott the 1984 Summer Olympics in Los Angeles.

Following the Sino-Soviet split, Romania also maintained relations with China and North Korea as well as the Chinese-backed Khmer Rouge-ruled Democratic Kampuchea.

Romania joined the United Nations on 14 December 1955 (see United Nations Security Council Resolution 109) as well as the International Monetary Fund and the World Bank in 1972. In July 1980, Romania signed a comprehensive trade agreement with the European Economic Community; which in turn became the European Union in 1993 when Romania joined in 2007.

== Legacy ==
Despite the prolonged economic and social crisis between 1982 and 1989 and the following austerity measures; mostly due to the fast and stunning economic growth that was followed by the decline, many Romanians still view the Socialist era of their country positively, looking back nostalgically at an era of perceived stability and safety as opposed to the recent economic and political instability, and also the post-communist corruption that were resilient after 1989, being considered a major problem in the country. More than 53% of Romanians responded in polls that they would prefer to live once again under the Communist regime, and 63% think that their lives were better under it. The last and longest ruling leader of the Communist regime, Ceaușescu, also enjoys a high amount of approval in polls: In 2010, 41% of Romanians would vote for Ceaușescu, by 2014 this percentage reached 46%. In December 2018, 64% of people had a good opinion of Ceaușescu, making him the president with the highest amount of approval in the country.

On the other hand, after the fall of the communist regime, Romania began shifting its political and economic policies from support (albeit tepid) for Moscow to aligning itself with Brussels and Washington by joining NATO in 2004 and the European Union in 2007. Today, the "apologetic presentation" of Nazi and communists governments and denigrating their victims in the audio-visual media is forbidden by decision of the National Audiovisual Council. Dinel Staicu was fined 25,000 lei (approx. 9,000 United States dollars) for praising Ceaușescu and displaying his pictures on his private television channel (3TV Oltenia).

== Gallery ==
Flag (1947–1948)

Flag (1948)

Flag (1948–1952)

Flag (1952–1965)

Flag (1965–1989)
Emblem (1947–1948)

Emblem (1948)

Emblem (1948–1952)

Emblem (1952–1965)

Emblem (1965–1989)

== See also ==
- Administrative divisions of the People's Republic of Romania
- History of Romania since 1989
- List of Romanian communists
- Presidential Commission for the Study of the Communist Dictatorship in Romania
- Romania in World War II
- Scânteia, the Romanian Communist Party's newspaper.
- Systematization (Romania)
- Captive Nations
