= Minuet in G (Paderewski) =

Short piano composition by Ignacy Jan Paderewski

Minuet in G, Op. 14 no 1 performed by Markus Staab

The Minuet in G, Op. 14/1, is a short piano composition by Ignacy Jan Paderewski, which became world-famous, overshadowing his more major works such as the Symphony in B minor "Polonia", the Piano Concerto in A minor, and the opera Manru.

The minuet was written in 1887, the first of six pieces making up his Humoresques de concert, Op. 14. The full set is in two books:

Book I (à l'Antique)

- No. 1: Menuet
- No. 2: Sarabande
- No. 3: Caprice (genre Scarlatti)

Book II (moderne)

- No. 4: Burlesque
- No. 5: Intermezzo polacco
- No. 6: Cracovienne fantastique.

== Recordings ==
In its original form as a solo piano piece, it has received a large number of recordings, from Paderewski himself, to Sergei Rachmaninoff, Josef Hofmann, Ignaz Friedman, Shura Cherkassky, through to the pianists of today such as Roger Woodward, Stephen Hough and Adam Wodnicki.

It has also been arranged for other instruments:

- Fritz Kreisler arranged it for violin and piano, and recorded it with the composer at the piano
- Gaspar Cassadó arranged it for cello and piano.
- The John Philip Sousa band performed a transcription of the piece in Rochester, NY on November 12, 1894.

== Sheet music ==
- Six humoresques de concert, op. 14: Scores at the International Music Score Library Project
