= Minuet =

Social dance and musical form

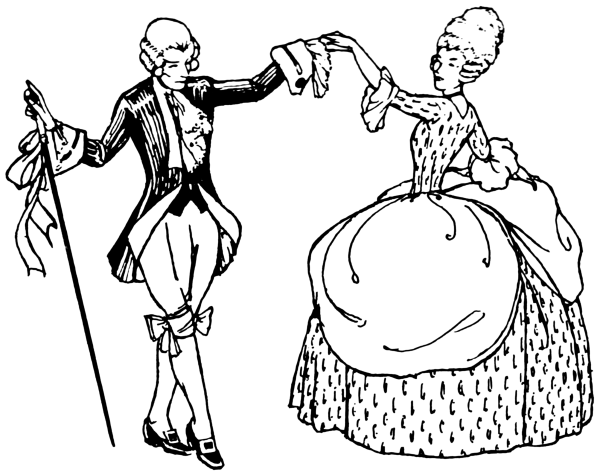
Minuet in the Classical period

A minuet (/ˌmɪnjuˈɛt/; also spelled menuet) is a social dance of French origin for two people, usually written in 3/4 time. The English word was adapted from the Italian minuetto and the French menuet.

The term also describes the musical form that accompanies the dance, which subsequently developed more fully, often with a longer musical form called the minuet and trio, and was much used as a movement in the early classical symphony. While often stylized in instrumental forms, composers of the period would have been familiar with the popular dance.

== Dance ==
The name may refer to the short steps, pas menus, taken in the dance, or else be derived from the branle à mener or amener, popular group dances in early 17th-century France. The minuet was traditionally said to have descended from the bransle de Poitou, though there is no evidence making a clear connection between these two dances. The earliest treatise to mention the possible connection of the name to the expression pas menus is Gottfried Taubert's Rechtschaffener Tantzmeister, published in Leipzig in 1717, but this source does not describe the steps as being particularly small or dainty. At the period when it was most fashionable it was controlled, ceremonious and graceful.

== Music ==
=== Rhythm and form ===
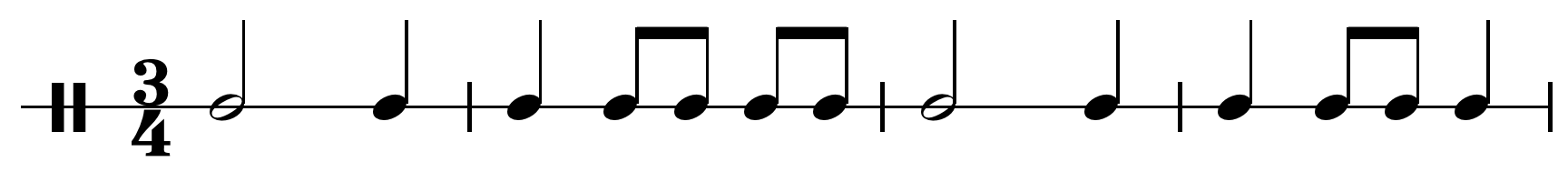
Minuet rhythm

2. Minuet
From Bernhard Romberg's Flute Quintet in G major, Op. 1/3 (1798), James Galway, flute; The Young Danish String Quartet

The name of this dance is also given to a musical composition written in the same time and rhythm, though when not accompanying an actual dance the pace was quicker. Stylistically refined minuets, apart from the social dance context, were introduced—to opera at first—by Jean-Baptiste Lully, who included no fewer than 92 of them in his theatrical works and in the late 17th century the minuet was adopted into the suite, such as some of the suites of Johann Sebastian Bach and George Frideric Handel. Among Italian and some French composers the minuet was often considerably quicker and livelier and was sometimes written in 3/8 or 6/8 time Because the tempo of a minuet was not standard, the tempo direction tempo di minuetto was ambiguous unless qualified by another direction, as it sometimes was.

Initially, before its adoption in contexts other than social dance, the minuet was usually in binary form, with two repeated sections of usually eight bars each. But the second section eventually expanded, resulting in a kind of ternary form. The second (or middle) minuet provided a form of contrast by means of different key (although in many works, the second minuet stayed in the same key as the first minuet), orchestration, and thematic material. On a larger scale, two such minuets might be further combined, so that the first minuet was followed by a second one and then by a repetition of the first. The whole form might in any case be repeated as long as the dance lasted.

==== Minuet and trio ====
Around the time of Jean-Baptiste Lully, it became a common practice to score this middle section for a trio (such as two oboes and a bassoon, as is common in Lully). As a result, this middle section came to be called the minuet's trio, even when no trace of such an orchestration remains. The overall structure is called rounded binary or minuet form:

A	B	A or A′
I (→ V)	V or I(or other closely related)	I

After these developments by Lully, composers occasionally inserted a modified repetition of the first (A) section or a section that contrasted with both the A section and what was thereby rendered the third or C section, yielding the form A–A′–B–A or A–B–C–A, respectively; an example of the latter is the third movement of Mozart's Serenade No. 13 in G major, K. 525, popularly known under the title Eine kleine Nachtmusik.

A livelier form of the minuet simultaneously developed into the scherzo (which was generally also coupled with a trio). This term came into existence approximately from Beethoven onwards, but the form itself can be traced back to Haydn.

The minuet and trio eventually became the standard third movement in the four-movement classical symphony, Johann Stamitz being the first to employ it thus with regularity.

An example of the true form of the minuet is to be found in Don Giovanni.

A famous example of a more recent instrumental work in minuet form is Ignacy Jan Paderewski's Minuet in G.

== See also ==
- Scherzo, a musical form derived from the minuet
