= Max Fiedler =

German conductor and composer

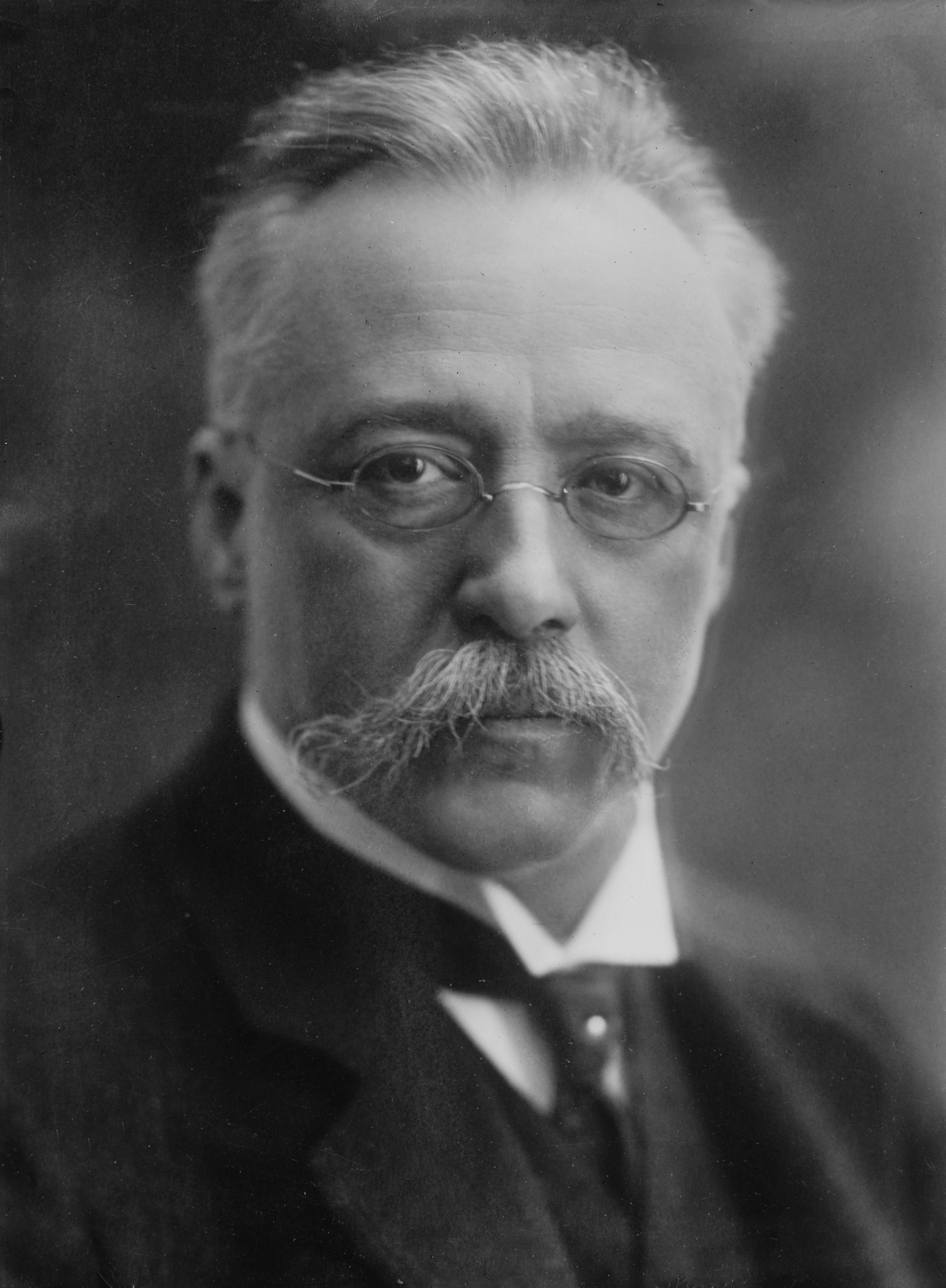
Max Fiedler

August Max Fiedler (21 December 1859, Zittau – 1 December 1939, Stockholm) was a German conductor and composer, He was noted as an interpreter of Brahms.

He first studied the piano with his father, who conducted the accompanying orchestra when Max made his first public appearance at the age of ten in 1870, playing Mozart's Piano Concerto in A, K.488. Continuing his musical studies in Zittau with the organist Gustav Albrecht, who had been a pupil of Mendelssohn, Fiedler then entered the Leipzig Conservatory in 1877, where the director, Carl Reinecke, was his piano teacher. He graduated in 1882, with exceptional honours, alongside his friend and colleague Karl Muck. Fiedler also studied composition and was active in the city's musical life, developing a close relationship with Julius Spengel, a friend of Brahms.

Fiedler himself knew Brahms sufficiently well for the composer to ask him to substitute for him in a performance of his Piano Concerto No. 2, an invitation which Fiedler politely declined. He almost certainly heard Brahms conduct the first Leipzig performances of his Symphony No. 2 early in 1878 (though Ethel Smyth later wrote that Brahms "had the knack of rubbing orchestras the wrong way... Moreover, the Gewandhaus musicians were antagonistic to his music") and his Violin Concerto on New Year's Day, 1879, with the dedicatee, Joseph Joachim, as soloist, though Jan Swafford writes that it "turned out a scrambling affair, with Joachim unnerved by all the last-minute revisions and Brahms even more tense on the podium than usual." As a young man he conducted Brahms' symphonies in the presence of the composer who, not given to reticence when expressing himself, does not appear to have complained of Fiedler's interpretations.

Having found work teaching at the Hamburg Conservatory Fiedler was soon much in demand as a pianist, winning high praise for his 'soft tone'. His first appearance on the conductor's podium came during the 1885–1886 season in a performance of his own composition (a symphony), and his first complete concert in late 1886. Encouraged to persevere by his first wife, he soon became one of the most popular conductors active in Hamburg, alongside Hans von Bülow, whose musicianship he admired and whose baton technique he adopted. While it was not to be until 1903 that he took over the direction of the Hamburg Conservatory, and 1904 that of the Hamburg Philharmonic Orchestra, from 1898 onwards Fiedler was active abroad as a guest conductor, appearing in Russia, where he was compared to Artur Nikisch and Felix Weingartner, Madrid (1899), Paris (1901), Turin (1904), Rome (1906, 1908) and London (1907, 1908). Throughout this period he developed a reputation as a major interpreter of the music of Brahms, as well as a conductor with 'complete mastery' of the orchestra.

In 1908, Karl Muck, then the conductor of the Boston Symphony Orchestra, recommended Fiedler as his successor as conductor of the orchestra, and he was duly appointed, having already appeared in the United States during 1905, when he had conducted the New York Philharmonic Orchestra alongside Willem Mengelberg and a year before the guest appearance of a German conductor noted for his Brahms, Fritz Steinbach. Although he spent four years at the helm in Boston, his conducting attracted some criticism, especially for his volatility as an interpreter, which was viewed as pleasing 'the general public' rather than 'connoisseurs'. Among his achievements there, he conducted the world premiere of Paderewski's massive Symphony in B minor "Polonia" in 1909.

Fiedler returned to Hamburg in 1912, where Siegmund von Hausegger was now in charge of the Philharmonic Orchestra; and since co-residence was likely to be difficult, given his own status as a former conductor of this orchestra, Fiedler withdrew to Berlin, where he became an active guest conductor of the city's various orchestras. In 1916 a Berlin critic hailed him as 'the greatest Brahms conductor of the present day', and during the same year he accepted the position of conductor of the Essen Orchestra, in succession to Hermann Abendroth, who was moving to Cologne to replace Steinbach.

At Essen, Fiedler consolidated his reputation as a major figure in German musical life, conducting a wide repertoire that included contemporary composers such as Walter Braunfels, Karol Szymanowski and Arthur Honegger, as well as each year organising a festival devoted to a major single composer. In addition he guest-conducted the Berlin Philharmonic Orchestra occasionally, and from 1927 was co-conductor of the Essen Folkwangschule. In 1929 he married for the second time and in 1934 gave up his position in Essen, returning once more to Berlin where he conducted the Berlin Radio Orchestra, as well as that of Hamburg. During 1939 he made a series of farewell appearances in Berlin and Essen, but towards the end of the year he became fatally ill, dying in Stockholm, Sweden just a few weeks short of his eightieth birthday.

== Legacy ==
Fiedler made several commercial recordings, all of music by Brahms, apart from two overtures by Weber. He recorded the Academic Festival Overture, Symphony No. 2, two movements from the Piano Concerto No. 2 and the Symphony No. 4 with the Berlin Philharmonic Orchestra. In addition a number of his later radio performances have been preserved: these include accounts of Brahms' Violin Concerto and Schumann's Symphony No. 1 from Berlin. Because of his contemporary stature as an interpreter of Brahms and his direct contact with the composer, it is easy to consider Fiedler's performances of Brahms as being in some way 'authentic'. However, the English writer Christopher Dyment has written that, while Fiedler was a conductor who ‘... most fully explored every facet of Brahms’s emotional world’, nevertheless his performances, because of their constant shifts of tempo and mannered phrasing—for instance the frequent introduction of unwritten luftpausen—reflected an interpretative model that owed far more to von Bülow than to Brahms. Dyment concluded that in Fiedler's recording of the Symphony No. 4, for instance, '…Brahms's demands for flexibility are here supplied in over-abundance.' On the other hand, it is known that Brahms conducted his music with occasional unwritten tempo changes. Nonetheless, even if Fiedler's recordings do represent a highly individualised interpretative approach, they still allow a fascinating glimpse into a world of musical performance only imperfectly chronicled, for historical reasons, by the gramophone.

Fiedler's own compositions include a symphony, overture, piano quintet, string quartet, and piano pieces and songs.

Max Fiedler is not related to Arthur Fiedler, long-time conductor of the Boston Pops Orchestra and violinist in the Boston Symphony.

Max had a son named Max George Fiedler (1898–1977). Max George Fiedler came to the US around 1925. From 1930 on, he was engaged in advanced diesel engine research in the hopes of building a cleaner, quieter, and lighter automotive diesel engine. He gave a paper entitled, "A New Theory of Diesel Combustion" in 1939, the year his father died, at the Franklin Institute in Philadelphia, Pennsylvania. A paper discussing Fiedler's work and putting it into a modern context by Baxter and Hiltner was published by ASME in 2001.
