= Polonia (Elgar) =

Edward Elgar in 1917

Polonia is a symphonic prelude by the English composer Edward Elgar written in 1915 as his Op. 76.

== History ==
On 13 April 1915 the Polish conductor Emil Młynarski asked Elgar to compose something, thinking of how Elgar's Carillon had been a recent tribute to Belgium, but this time using Polish national music.

The piece was mainly Elgar's own work, but he included quotations from the Polish National Anthem Mazurek Dąbrowskiego, the Warszawianka and other Polish patriotic songs, and themes by Chopin and Paderewski.

It was first performed at the Polish Victims' Relief Fund Concert in the Queen's Hall, London on 6 July 1915, with the orchestra conducted by the composer. The Relief Fund was a worldwide effort, organised by Paderewski and Henryk Sienkiewicz, in aid of refugees from the terrible conflict in Poland between the forces of Russia and Germany. There were elaborately engraved programmes, each tied with a red and white ribbon, containing messages from Paderewski. Elgar conducted his première and Thomas Beecham conducted the remainder of the concert.

Elgar dedicated Polonia to Paderewski, already a distinguished pianist and composer. Paderewski had written his own "Polonia" in 1908, his Symphony in B minor, to which he had given that subtitle.

=== Elgar's correspondence with Paderewski ===
On 29 August 1915, Elgar wrote to Paderewski, asking for permission for the quotation from his Fantasie Polonaise to be published:

Elgar's letter to Paderewski, page 1

My dear Friend,

I hope you are well & that your great work is progressing as you wish: you have our deepest sympathy & the greatest hopes for the future.

For the Polish Concert in July I composed an orchestra piece 'Polonia' as a small personal tribute to you; founded upon some Polish themes the work had success: in the middle section I have brought in remote & I trust with poetic effect a theme of Chopin & with it a theme of your own from the Polish Fantasia linking the two greatest names in Polish music – Chopin & Paderewski. I hope that you will one day hear the piece &, it may be, approve.

My publisher asks me to bring the passage to your notice

[Here Elgar wrote out the opening two bars of Paderewski's theme] ...etc. about 16 bars

& to ask you if you will give permission for the theme to be quoted when the score is printed: we are very anxious to know that you will not object to this & shall be glad of a reply as early as you can conveniently find.

We are in great hopes that you will return to England soon & be assured that the warmest welcome is for you.

With love and reverence, Your friend, Edward Elgar

P.S. I wished to quote a theme from you and the one chosen was suggested by our friend Mrs. C. Stuart Wortley – whose choice can never be wrong.

Paderewski received the work with genuine admiration. He wrote to Elgar after hearing the work for a second time in October:

I heard your noble composition, my beloved Polonia, on two different occasions: deeply touched by the graciousness of your friendly thought, and profoundly moved by the exquisite beauty of your work, I write you a letter of sincere and affectionate appreciation.

== Themes ==
Elgar quotes Polish patriotic songs, the Polish National Anthem, and themes by Chopin and Paderewski, integrating with them a theme of his own, said to be the motive of his admiration for the Polish people.

The first theme that Elgar uses is heard, after an introductory flourish, played by the bassoons. It is a quote from the Warszawianka, which has the words "Śmiało podnieśmy sztandar nasz w górę" ("Bravely let us raise our flag"). This is immediately followed by a Nobilmente theme (Elgar's own), broadly stated then dying away to lead to the second national theme which is the dignified "Chorał" or "Z dymem pożarów" ("With the smoke of fires"), first played simply by the cellos (with a cor anglais) and a harp, later by the woodwind with a violin countermelody, before being played by the full orchestra. The Warszawianka theme is then developed, leading into a brief return of Elgar's theme, before a quotation from Paderewski's Fantasie Polonaise appears, signalled by the ring of a triangle. The magical section following quotes from Chopin's Nocturne in G minor, played by a solo violin, during which the Paderewski theme is heard, and is quietly interrupted by the Warszawianka. There is further development which leads to a triumphant return of the Chorale, which sounds like a conclusion to the work, but no: the Chorale dies away, there is a simple statement of the Polish National Anthem "Jeszcze Polska nie zginęła" ("Poland Is Not Yet Lost"), and it is this Anthem which brings the work to a brilliantly orchestrated conclusion. For the final bars, the instruments of the orchestra are joined by the organ.

A thorough appreciation and analysis of the work has been made by American-born Polish musician Joseph A. Herter.

== Recordings ==
- The Symphony Orchestra conducted by Sir Edward Elgar, recorded 22 May 1919, issued on His Master's Voice D493 [matrix HO3726af & HO3728af]; reissued in "The Elgar Edition. The Acoustic HMV Recordings," 1914–25. Pearl CD GEMMCDS9951/5.
- 1975 "Elgar Orchestral Music", London Philharmonic Orchestra conducted by Sir Adrian Boult, includes "Polonia". EMI Records, ASD 3050 stereo.
- Elgar Collector's Edition Modern edition of the same recording – London Philharmonic Orchestra, Sir Adrian Boult.
- Elgar War Music Rutland Sinfonia, Barry Collett.
- British Symphonic Collection Vol 2: Elgar Munich Symphony Orchestra, Douglas Bostock.
- Elgar: Marches New Zealand Symphony Orchestra, James Judd.
- Transcribed for organ played by Simon Nieminski at St Mary's Episcopal Cathedral, Edinburgh.
- Elgar: Violin Concerto (Violin Concerto/ Polonia/ Interlude From The Crown Of India) played by the Royal Scottish National Orchestra conducted by Sir Andrew Davis.
