= United States of Poland =

Proposed country in 1917

United States of Poland based on Paderewski's concept

United States of Poland (Polish: Stany Zjednoczone Polski) was an unrealized political concept of reborn Poland, created by Ignacy Jan Paderewski (1860–1941). It was first presented in the Paderewski Memorandum, given to US President Woodrow Wilson on 11 January 1917.

Paderewski's idea postulated rebuilding a Polish state as a federation, where equality of all citizens, regardless of religion and ethnicity, would be enshrined in law and the states constitution. The proposed state would include most of the former lands of the Polish Lithuanian Commonwealth. Taking into account the population of the regions within the proposed nation's borders, the country would have 54 million citizens. At its head would be a President with a title of the King of Poland, Lithuania, Polesia and Halych.

== Administrative regions ==
United States of Poland were to be a number of autonomous states including:

- Kingdom of Poland
- Kingdom of Lithuania
- Kingdom of Polesia
- Kingdom of Galicia-Podolia
- Kingdom of Volhynia

Later the concept of Galicia-Podolia was supplanted by the Kingdom of Halych. In a separate memorandum there was also the proposal of incorporating Eastern Prussia into it.

=== Ukrainian problem ===
The proposed creation of 2 kingdoms in the lands inhabited by large numbers of Ukrainians did not satisfy their interests in the creation of an independent state. Paderewski did not pursue the matter further due to the large percentage of Ukrainians living in those regions with a different politics and demography.
