= Helena Paderewska =

Polish social activist (1856–1934)

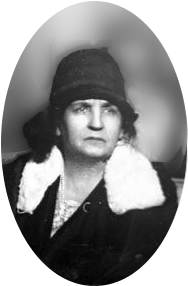
- Helena Paderewska circa 1929
- Born: Helena Maria von Rosen; August 1, 1856; Warsaw, Congress Poland, Russian Empire
- Died: January 16, 1934 (aged 77); Riond-Bosson, Switzerland
- Spouse(s): Władysław Górski; Ignacy Jan Paderewski
- Children: Wacław Otton Górski; Maria Górska; Alfred Paderewski (stepson)
- Parent(s): Wladislaw Friedrich Johann Kasimir von Rosen; Zofia Taube
- Awards: Pontifical cross

Helena Maria Paderewska (née von Rosen; previously Górska) (August 1, 1856 – January 16, 1934) was a Polish social activist who helped found the Polish White Cross society during World War I (among other humanitarian activities), and also is known as the second wife and partial biographer of Polish patriot, prime minister and musician Ignacy Jan Paderewski.

== Early and family life ==
Born in Warsaw in 1856 to an aristocratic Polish father of Baltic German descent (Baron Władysław Friedrich Johann Kasimir von Rosen, b. 1829) and a Greek mother. Her father met her mother during the Crimean War. Her mother died shortly after Helena's birth. Władysław remarried and left Helena in the care of his mother and his sister.

At the time, Warsaw was part of Russian Empire, with the Russian Tsar also the Polish King since the 1815 treaty ending the Napoleonic Wars, which also contained a provision suppressing the name "Poland" (one of Napoleon's allies having been the Duchy of Warsaw). Polish identity and culture had been forced into dissident channels, particularly in Russian- (and after 1871 also Prussian-) administered areas. (The last Polish-Lithuanian King, Augustus III of Poland, had died in 1763 and the resulting Commonwealth government had launched Europe's first secular school system a decade later, as the big-power partitions which led to the Polish state's dismemberment began). She had an elder brother, possibly the father of Robert Otto von Rosen (b. 1879). Her father remarried and Helena von Rosen was raised by her paternal grandmother, Katarzyna (Rucinska) von Rosen, and her aunt Emilia Leokadia (von Rosen) Jaszowska. She became fluent in four languages (especially French) but received little formal education. At age 17, she married Władysław Górski (1846–1915), then a decade her senior and a violin soloist with the Warsaw Opera orchestra. Their son, Wacław Otton Górski (1877–1936) would move to the United States, become a journalist, marry twice, and would be buried in Indianapolis. They also had a daughter, Maria Górska. However, marital issues which began the year after their son's birth caused their separation.

Divorce not being recognized by the Catholic church, von Rosen lived for years with Ignacy Jan Paderewski, her future second husband and a widower since his first wife Antonina Korsak had died of complications following the birth of their severely disabled son Alfred (1880–1901). Helena and Ignacy had first met circa 1878, when Paderewski was a rising young pianist near her age who played concerts with her husband. Their friendship eventually grew into a romance. Beginning in 1895, Rosen attempted to annul her first marriage with Górski, on grounds that her father had not given the necessary consent to the marriage (since she was then a minor) and that the marriage ceremony had occurred in a parish to which neither spouse belonged. Shortly after receiving the annulment, Helena and Ignacy married in Warsaw on May 31, 1899.

== Social activist ==
Shortly after their marriage, Paderewski bought a villa, Riond-Bosson, near Morges, Switzerland, where he recovered from his worldwide concert tours, and they both experimented with new farming and husbandry techniques. She raised prize-winning purebred chickens at Riond-Bosson and donated 300 for breeding by the Warsaw Agricultural Society, as well as founded an agricultural school to teach Polish country girls poultry farming and gardening techniques in Julin in northeast Poland. Paderewski also owned a large estate in Galicia and a property near Nyon on the shores of Lake Geneva, and circa 1913 bought two ranches near Paso Robles, California, where they spent summers in a nearby hotel, as well as cultivated walnuts, almonds and plums (processed into prunes).

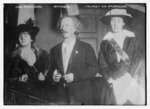
Mr and Mrs Paderewski at Philadelphia Emergency Aid Benefit 1916

By 1910, Paderewski was wealthy and famous both as a philanthropist and musician. He had embraced the new phonograph and sound recording technologies (like the opera star Enrico Caruso and the violinist Fritz Kreisler), as well as performed at concerts throughout Europe, the United States, Australia, South America and South Africa. While he met with the powerful and courted wealthy donors for various charities they supported (some by specific concerts), Paderewska wrote letters and appeals, met with grassroots workers and parish priests, and handled marketing and money. Among her projects was a club for Warsaw's newspaper boys, and a home for elderly female veterans (including of the failed January Uprising of 1863 against Russia and the Revolution in the Kingdom of Poland (1905-1907)).

Her husband, Paderewski, also became involved in Polish affairs. Noting that Russia forbade erection of a statue to the national poet Adam Mickiewicz on the 100th anniversary of his birth, Paderewski refused invitations to perform in Moscow and St. Petersburg. After Prussia forbade the proposed erection of a statue honoring the Polish and Lithuanian warriors who won the Battle of Grunwald against the Teutonic Knights 500 years earlier (which Paderewski said he dreamed about since he was 14 years old), Paderewski proudly refused multiple invitations to perform again in Berlin. Paderewski also substantially funded both monuments, which the Austro-Hungarian Empire permitted in Kraków, Poland's historic capital. In erecting these monuments, Paderewski became associated with Roman Dmowski, president of the Polish Club of Petrograd and leader of the Polish members of the Russian Duma, but whose anti-Semitism would later become an issue used against Paderewski in the United States.

As World War I's hostilities began in late July 1914, the Paderewskis were celebrating his name day and her birthday with their customary gathering of friends, musicians and politicians at their Swiss home. Their funds (and especially those of their Polish friends) were frozen in Lausanne (although they managed to live on credit), and travel became difficult. They hosted about 50 people for several weeks, and Lausanne became a gathering place for Polish exiles. In November 1914, Russian Grand Duke Nicholas reportedly promised Polish independence after the war, but Paderewski feared it a ruse to quiet rampant unrest, and began working with Erasmus Piltz, Henry Sienkiewicz, Wincenty Lutosławski, Józef Wierusz-Kowalski, Jan Kucharzewski and other Polish exiles for Polish relief.

In January 1915, Paderewski planned a three-month trip to Paris, London and the United States, initially thinking he and his wife could lobby for Polish relief, as well as continue his concert career. However, they soon realized the difficulty of the task they had undertaken. Russia's ambassador in Paris, Count Alexander Izvolsky, was anti-Polish, though a politically necessary member of any relief committee of Polish exiles in that country. Meanwhile, Paderewska through contacts with Mildred Barnes Bliss, Denys Cochin and Wladyslaw Mickiewicz was able to visit Polish conscript prisoners from the German army, as well as start a doll-making project among nearly destitute Polish students and artisans in Paris. For the next several years, she hauled trunks of dolls and sold them in conjunction with her husband's concerts to develop profits to buy milk for Polish babies and do other good works. In London, Russia's ambassador Count Alexander Benckendorff assisted Paderewski's Polish relief efforts both in Britain and its overseas colonies. However, the English public knew little about Poland, so Paderewski began writing letters to newspaper editors, which some published. Thus began his role as Polish spokesman. In April 1915, the Paderewskis boarded the transatlantic steamship Adriatic for the United States, but the sinking of the Lusitania the following month transformed their short trip into one of more than three years.

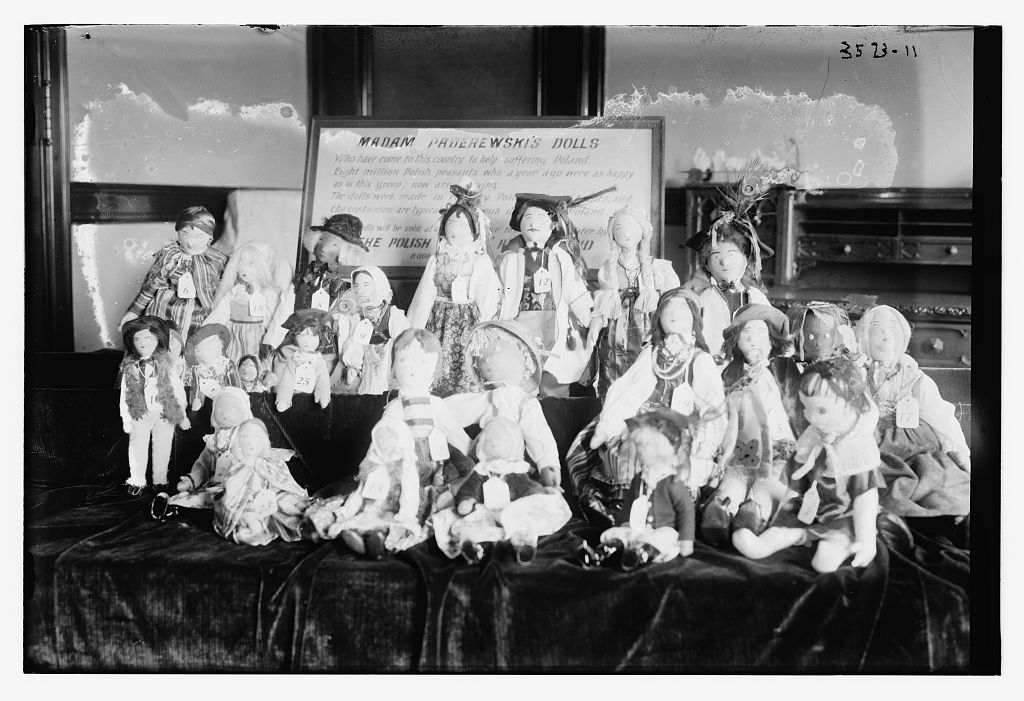
Dolls made by WW1 Polish refugees in France for sale through Helena Paderewska

In the United States, the Paderewskis made a hotel in New York City their base, but spent possibly more nights aboard overnight railway cars, not only traveling for benefit performances (during which she sold dolls as well as signed autographs), but also to meet the Polish community in the United States (and get them to overcome their various hostilities to Prussia or Russia or loyalty to the broken Austro-Hungarian Empire). Paderewski advocated Poland's cause before his concerts, and also used his fame to meet key politicians and influencers, thus becoming a key spokesman in exile for Poland. He developed a relationship with Col. Edward M. House, who became a key aide of President Woodrow Wilson, and also became acquainted with future President Herbert Hoover (who initially worked to evacuate Americans trapped by the conflict and later coordinated aid in Europe). Wilson endorsed the idea of an independent Polish state immediately before his election in 1916, and chose not to block (and eventually endorsed) Paderewski's idea of an army of Polish exiles, initially proposed as Kosciuszko's Army, and later called the Blue Army or Haller's Army, which France endorsed and Canada permitted to train. The Paderewskis made many trips to Chicago (the headquarters of several Polish organizations) and in August 1918 a thousand Polish emigrant delegates from North American (of all political persuasions) met in Detroit and agreed to raise ten million dollars to benefit Poland. However, by September 1917, the press of Polish affairs forced Paderewski to stop further concerts.

During their three years of travels in the United States, Canada and the Caribbean, Helena Paderewska organized help for the war's victims in Poland, as well as for Polish soldiers, who first fought in France and later on the Eastern Front. With the help of Polish emigrants in the United States, Paderewska founded the Polish White Cross in February 1918 (initially the Red Cross would not permit use of its name since Poland was not a country), and also helped found the Relief Society for Intelligence.

== First lady ==
Poland briefly regained its independence as the war ended on November 11, 1918, in what became known as the Second Polish Republic. As transatlantic crossings again became safe, the couple steamed to London, where (after overcoming lodging problems) the British Foreign Office asked Paderewski go to Warsaw and help establish a stable government, necessary if Poland were to have representatives at the upcoming peace conference. After brief consultations with Mr. Dmowski in Paris (where the Peace Conference would begin), the Paderewskis and Major Iwanowski (Paderewski's secretary) embarked on a British cruiser, escorted by a destroyer, for Gdańsk. After a snowstorm delay, they reached Poland on Christmas Day. Enthusiastic crowds greeted the Paderewskis in Gdańsk and again in Posnan after a train trip the following day, although retreating Prussian authorities had opposed Paderewski's stops in either city. Moreover, Paderewski had caught a cold during the stormy sea voyage, so Paderewska took his place on the reviewing stand for the children's parade, only to learn that some Prussian soldiers were firing upon Poles elsewhere in the city. Paderewski survived an assassination attempt (bullets shot into their hotel room) before they left for Kalisz (destroyed by Prussia early in the war). Travel proved slow as Polish soldiers cleared the rail line to Warsaw, plus in every village en route people greeted them with flowers, bread and salt. Despite arriving at Warsaw at 1a.m., a crowd of peasants wearing national costumes unyoked the carriage's horses in order to pull the Paderewskis the mile to their hotel through another massive crowd.

However the political situation remained chaotic, and not only because the country had been devastated by years of war. Many people lacked food, as well as boots and proper winter clothing. Despite speedy diplomatic recognition from the United States, Poland faced border disputes, particularly in Silesia with the Czechs. Russian Bolsheviks continued to fight in the north and east, and Ukrainian Nationalists besieged Lwow/Lemberg. On January 5–6, a bloodless failed coup led the unpopular leftist Jędrzej Moraczewski government to resign, though Józef Piłsudski remained Poland's temporary chief of state. Furthermore, personal threats against Paderewski by radical elements greatly worried Paderewska, though her husband responded "there is no place in politics for a man who is afraid of death."

From January 16 to December 9, 1919, Paderewski became the Second Republic's Prime Minister (technically president of the Council of Ministers), and Foreign Minister as well for a slightly longer time. In Poland's first elections, he had been elected from Warsaw and Lublin, and accepted the former seat. Helena Paderewska accompanied him during many of these meetings, and government business was conducted at their hotel homes. She also influenced her husband's policy, and that involvement became a focus for criticism by some afraid to attack her husband directly (somewhat akin to the later Eleanor Roosevelt). During their seven months in Paris, Paderewska became one of the few women present at the signing of the Treaty of Versailles in June 1919 (her husband being Poland's signatory) and also witnessed the signing of the Treaty of St. Germain (which formally ended hostilities with the Austro-Hungarian empire) in September before they returned to Warsaw. However, Paderewski resigned his positions in December, his health having failed after further elections failed to produce a majority government. They returned to their Swiss home, where Paderewska wrote her memoirs of the previous decade with the assistance of native English speakers.

The following year (1920), Paderewski briefly represented Poland at the League of Nations in New York, while war continued with Russia and Ukraine, and the Red Army nearly captured Warsaw. However, the World War had also destroyed Paderewski's fortune, so he resigned that position in 1921, resumed his musical concerts in 1922, and world tours beginning in 1924. In 1924, the year of his last personal visit to Poland, Paderewski also sold his interest in the Warsaw daily newspaper Rzeczpospolita and ended his political career.

On January 18, 1919, all organizations working on Polish soil that followed the ideals of the International Red Cross and Red Crescent Movement gathered, and soon amalgamated as the Polish Red Cross Society. Paderewska had participated as leader of the Polish White Cross. The Polish government soon approved the new entity, and a few months later - after the aristocratic first president Paweł Sapieha (1860–1934) resigned - Paderewska became the relatively new society's president. She continued in the position until 1926, although she last visited Poland in 1924. Paderewska also supported the Polish YWCA, and was an honorary member of Polish Women's Alliance of America.

In 1921 Pope Benedict XV awarded Paderewska the pontifical cross for her humanitarian work.

== Death and legacy ==
During the final two years of her life, Helena Paderewska suffered several illnesses. Her husband, Ignacy Paderewski, canceled his winter tour of the United States in order to comfort her in her final days. Helena Paderewska died in Switzerland on January 16, 1934, at the Paderewski estate Riond-Bosson in Tolochenaz near Morges. Her husband buried her at Cimetière des Champeaux in Montmorency, Val-d'Oise near Paris next to his Alfred (1880–1901). Deeply affected by her death, Paderewski made known his wish to be buried beside her. However, he survived her by about seven years, during which time he continued to advocate for Polish independence and indicated that he wanted to be buried in Poland once it again became free, which later happened, so his remains never have been buried beside her.

In 2014, the Hoover Institution announced that curator Maciej Siekierski had discovered two copies of an unpublished typescript by Paderewska which contained a political biography of her husband during the years 1910–1920. Paderewski had entrusted it to fellow musician and U.S. military intelligence officer Ernest Schelling, who never published it, although following Siekierski's editing, it was published in 2015.

== Bibliography ==
- Helena Paderewska. Obituary. Kurier Warszawski, p. 7, No. 17 (January 18, 1934)
- Fr. Zygmunt Kaczyński, Ś. Helena Paderewska, Kurier Warszawski, p. 10-11, No. 17 (January 18, 1934)
