= Manru =

Ignacy Jan Paderewski in 1900

Manru is an opera (lyrical drama) in three acts, music by Ignacy Jan Paderewski composed to the libretto by Alfred Nossig based on the novel A Hut Behind the Village (1854) by Józef Ignacy Kraszewski.

The libretto was written in German to meet a commission from the Dresden Opera, where it was premiered on 29 May 1901. The libretto was translated to Polish by Paderewski and Stanisław Rossowski for a performance in Lwów (today Lviv, also Lvov) on 8 June 1901.

== Performance history ==
After its premiere in Dresden (Ernst von Schuch conducting), and its Polish version premiere in Lwów, it was performed in Polish at the Teatr Wielki, Warsaw on May 24, 1902. In that year the original German version was also performed in Prague, Zurich, Monte Carlo, Nice, Bonn and Kiev.

The American premiere (sung in English) took place on the stage of the Metropolitan Opera House on February 14, 1902, with the debut of Alexander von Bandrowski in the title role, Walter Damrosch (a friend of the composer) conducting. The opera initially received an enthusiastic reception, with the premiere being marked as "one of high distinction." Nevertheless, it received only 9 performances in the season 1901/1902 (of which 4 performances were staged in New York City) and has never been revived there since. Manru remains to this day the only Polish opera ever presented at the Metropolitan Opera.

== Performance history ==
According to "Opera Guide" by Jozef Kanski, (PWM 1978) "Grand Opera Theatre in Warsaw revived the work in 1930 and gave a further run of performances in 1936. Poznán Opera launched a completely new production in 1938. Since 1945 there have been no productions outside Poland. The Polish performances included ones in Poznán and Warsaw in 1961 and another in Wrocław in 1990 to mark the composer’s 130th birthday. In 2001, this time to mark the 60th anniversary of Paderewski’s death, Wrocław Opera gave a concert performance. It is this version on which the present recording is based.". The French premiere was given at Opéra national de Lorraine on 9 May 2023.

== Available recordings ==
- CD Lower Silesian Opera House, cond. Ewa Michnik, live performance Wroclaw (2001), DUX 0368/0369, World premiere recording of "Manru"
- DVD Opera Nova Bydgoszcz DUX 9793/2011, 2013
- DVD Manru - Peter Berger, Ewa Tracz, Monika Ledzion-Porcynska, Anna Lubanska, Mikolaj Zalasinski, Dariusz Machej, Lukasz Golinski, Maciej Ufniak, Stanislaw Tomanek, Teatru Wielkiego-Opery Narodowej, Grzegorz Nowak 2021 Frederick Chopin Institute
