= Symphony in B minor (Paderewski) =

Musical work composed by Ignacy Jan Paderewski

Ignacy Jan Paderewski in 1900

The Symphony in B minor "Polonia", Op. 24, was written by Ignacy Jan Paderewski between 1903 and 1908. It was first publicly performed in 1909. Despite living for another 32 years, this symphony was Paderewski's final major composition; his only subsequent work was a hymn for male chorus in 1917. Around 1910, he embarked on a political career that culminated in his appointment as the first Prime Minister of independent Poland and his role in signing the Treaty of Versailles in 1919. Paderewski later resumed his career as a distinguished pianist.

== History ==
Paderewski started sketching the Symphony in B minor in his home near Morges in Switzerland in 1903. The work was completed in 1908 and was given a private performance in Lausanne on 26 December 1908. Its public premiere was with the Boston Symphony Orchestra under the German conductor Max Fiedler, on 12 February 1909. It was soon performed in Paris under André Messager, and in London under Hans Richter. The symphony had its Polish premiere in January 1911, where it was presented to celebrate the centenary of the birth of Frédéric Chopin, conducted by Paderewski's devoted friend Henryk Opieński. It also had performances in Philadelphia, New York and Baltimore. It has had little concert exposure since that time. To mark the 70th anniversary of the composer's death, it was performed in June 2011 at the Polish Presidential Palace under the patronage of President Bronisław Komorowski, by Sinfonia Varsovia under Jerzy Maksymiuk. (Maksymiuk made the first Western un-cut recording of the work in 1998.)

== Composition ==
"Polonia" is in three movements, although Paderewski originally planned a four-movement work, which would have included a scherzo. As it is, the three movements he did write take about 75 minutes to perform, which extraordinary length has often caused it (particularly the finale) to be cut in performance and recording.

The three movements are:

1. Adagio maestoso – Allegro vivace (30')
2. Andante con moto (17')
3. Vivace (27')

It is often described as a programme symphony, the three movements depicting:

- the glorious days of Poland of the past
- Poland of the present day (1907), at the nadir of political subjugation
- the approach of a happier future for Poland.

The inspiration for the title "Polonia" seems to be a series of eight ‘cartoons’ published under that title in 1863 by Artur Grottger, depicting the grim realities of everyday life and struggle under Russian occupation. Grottger's "Polonia" was a response to the failed insurrection of 1863-65 known as the January Uprising. Paderewski initially intended to dedicate the work to the 40th anniversary of that event, in which his own father was caught up and even arrested, but no such dedication appears in the score.

The music is expansive and discursive, not sticking closely to any pre-determined form. This quality has attracted comment that Paderewski seems to often lose his way, and also overdevelops his themes.

It is lush and romantic in texture, leading to comparisons with the music of Liszt, Tchaikovsky, Sibelius, Rachmaninoff, Mahler, Scriabin, Glazunov, Balakirev, Myaskovsky, Korngold, Glière, Elgar, Rimsky-Korsakov, Richard Strauss, and even a precursor of Shostakovich.

The score very unusually calls for three sarrusophones, a thunder sheet and an organ. The full instrumentation is: piccolo, 3 flutes, 2 oboes, English horn, 2 clarinets in A, bass clarinet in A, 2 bassoons, contrabassoon, 4 horns in F, 4 trumpets in F, 3 trombones, tuba, 3 contrabass sarrusophones in E♭, timpani, percussion (triangle, cymbals, tambour, tambour de Basque, tam-tam, glockenspiel, thunder sheet), harp, organ and strings.

The finale contains a disguised quotation of the Polish national anthem, Jeszcze Polska nie zginęła (Poland Is Not Yet Lost), in duple meter rather than the original's triple-time mazurka rhythm.

In 1915, Edward Elgar wrote an orchestral piece titled Polonia, Op. 76, which he dedicated to Paderewski.

== Recordings ==
- Pomeranian Philharmonic under Bohdan Wodiczko
- BBC Scottish Symphony Orchestra under Jerzy Maksymiuk
- Symphony Orchestra Music Academy, Kraków, under Wojciech Czepiel
- Lviv National Philharmonic Orchestra under Bohdan Boguszewski
