= Piano Concerto (Paderewski) =

- by Ignacy Jan Paderewski
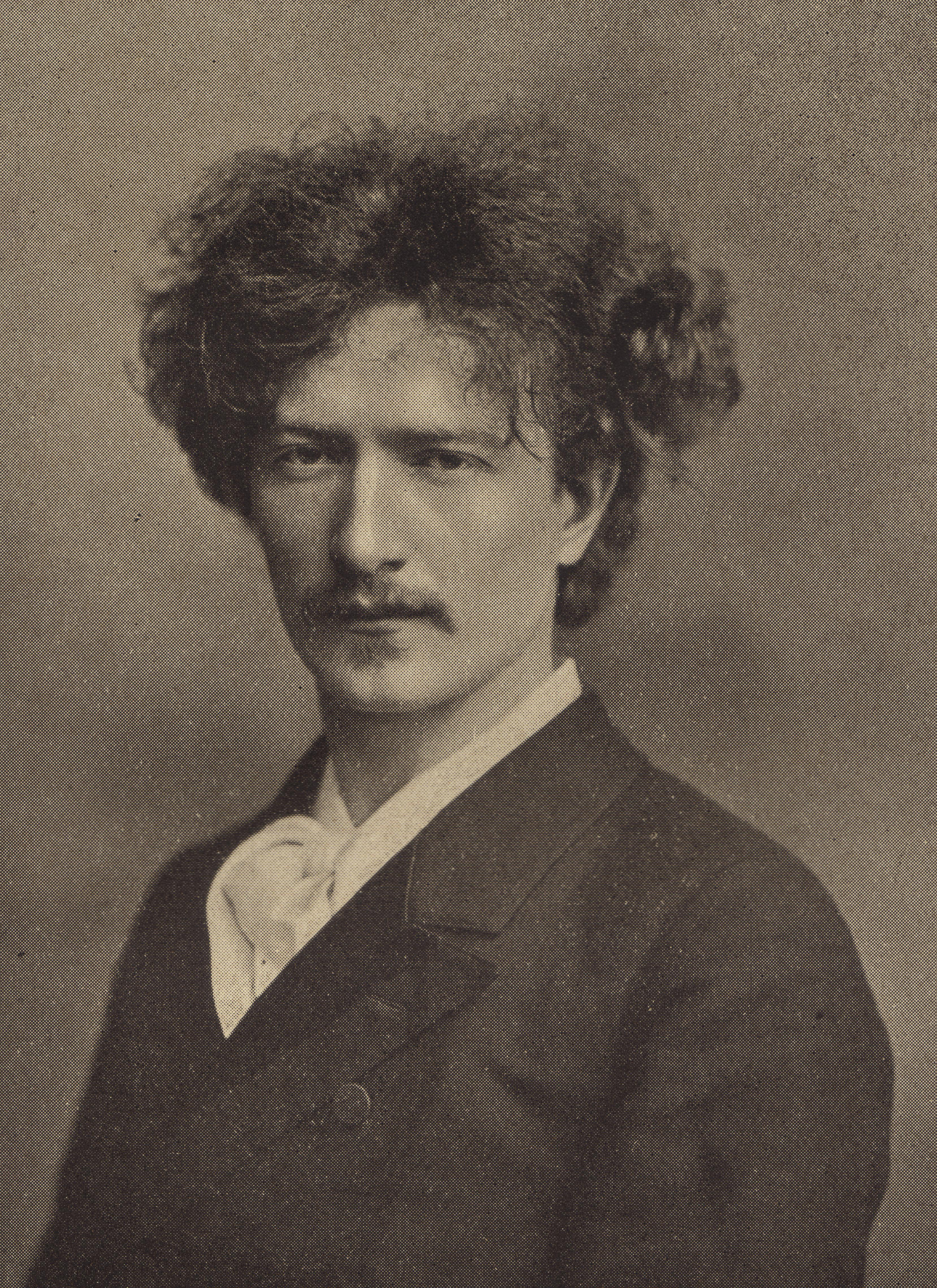
- The composer around 1892
- Key: A minor
- Opus: 17
- Period: Romantic
- Composed: 1888
- Movements: 3

Premiere
- Date: 20 January 1889
- Location: Vienna

The Piano Concerto in A minor, Op. 17, is the only piano concerto written by the Polish composer and pianist Ignacy Jan Paderewski. It was written in the composer's twenties, with the first movement dating back to 1882, although the majority of the work was composed in 1888 and scored in 1889. After its completion, the composer showed the concerto to his friend Saint-Saëns, who admired it, and especially the andante movement. It premiered the same year in Vienna, achieving great success, where it was conducted by Hans Richter.

The work was dedicated to Paderewski's teacher Theodor Leschetizky.

== Composition ==
The concerto is scored for solo piano, piccolo, 2 flutes, 2 oboes (2nd doubling English horn), 2 clarinets, 2 bassoons, 4 horns, 2 trumpets, 3 trombones, timpani, and strings.

It is divided into three movements:

1. Allegro
2. Romanze. Andante
3. Finale. Allegro molto vivace (A major)

The piano concerto usually lasts from 30 to 40 minutes, depending on the interpretation.

== Notable recordings ==
- Earl Wild in 1971 with Arthur Fiedler and the London Symphony Orchestra
- Piers Lane in 1991 with Jerzy Maksymiuk and the BBC Scottish Symphony Orchestra.
- Janina Fialkowska in 1999 with Antoni Wit and the Polish National Radio Symphony Orchestra.
- Ian Hobson in 2002 with Jerzy Maksymiuk and Sinfonia Varsovia.
- Dang Thai Son in 2018 with Vladimir Ashkenazy and Philharmonia Orchestra.
- Claire Huangci in 2019 with Shi-Yeon Sung and Deutsche Radio Philharmonie Saarbrücken Kaiserslautern.
