= Ignacy Jan Paderewski =

Polish pianist, composer, intellectual and statesman (1860–1941)

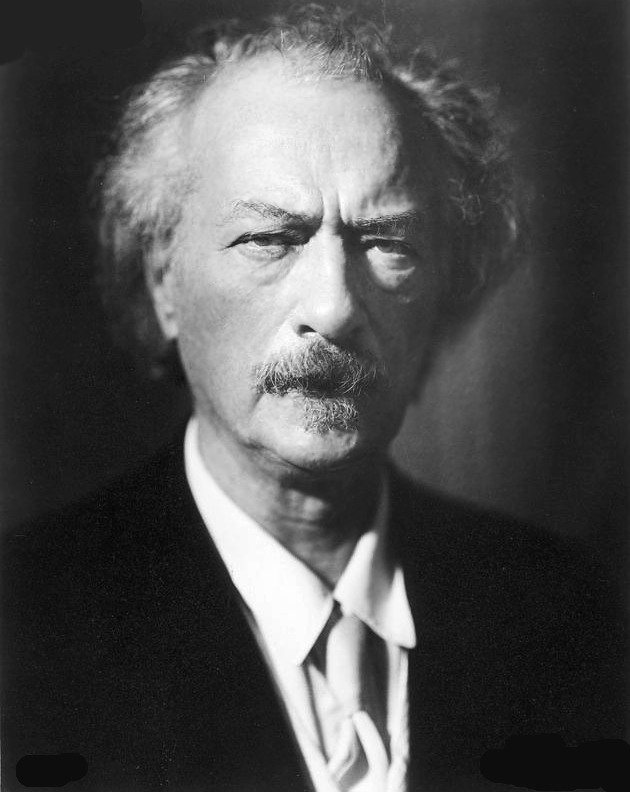
- Paderewski c. 1935

Prime Minister of Poland
- In office 18 January 1919 – 27 November 1919
- Chief of State: Józef Piłsudski
- Preceded by: Jędrzej Moraczewski
- Succeeded by: Leopold Skulski

Minister of Foreign Affairs
- In office 16 January 1919 – 9 December 1919
- Prime Minister: Himself; Leopold Skulski
- Preceded by: Leon Wasilewski
- Succeeded by: Władysław Wróblewski

Chief of the National Council of Poland
- In office 9 December 1939 – 29 June 1941

Personal details
- Born: Ignacy Jan Paderewski; 6 November 1860 Kurylivka, Podolia Governorate, Russian Empire
- Died: 29 June 1941 (aged 80) New York City, US
- Spouses: Antonina Korsakówna (m. 1880; died 1880); Helena von Rosen (m. 1899; died 1934)
- Children: 3
- Education: Warsaw Conservatory
- Profession: Pianist, composer, politician, intellectual, and diplomat

Ignacy Jan Paderewski (Polish: [iɡˈnatsɨ ˈjan padɛˈrɛfskʲi]; 6 November [O.S. 25 October] 1860 [or 1859] – 29 June 1941) was a Polish pianist, composer, philanthropist, and statesman. As a politician and diplomat, Paderewski was vital to securing international recognition of the newly formed Second Polish Republic in 1919. A musical virtuoso, he rose to prominence as a musician and composer in the late 1880s and toured widely in Europe and the United States. He wrote orchestral, instrumental, and vocal works and an opera, Manru (premiered 1901), which remains the only opera by a Polish composer performed by the Metropolitan Opera.

Paderewski's renown allowed access to influential political and cultural circles in the West. During World War I, he largely suspended concert touring to focus on political advocacy and fundraising, working with organizations such as the Polish National Committee in Paris and relief initiatives in Britain and the United States. In the United States, he met President Woodrow Wilson and contributed to efforts that helped make an independent Poland part of the postwar settlement. In newly independent Poland, Józef Piłsudski appointed Paderewski prime minister and minister of foreign affairs (January–December 1919). He represented Poland at the Paris Peace Conference alongside Roman Dmowski and signed the Treaty of Versailles, which recognized Polish independence after World War I.

His government also oversaw parliamentary elections and legislation on minority protections, though he faced criticism as an administrator and resigned in December 1919. After 1919, Paderewski returned to music and lived most of his later life abroad, while remaining involved in opposition politics in the 1930s as part of the Front Morges circle in Switzerland. After the 1939 invasion of Poland, Paderewski re-entered public life as head of the National Council of Poland, a parliament-in-exile in London, and again sought support for the Allied war effort through broadcasts and fundraising concerts. He died in New York in 1941; he was buried temporarily at Arlington National Cemetery, and in 1992 his remains were reinterred in Warsaw.

== Early life and education ==
Paderewski was born to Polish parents in the village of Kurilovka, in the Podolia Governorate of the Russian Empire. The village is now part of the Khmilnyk raion of Vinnytsia Oblast in Ukraine. His father, Jan Paderewski, administered large estates. His mother, Poliksena, née Nowicka, died several months after Paderewski was born, and he was raised mostly by distant relatives.

From his early childhood, Paderewski was interested in music. He initially lived at a private estate near Zhytomyr, where he had moved with his father. However, soon after his father's arrest in connection with the January Uprising of 1863, he was adopted by his aunt. After being released, Paderewski's father married again and moved to the town of Sudylkov, near Shepetovka.

Paderewski began playing the piano in early childhood, taking informal piano lessons by age six under tutors like Filip Runowski and Piotr Sowiński. Because he lived on an isolated estate, his initial training was highly irregular. He did not receive systematic, formal instruction until he was sent to study at the Warsaw Conservatory—now the Chopin University of Music—in 1872 at age 11. Upon graduating in 1878, he became a piano tutor at his alma mater. In 1880, Paderewski married fellow conservatory student Antonina Korsakówna. Their son Alfred was born severely handicapped the following year. Antonina did not recover from childbirth, and died several weeks later. Paderewski opted to devote himself to music, and left his son to be cared for by friends. In 1881, he went to Berlin to study music composition with Friedrich Kiel and Heinrich Urban.

In 1884, a chance meeting with a famous Polish actress, Helena Modjeska, began his career as a virtuoso pianist. Modrzejewska arranged for a public concert and joint appearance in Kraków's Hotel Saski to raise funds for Paderewski's further piano study. The scheme was a tremendous success and Paderewski soon moved to Vienna, where he studied with Theodor Leschetizky (Teodor Leszetycki).

== Pianist, composer and supporter of new composers ==
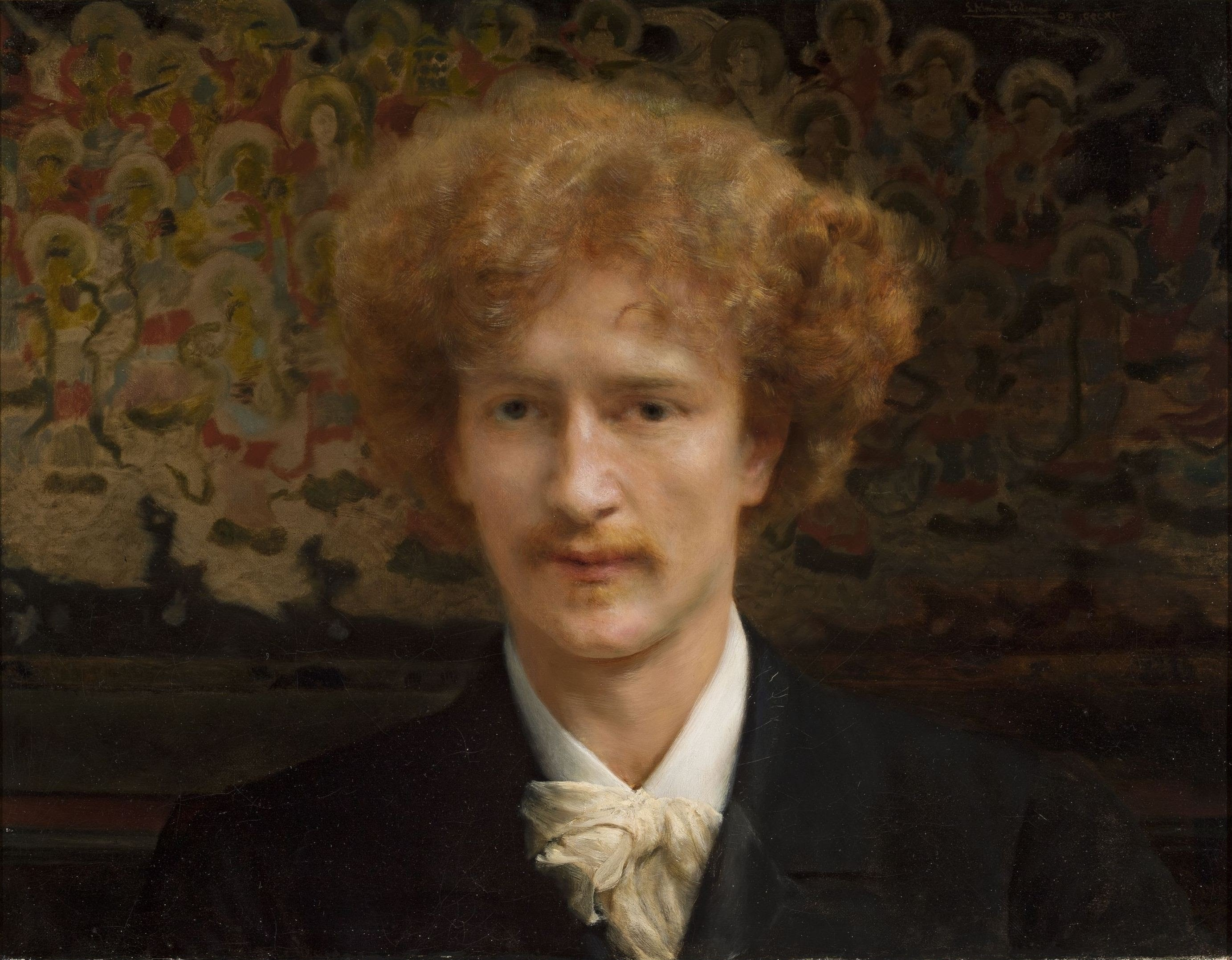
A portrait of Ignacy Jan Paderewski, by painter Lawrence Alma-Tadema, 1890

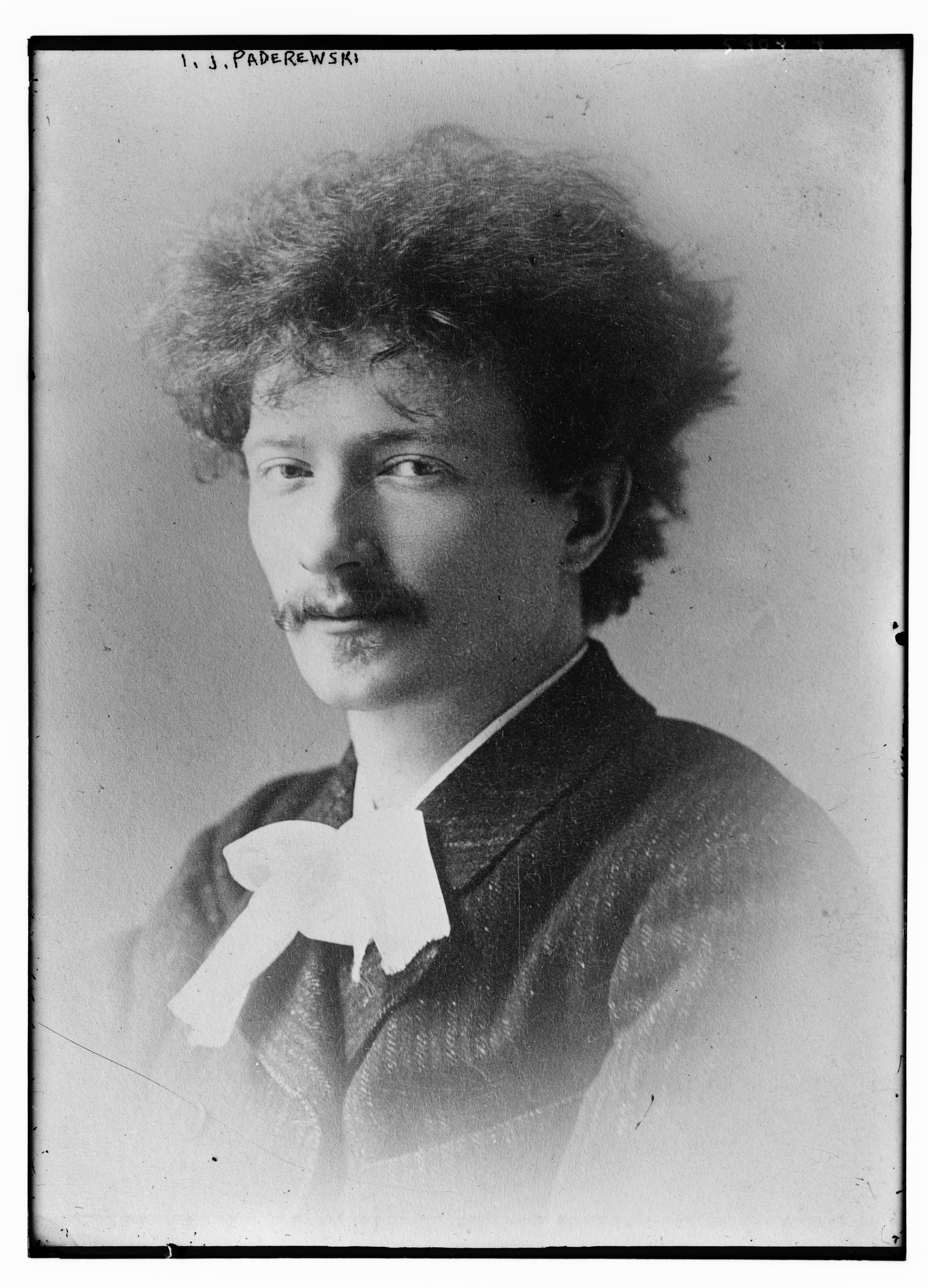
Paderewski photographed early in his career

Paderewski dedicated three more years to diligent study, and a teaching appointment at the conservatory in Strasbourg which Leschetizky arranged. In 1887, he made his concert debut in Vienna, soon gaining great popularity, and had popular successes in Paris in 1889 and in London in 1890. Audiences responded to his brilliant playing with almost extravagant displays of admiration, and Paderewski also gained access to the halls of power. In 1891, he repeated his triumphs on an American tour. He toured the country more than 30 times for the next five decades and it would become his second home. His stage presence, striking looks, and immense charisma contributed to his stage success, which later proved important in his political and charitable activities. His name became synonymous with the highest level of piano virtuosity. Not everyone was equally impressed, however. After hearing Paderewski for the first time, when Paderewski was exhausted from his American tour, Moriz Rosenthal quipped, "Yes, he plays well, I suppose, but he's no Paderewski."

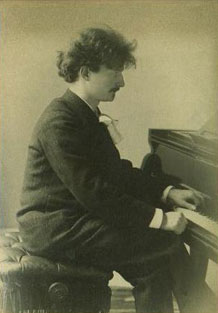
Paderewski the pianist

Paderewski kept up a furious pace of touring and composition, including many of his own piano works in his concerts. He also wrote an opera, Manru, which had its official premiere in Lviv in 1901. A "lyric drama", Manru is an ambitious work that was formally inspired by Wagner's music dramas. It lacks an overture and closed-form arias, but uses Wagner's device of leitmotifs to represent characters and ideas. The story centres on a doomed love triangle, social inequality, and racial prejudice (Manru is a Gypsy), and is set in the Tatra Mountains. It is still the only opera by a Polish composer that the Metropolitan Opera has performed in its 135-year history. In addition to the Met, a private royal viewing of Manru was staged in Dresden, and it was staged in Prague, Cologne, Zürich, Warsaw, Philadelphia, Boston, Chicago, Pittsburgh and Baltimore, Moscow, and Kiev.

In 1904, Paderewski, accompanied by his second wife, entourage, parrot, and Érard piano, gave concerts in Australia and New Zealand, in collaboration with Polish-French composer Henri Kowalski. Paderewski toured tirelessly around the world and was the first to give a solo performance at the new 3,000-seat Carnegie Hall. In 1909 came the premiere of his Symphony in B minor "Polonia", a massive work lasting 75 minutes, which would be later transcribed for organ by the Polish organist Jerzy Dziubiński. Paderewski's compositions were quite popular in his lifetime and, for a time, entered the orchestral repertoire, particularly his Fantaisie polonaise sur des thèmes originaux (Polish Fantasy on Original Themes) for piano and orchestra, Piano Concerto in A minor, and Polonia symphony. His piano miniatures became especially popular, and the Minuet in G major, Op. 14 No. 1, written in the style of Mozart, became one of the most recognized piano tunes of all time. Despite his relentless touring schedule and his political and charitable engagements, Paderewski left a legacy of over 70 orchestral, instrumental, and vocal works.

All of his works evoke a romantic image of Poland. They incorporate references to Polish dances, such as the polonaise, krakowiak, and mazurka, and highlander music (Tatra album [Album tatrzańskie], op. 12, Polish Dances [Tańce polskie], op. 5). Paderewski's love of his country is reflected in the titles of his compositions, including Polish Fantasy [Fantazja polska], op. 19 and Symphony in B minor "Polonia", which includes a quote from Dąbrowski's Mazurka [Mazurek Dąbrowskiego]), themes (Manru), and musical settings of quotes from Polish poets (e.g., Asnyk and Mickiewicz).

== Philanthropy ==
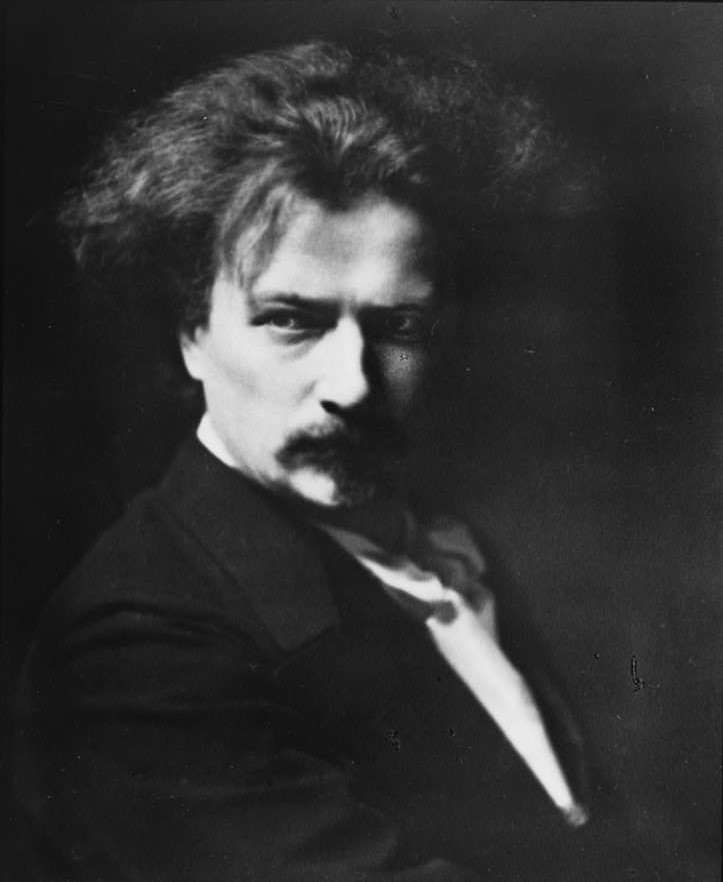
Paderewski

In 1896, Paderewski donated US$10,000 to establish a trust fund to encourage American-born composers. The fund underwrote a triennial the Paderewski Prize competition that began in 1901. Paderewski also launched a similar contest in Leipzig in 1898. He was so popular internationally that the music hall duo "The Two Bobs" had a hit song in 1916 in music halls across Britain with the song "When Paderewski Plays". He was a favorite of concert audiences around the globe and women, especially, admired his performances.

By the turn of the century, Paderewski was an extremely wealthy man, generously donating to numerous causes and charities, and sponsoring monuments, among them the Washington Arch in New York, in 1892. Paderewski shared his fortune generously with fellow countrymen, as well as with citizens and foundations from around the world. He established a foundation for young American musicians and the students of Stanford University (1896), another at the Parisian Conservatory (1909), yet another scholarship fund at the Ecole Normale (1924), funded students of the Moscow Conservatory and the Saint Petersburg Conservatory (1899), as well as spas in the Alps (1928), for the British Legion.

During the Great Depression, Paderewski supported unemployed musicians in the United States (1932) and the unemployed in Switzerland in 1937. He publicly supported an insurance fund for musicians in London (1933) and aided Jewish intellectuals in Paris (1933). He also supported orphanages and the Maternity Centre in New York. The many Paderewski-sponsored concert halls and monuments included Debussy (1931) and Édouard Colonne (1923) monuments in Paris, Liszt Monument in Weimar, Beethoven Monument in Bonn, Chopin Monument in Żelazowa Wola (the composer's birthplace), Kosciuszko Monument in Chicago, and Washington Arch in New York.

== California ==
In 1913, Paderewski settled in the United States. On the eve of World War I and at the height of his fame, Paderewski bought a 2,000-acre (810-ha) property, Rancho San Ignacio, near Paso Robles, in San Luis Obispo County, in California's Central Coast region. A decade later, he planted Petite Sirah and Zinfandel on his vineyard in the Adelaida area and the fruit was processed at the nearby York Mountain Winery, which was, as it still is, one of the best-known wineries between Los Angeles and San Francisco.

== Politician and diplomat ==
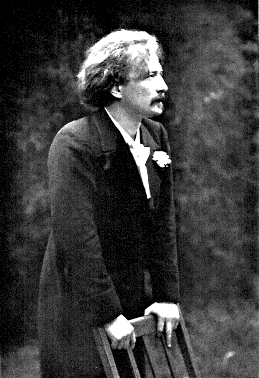
Paderewski, c. 1900

In 1910, Paderewski funded the Grunwald Monument in Kraków to commemorate the 500th anniversary of the Battle of Grunwald. The monument's unveiling led to great patriotic demonstrations. In speaking to the gathered throng, Paderewski captured their hearts and minds for the political cause. His delivery needed no recourse to notes. Paderewski's status as an artist and philanthropist and not as a member of any of the many Polish political factions became one of his greatest assets and so he rose above the quarrels, and he could legitimately appeal to higher ideals of unity, sacrifice, charity, and work for common goals.

In World War I, Paderewski became an active member of the Polish National Committee in Paris, which was soon accepted by the Triple Entente as the representative of the forces trying to create the state of Poland. Paderewski became the committee's spokesman, and soon, he and his wife also formed other organizations, including the Polish Relief Fund in London, and the White Cross Society in the United States. Paderewski met the English composer Edward Elgar, who used a theme from Paderewski's Fantasie Polonaise in his work Polonia, written for the Polish Relief Fund concert in London on 6 July 1916 (the title certainly recognises Paderewski's Symphony in B minor).

Paderewski urged fellow Polish immigrants to join the Polish armed forces in France, and pressed elbows with all the dignitaries and influential men whose salons he could enter. He spoke to Americans directly in public speeches and on the radio, appealing to them to remember the fate of his nation. He kept such a demanding schedule of public appearances, fundraisers and meetings that he stopped musical touring altogether for a few years, instead dedicating himself to diplomatic activity. In January 1917, on the eve of the American entry into the war, US President Woodrow Wilson's main advisor, Edward M. House, turned to Paderewski to prepare a memorandum on the Polish situation. Two weeks later, Wilson spoke before Congress and issued a challenge to the status quo: "I take it for granted that statesmen everywhere are agreed that there should be a united, independent, autonomous Poland." Paderewski also proposed that same year to reorganise Poland into a federation called the United States of Poland. The establishment of "New Poland" became one of Wilson's famous Fourteen Points, the principles that Wilson followed during peace negotiations to end World War I. In April 1918, Paderewski met leaders of the American Jewish Committee in New York City, in an unsuccessful attempt to broker a deal in which organised Jewish groups would support Polish territorial ambitions in exchange for support for equal rights. However, it soon became clear that no plan would satisfy both Jewish leaders and Roman Dmowski, the head of the Polish National Committee, who was strongly anti-Semitic.

Reports of the Lwów pogrom reverberated around the world and gravely damaged the reputation of the newly recreated Polish state under Paderewski. Prime Minister Ignacy Paderewski, complained bitterly to the US President Woodrow Wilson about anti-Polish propaganda in the United States, declaring that the violence was mainly a result of 'Jewish arrogance and agitation'.

At the end of the war, with the fate of the city of Poznań and the whole region of Greater Poland (Wielkopolska) still undecided, Paderewski visited Poznań. Following his public speech there on 27 December 1918, the Polish inhabitants of the city began the Greater Poland uprising against Germany.

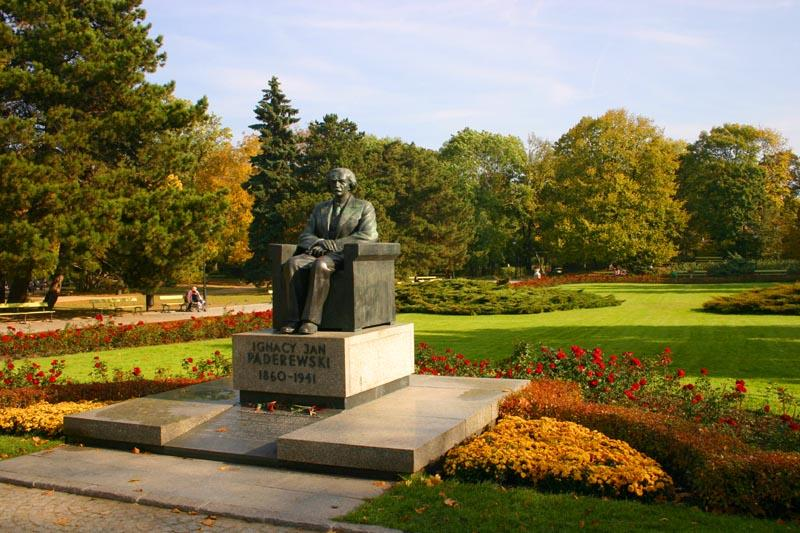
Monument to Paderewski in Warsaw's Ujazdów Park

In 1919, in the newly independent Poland, Józef Piłsudski, who was the Chief of State, appointed Paderewski as the Prime Minister and Minister of Foreign Affairs of Poland (January 1919 – December 1919). Paderewski and Roman Dmowski represented Poland at the 1919 Paris Peace Conference and dealt with issues regarding territorial claims and minority rights. Paderewski signed the Treaty of Versailles, which recognized Polish independence won after World War I. At the Paris Peace Conference, the Polish deputation were irate at the Western powers insistence they sign a 'Minorities Treaty'. The treaty was supposed to guarantee fair treatment of their Ukrainian, Jewish and German minorities, a third of the population of their republic. The treaty was imposed by the Great Powers as a condition for their recognition of Polish independence.

The Polish legation's opposition to the treaty prompted David Lloyd George to say that the Poles were 'more imperialists than either England or France'. Paderewski heatedly rejected Lloyd George's suggestion, stating that Poland had shown in the past that it was fit to govern 'primitive people like the Ruthenians, even like the Ukrainians'.

There were some achievements during Paderewski's ten-month period in government: democratic elections to Parliament, the ratification of the Treaty of Versailles, legislation on protection of ethnic minorities in the new state, and the establishment of a public education system. But Paderewski "proved to be a poor administrator and worse politician" and resigned from the Government in December 1919, having received criticism for his perceived submissiveness to the Western powers. At the request of his successor as Prime Minister, Władysław Grabski, Paderewski represented Poland at the Spa Conference, when Poland was threatened by the Polish–Soviet War, but Piłsudski's success at the Battle of Warsaw later that year rendered those negotiations redundant, and put to an end Paderewski's hopes of regaining office.

== Return to music ==
In 1922, Paderewski retired from politics and returned to his musical life. His first concert after a long break, held at Carnegie Hall, was a significant success. He also filled the 20,000-seat Madison Square Garden, and toured the United States in a private railway car.

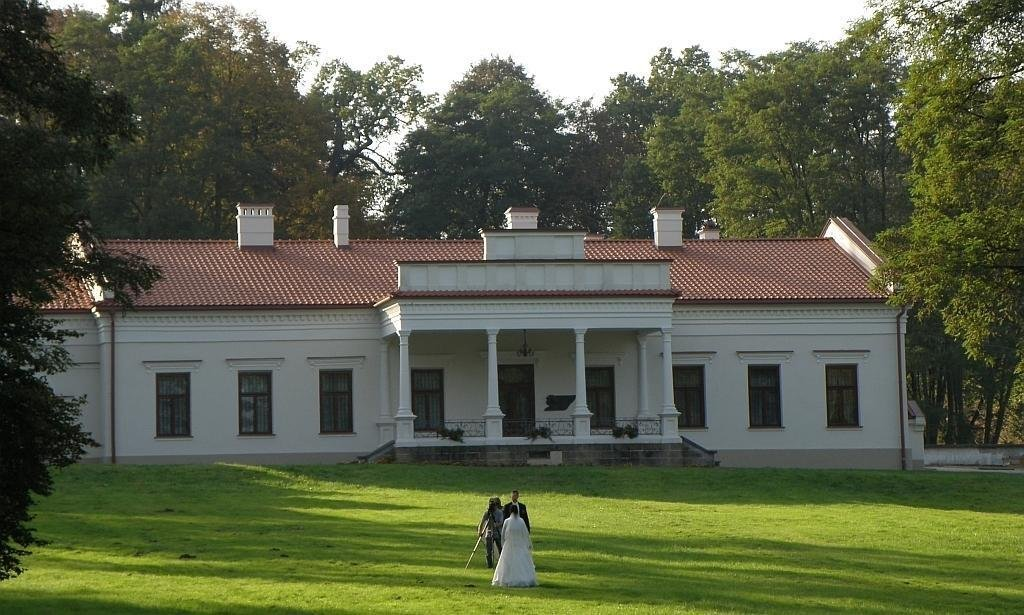
His manor house (bought in 1897) in Kąśna Dolna near Tarnów in Poland

In 1897, Paderewski had bought the manor house of the former Duchess of Otrante near Morges, Switzerland, where he rested between concert tours. After Piłsudski's coup d'état in 1926, Paderewski became an active member of the opposition to Sanacja rule. In 1936, two years after his second wife's death at their Swiss home, a coalition of members of the opposition met in the mansion and was nicknamed the Front Morges after the village.

By 1936, Paderewski agreed to appear in a film that showcased his talent and art. Although the proposal had come while the mourning Paderewski avoided public appearances, the film project went ahead. It became notable, primarily, for its rare footage of his piano performance. The exiled German-born director, Lothar Mendes, directed the feature, which was released in Britain in 1937 as Moonlight Sonata, and was re-titled The Charmer when re-released in the US in 1943.

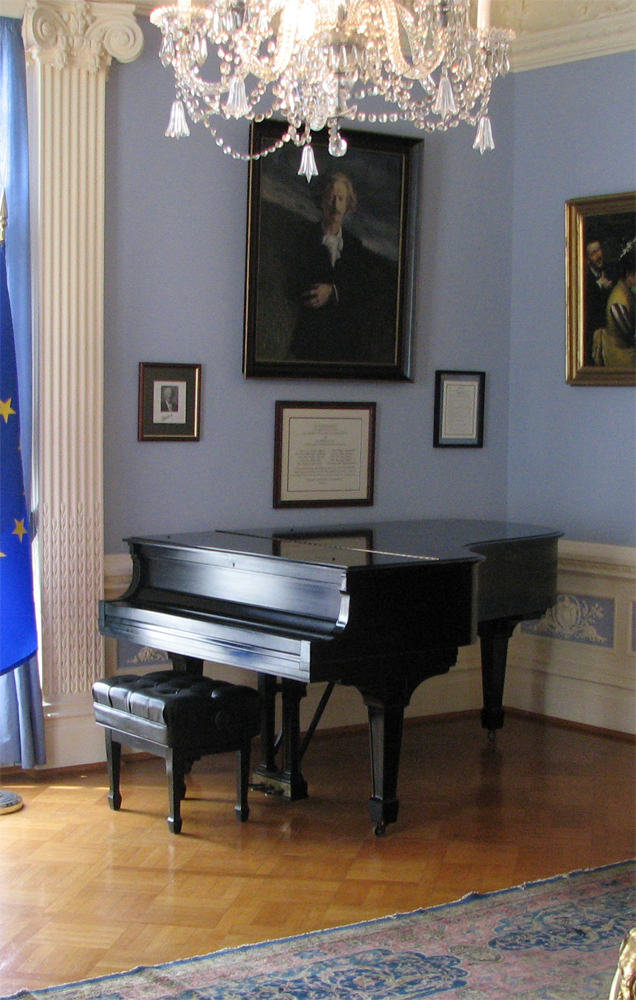
Paderewski's Steinway & Sons grand piano at the Polish Embassy in Washington, D.C.

In November 1937, Paderewski agreed to take on one last piano student. The musician was Witold Małcużyński, who had won third place at the International Chopin Piano Competition.

== Return to public life ==
After the invasion of Poland in 1939, Paderewski returned to public life. In 1940, he became the head of the National Council of Poland, a Polish sejm (parliament) in exile in London. He again turned to America for help and his broadcast was carried by over 100 radio stations in the United States and Canada. He advocated in person for aid to Europe and the defeat of Nazism.

In 1941, Paderewski witnessed a touching tribute to his artistry and humanitarianism as US cities celebrated the 50th anniversary of his first American tour by putting on a Paderewski Week, with over 6000 concerts in his honour. The 80-year-old artist also restarted his Polish Relief Fund and gave several concerts to gather money for it. However, his mind was not what it had once been and, scheduled again to play Madison Square Garden, he refused to appear, insisting that he had already played the concert, presumably remembering his performance there in the 1920s.

== Personal life ==
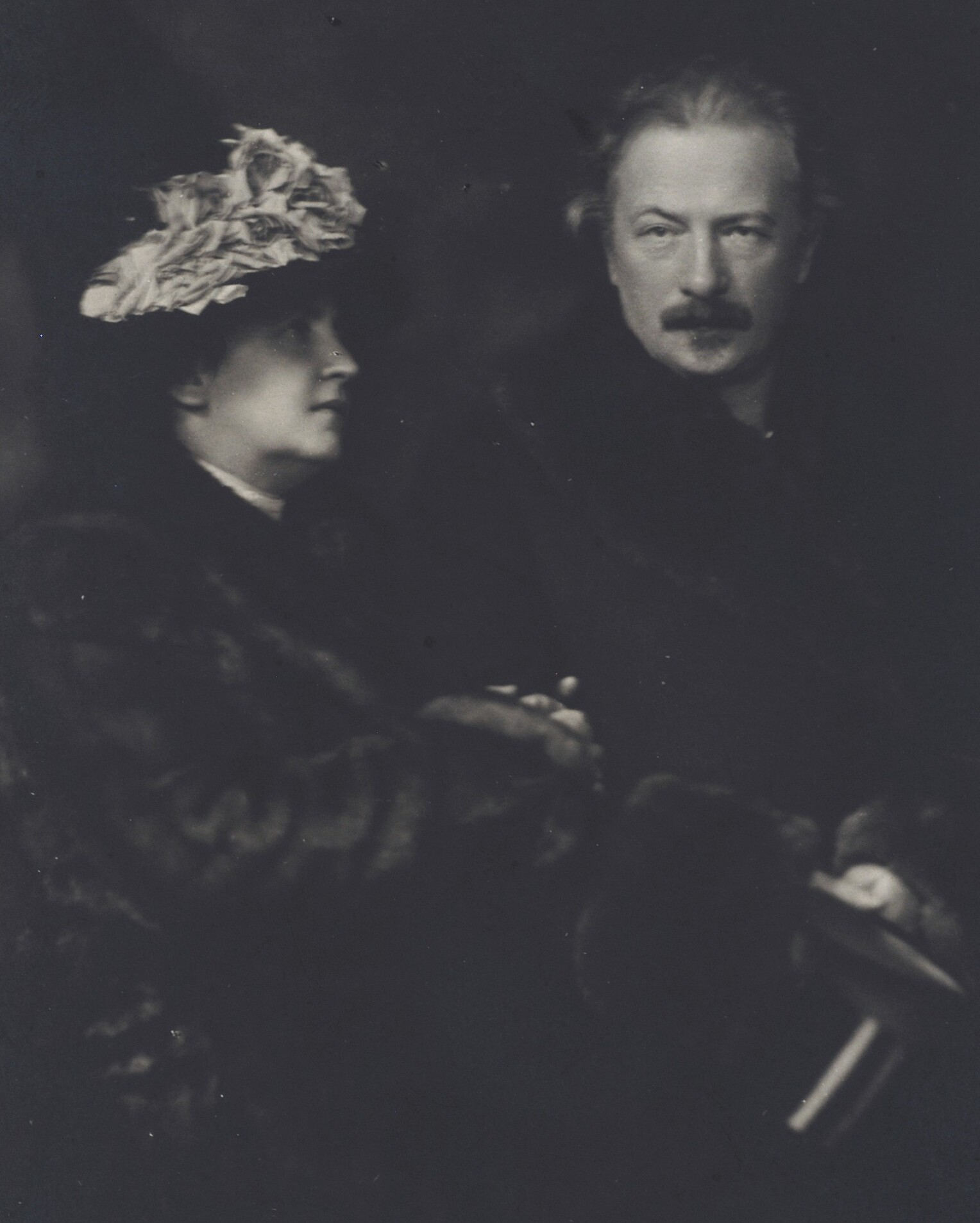
Paderewski with his second wife, c. 1915-1918

In 1880, Paderewski married a fellow student, Antonina Korsakówna. The following year, their son Alfred was born severely handicapped. Antonina never recovered from childbirth and died several weeks later. Paderewski decided to devote himself to music and left his son in the care of friends.

On 31 May 1899, he married his second wife, Helena Paderewska (née von Rosen, 1856–1934), shortly after she received an annulment of a prior marriage. While she had previously cared for his son Alfred (1880–1901), they had no children together.

== Death and legacy ==
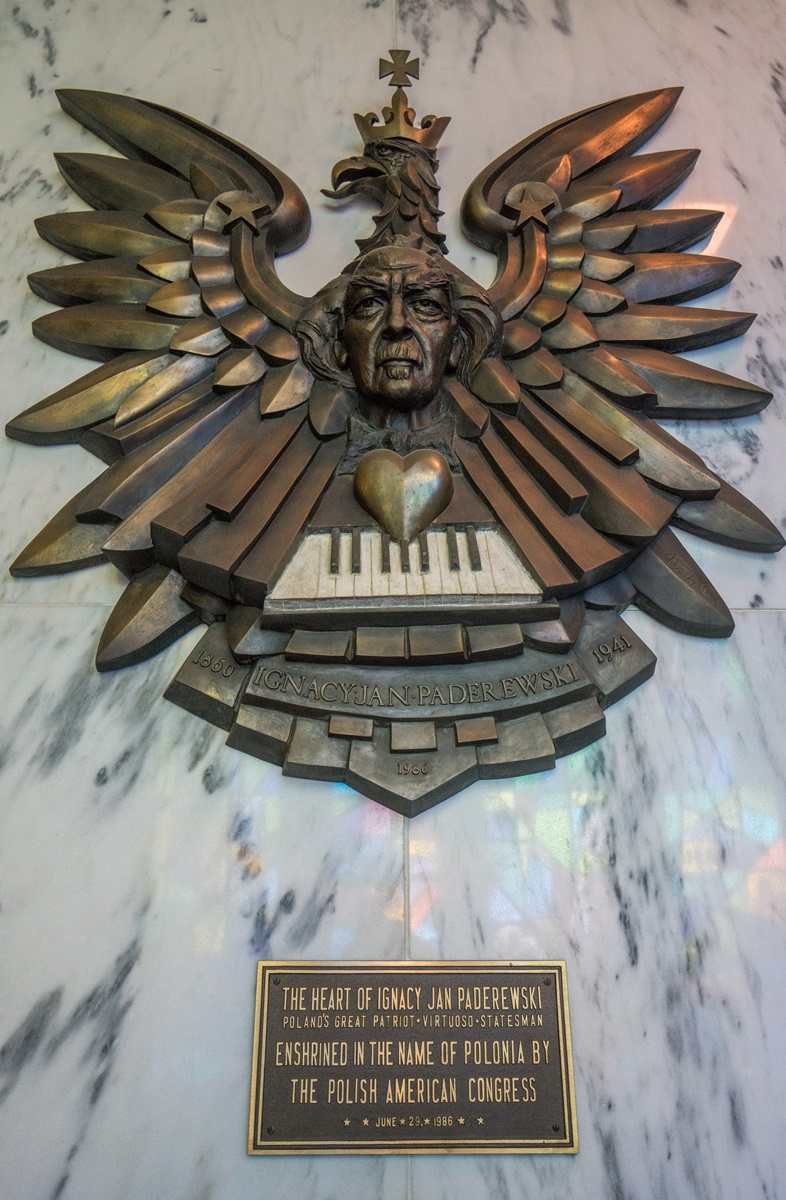
Paderewski's encased heart muscle within this bronze plaque

Paderewski fell ill on tour on 27 June 1941. Sylwin Strakacz bypassed his secretary and other tour personnel to summon physicians, who diagnosed pneumonia. Despite signs of improving health and recovery, Paderewski died in New York at 11:00 p.m., 29 June, aged 80. He was temporarily laid in repose in the crypt of the USS Maine Mast Memorial at Arlington National Cemetery, in Arlington, Virginia, near Washington, DC, despite anecdotal accounts that he wished to be buried in France, near his second wife and son.

In 1992, after the end of communist rule in Poland, his remains were transferred to Warsaw and placed in St. John's Archcathedral. His heart is encased in a bronze sculpture in the National Shrine of Our Lady of Czestochowa near Doylestown, Pennsylvania.

In early 1941, the music publisher Boosey & Hawkes commissioned 17 prominent composers to contribute a solo piano piece each for an album to commemorate the 50th anniversary of Paderewski's American debut in 1891. It became a posthumous tribute to Paderewski's entire life and work, Homage to Paderewski (1942). As well, Helena Paderewska had prepared a memoir of her husband's political activities between 1910 and 1920, the typescript of which was not published in either of their lifetimes but was discovered in 2015 by an archivist at the Hoover Institution and published.

Paderewski is credited as the chief editor of the edition of Chopin's complete works published by the Instytut Fryderyka Chopina, but he died before the work began.

=== Museum displays ===
The Polish Museum of America in Chicago received a donation of his personal possessions after his death in June 1941. Both Ignacy Paderewski and his sister, Antonina Paderewska Wilkonska were enthusiastic supporters and generous sponsors of the Museum. Antonina, executor of Ignacy's will, decided to donate the personal possessions to the Museum, as well as artifacts from his apartment in New York. The space was officially opened on 3 November 1941. Another museum in his honour exists at Morges, Switzerland, although Paderewski's mansion was razed in 1965.

=== Memorials and tributes ===
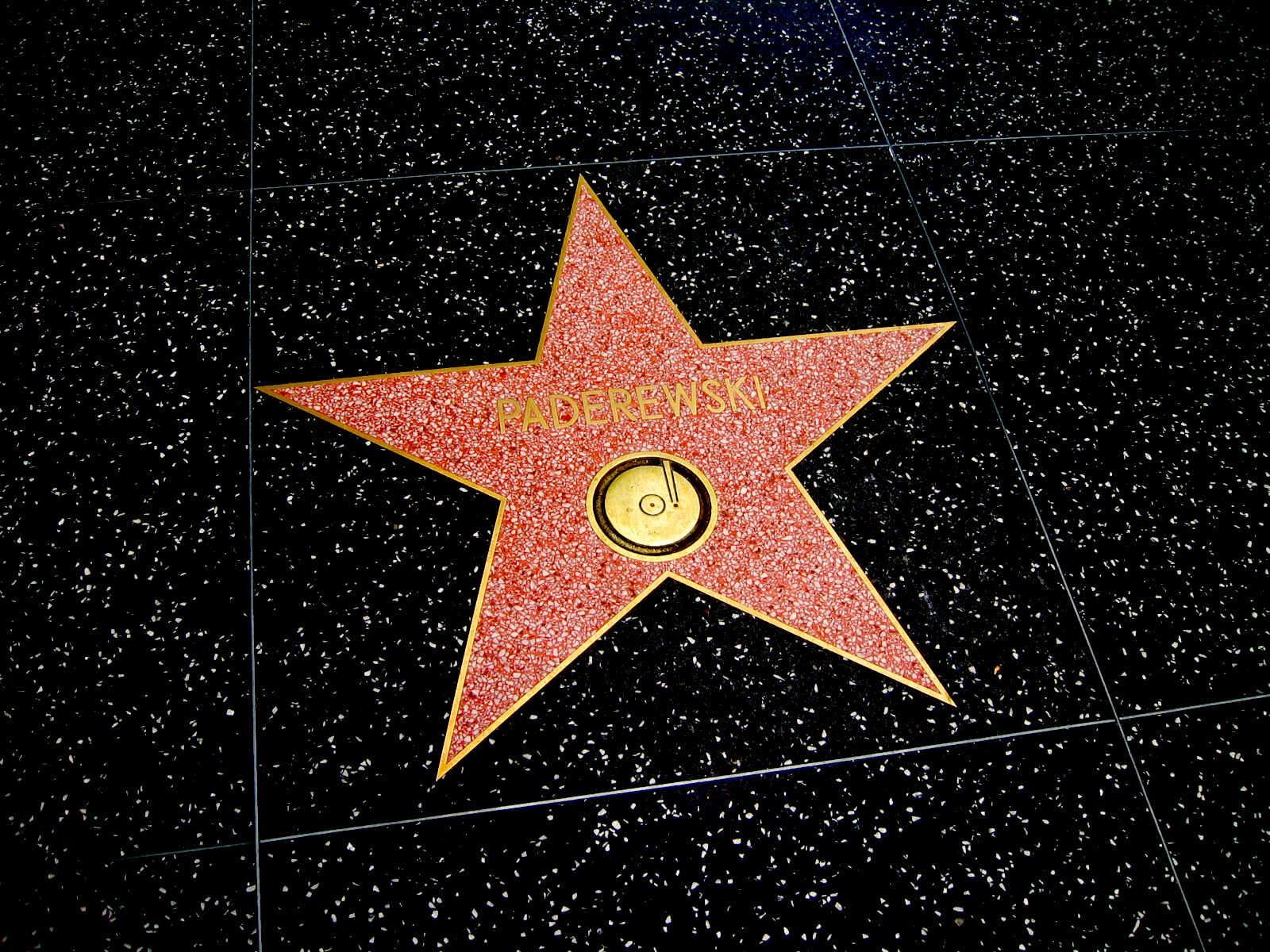
Paderewski's star on the Hollywood Walk of Fame

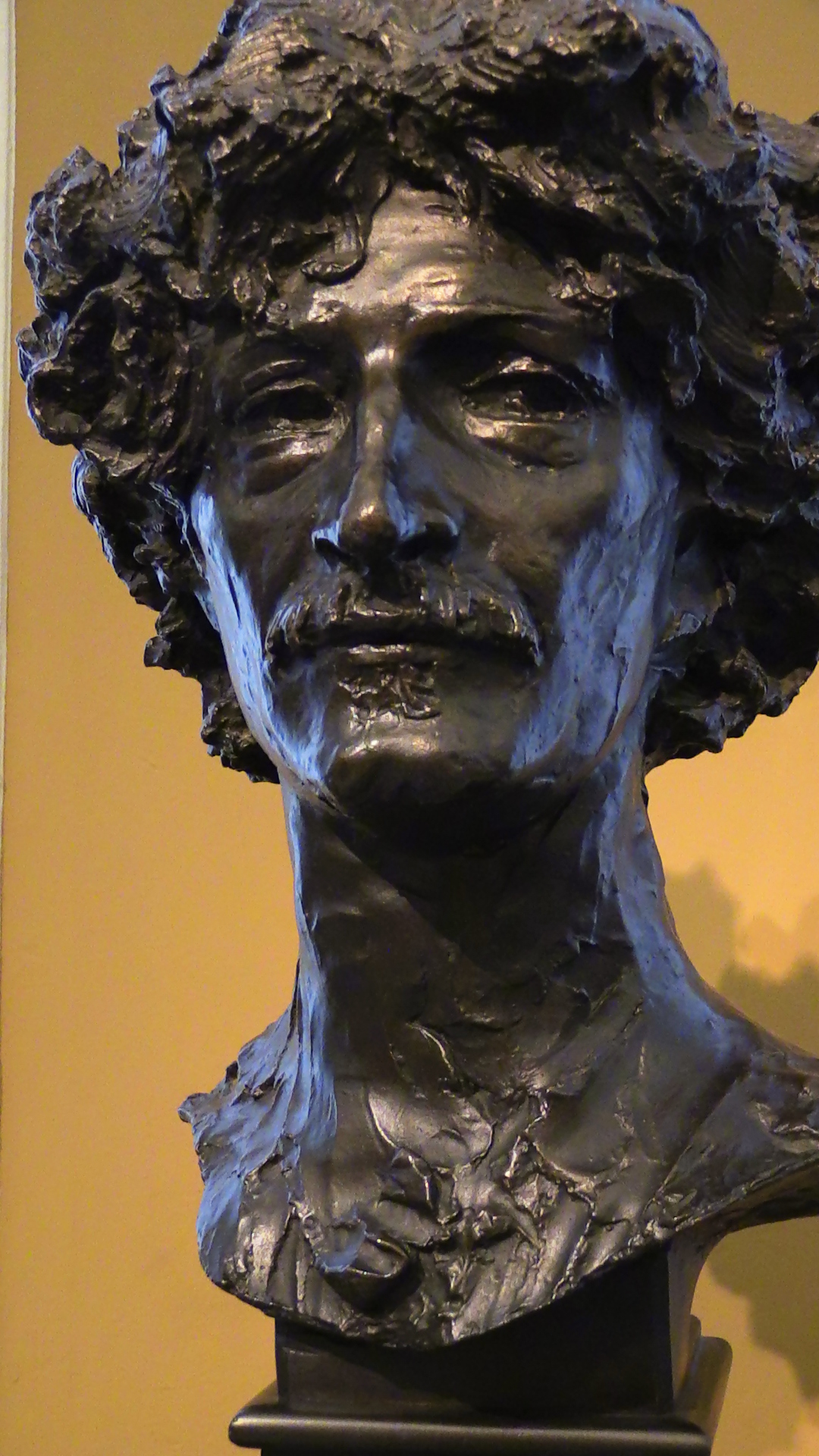
Alfred Gilbert's bust of Paderewski (1891), at the Victoria and Albert Museum

In 1948, the Ignacy Paderewski Foundation was established in New York City, on the initiative of the local Polish community, with the goal of promoting Polish culture in the United States. Two other Polish-American organizations are named in his honour and are dedicated to promoting the legacy of the maestro: the Paderewski Association in Chicago and the Paderewski Music Society in Southern California.

In the Irving Berlin song, "I Love a Piano", recorded in 1916 by Billy Murray, the narrator says: "And with the pedal, I love to meddle/When Paderewski comes this way./I'm so delighted, when I'm invited/To hear that long-haired genius play."

Charlie Chaplin wrote:

Paderewski had great charm, but there was something bourgeois about him, an over-emphasis of dignity. He was impressive with his long hair, severe, slanting moustache and the small tuft of hair under his lower lip, which I thought revealed some form of mystic vanity. At his recitals, with house lights lowered and the atmosphere sombre and awesome when he was about to sit on the piano stool, I always felt someone should pull it from under him. During the war I met him at the Ritz Hotel in New York and greeted him enthusiastically, asking if he were there to give a concert. With pontifical solemnity he replied: "I do not give concerts when I am in the service of my country." Paderewski became Prime Minister of Poland, but I felt like Clemenceau, who said to him during a conference of the ill-fated Versailles Treaty: "How is it that a gifted artist like you should stoop so low as to become a politician?"

There is an anecdote in circulation about Paderewski having been booked for a concert at Stanford by the future president Hoover and not receiving the full fee for his performance. Thomas F. Schwartz, Director of the Hoover Presidential Library, concludes:

There seems to be enough doubt by both Hoover and Paderewski to lend credence to the story in their respective memoirs other than to acknowledge that their first meeting may have been in 1896.

— Hoover and Paderewski (February 27, 2019)

His unusual combination of being a world-class pianist and successful politician led to Saul Kripke using Paderewski as a famous philosophical example in his article "A Puzzle about Belief." Paderewski was so famous that in the 1953 motion picture The 5,000 Fingers of Dr. T., written by Theodor Seuss Geisel, better known as Dr. Seuss, piano teacher Terwilliker tells his pupils that he will "make a Paderewski" out of them.

Two music festivals honouring Paderewski are held in the United States, both in November. The first has been organised each year since 1993, in Paso Robles, California. The second has been held since 2014 in Raleigh, North Carolina.

The facade of White Eagle Hall, in Jersey City, New Jersey, is adorned with busts of Polish heroes Ignacy Jan Paderewski, Casimir Pulaski, Tadeusz Kościuszko and Henryk Sienkiewicz.

A plaque honoring Paderewski can be found in Chicago's Wicker Park, near the park's fieldhouse. It was in the Wicker Park neighborhood that Paderewski had his headquarters during World War I. The memorial notes that he was declared an honorary citizen of Chicago in 1932.

=== Honours and awards ===
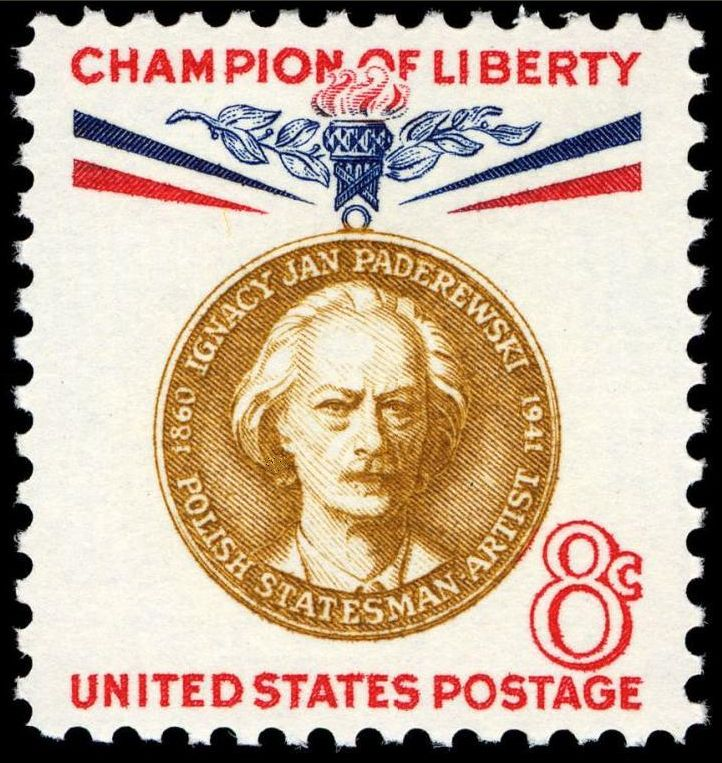
United States commemorative stamp honoring Paderewski 1960 issue 4-cent version

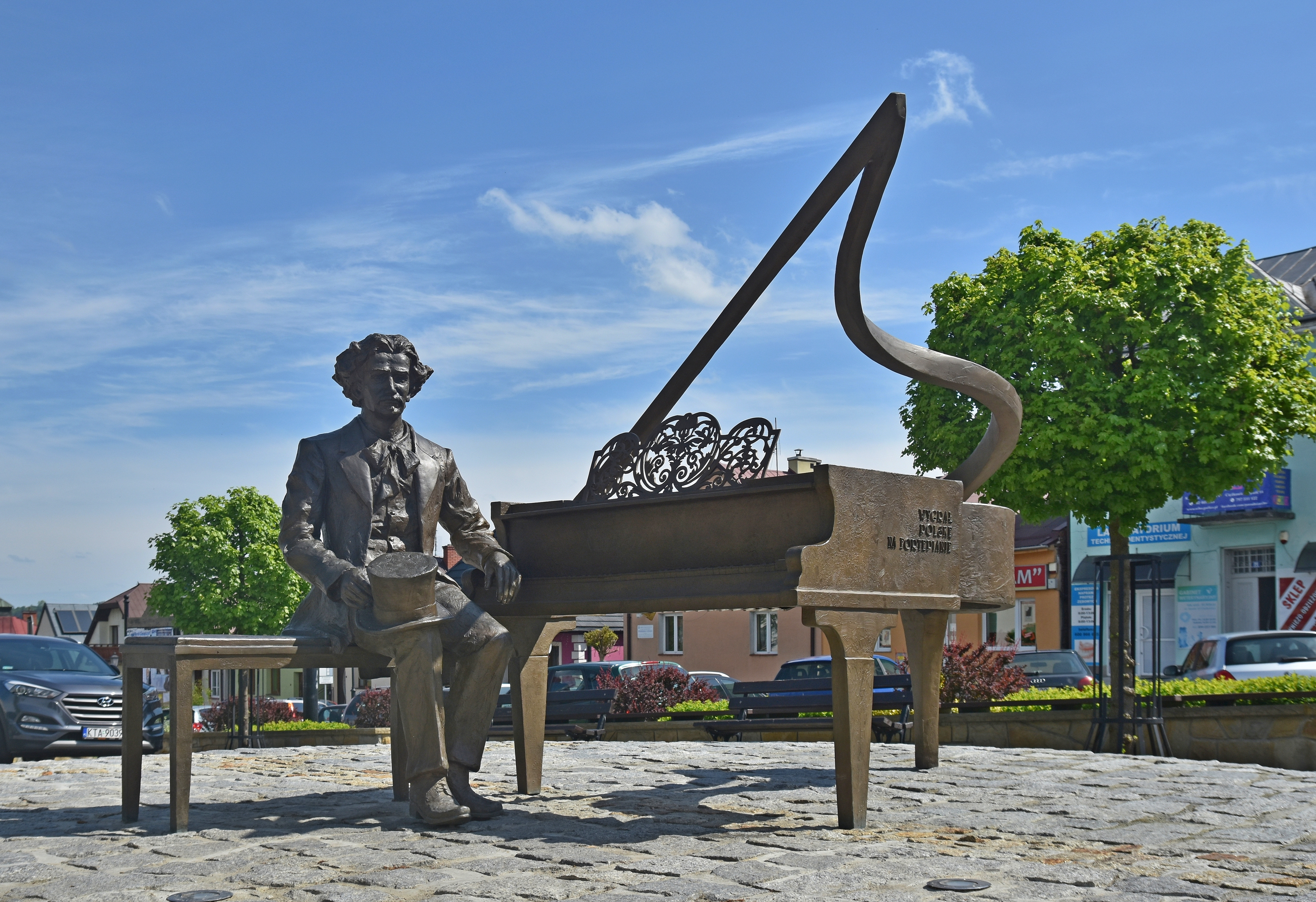
Paderewski monument in Ciężkowice

The Academy of Music in Poznań is named after Paderewski, and many major cities in Poland have streets and schools named after him. Streets are also named after him in Perth Amboy, New Jersey, and Buffalo, New York. Since 1960, Paderewski has had a star on the Hollywood Walk of Fame in Los Angeles.

- Order of the White Eagle (Poland, 1921)
- Order of Virtuti Militari, Silver Cross (posthumous) (Poland, 1941)
- Order of Polonia Restituta, Grand Cross (Poland, 1923)
- Legion of Honour, Grand Cross, (France, 1929)
- Order of the Crown, (Romania, 1889)
- Albert Order, (Saxony, 1895)
- Order of Saints Maurice and Lazarus (Italy, 1925)
- Order of the Crown of Italy
- Order of Charles III, (Spain, 1902)
- Order of Leopold, (Belgium, 1924)
- Honorary Knight Grand Cross of the Order of the British Empire (British Empire, 1925)
- Honorary doctorates from the Lviv University (1912), Yale University (1917), Jagiellonian University (1919), Oxford University (1920), Columbia University (1922), University of Southern California (1923), Adam Mickiewicz University in Poznań (1924), University of Glasgow (1925), Cambridge University (1926), University of Warsaw (1931), the University of Lausanne (1933), and the New York University
- Honorary Citizen of Lviv, 1912
- Honorary Citizen of Warsaw, 1919
- Honorary Citizen of Poznań, 1920
- Honorary Studentenverbindung Patria
- Royal Philharmonic Society Gold Medal
- Academic Golden Laurel of the Polish Academy of Literature for oratory
- Honorary member of the Royal Academy of Music, (British Empire, 1892)

On 8 October 1960, the United States Post Office Department released two stamps commemorating Ignacy Jan Paderewski. Poland also honored him with postage stamps on at least three occasions.

== See also ==
- History of Poland (1918–1939)
- List of honorary British knights and dames
- List of Polish composers
