= Mila Rodino =

National anthem of Bulgaria

English: Dear Motherland
- Мила Родино
- National anthem of Bulgaria
- Lyrics: Tsvetan Radoslavov, 1885
- Music: Tsvetan Radoslavov, 1885
- Adopted: 8 September 1964 (by the People's Republic of Bulgaria); 18 May 1971 (reaffirmed in the Zhivkov Constitution); 10 November 1989 (by Bulgaria)
- Readopted: 12 July 1991 (reaffirmed in the Constitution of Bulgaria)

Audio sample
- Official orchestral and vocal recording in A minor: file; help

"Mila Rodino" (Bulgarian: Мила Родино, IPA: [ˈmiɫɐ ˈrɔdino]; lit. 'Dear Motherland') is the national anthem of Bulgaria. It was composed and written by Tsvetan Radoslavov as he left to fight in the Serbo-Bulgarian War in 1885. It was adopted in 1964. Its lyrics have been changed many times, most recently in 1990. On 12 July 1991, the anthem was shortened to its first verse along with the chorus.

Between 1886 and 1947, "Šumi Marica" was used as the Bulgarian national anthem; between 1947 and 1951, the march "Republiko naša, zdravej!" was used and from 1951 to 1964, "Bǎlgarijo Mila" was used.

== History ==
U.S. Navy Band instrumental rendition in F minor

=== Creation ===
The song was created by scientist and composer Tsvetan Radoslavov in 1885, after his participation in the Serbo-Bulgarian War. He was inspired to create the song based on his poems when he saw Serbian students singing their own patriotic song on their journey home. It was first printed in 1895 in Part I of "Music Textbook" by K. Mahan.

=== Adoption ===
In the 1960s, after the de-Stalinization process, the poet Georgi Dzhagarov began an effort to replace the previous anthem, which was based on the State Anthem of the Soviet Union and included references to Joseph Stalin. After discussing with Todor Zhivkov, General Secretary Zhivkov accepted the idea. On 29 March 1962, the Council of Ministers held a competition for the lyrics and the music for the new anthem, with the deadline for the submission of lyrics on 1 May 1963 and the music on 1 November 1963. The committee for the new anthem was selected by Zhivkov himself. The lyrics for the new anthem were finalized on 1 September 1963, and the music was finalized on 1 March 1964. The Council of Ministers also drew up a panel of experts to look at the projects submitted in advance and to put the best of the proposals to discussion amongst the committee.

After the proposals for the lyrics and the music were submitted, the committee was not satisfied, so they accepted the advice of Georgi Dzhagarov to use "Mila Rodino" as the music for the new anthem. The duty of composing lyrics was assigned to Georgi Dzhagarov and Dmitry Metodiev, while the melody of the anthem was revised with further harmonization by Philip Kutev and Alexander Raichev.

Under Zhivkov's orders, Georgi Dzhagarov and Dimitar Metodiev resided in the Vrana Palace to compose the text of "Mila Rodino".

During the composition of the lyrics, Georgi Dzhagarov was not particularly proud of his creation. He preferred the anthem without the mentions of the Soviet Union and the leadership of the Bulgarian Communist Party in the third verse of the anthem. An alternate version of the third verse can be found in Dzhagarov's manuscript.

Дружно, братя българи!
Греят нови върхове,
Знамето над нас се вее
и на подвиг ни зове.

Translation:

Together, Bulgarian brothers!
New pinnacles shine,
The flag flies above us
and calls us to heroic deeds.

The final composition of the lyrics consisted of the original first verse and the chorus of the anthem by Tsvetan Radoslavov, as well as two new verses: the second verse references the fight for Bulgarian independence and the fight against fascism during World War II, and the third verse references the Communist Party of the Soviet Union along with the Communist Party of Bulgaria.

In 1964, before the affirmation of "Mila Rodino" as the national anthem, the decision met resistance from Petko Staynov. Staynov argued that the melody is of Ashkenazi Jewish origin and this makes the song not suitable for being the anthem of Bulgaria. Dobri Hristov countered the argument, stating that there are hundreds of melodies in Bulgarian songs which are borrowed from other people and thus became an integral part of the Bulgarian musical heritage. This statement led to Staynov being removed from the committee for the new anthem by Todor Zhivkov.

On 8 September 1964, "Mila Rodino" was finally affirmed by the Presidium of the National Assembly, with the Decree No. 534, as the national anthem of Bulgaria. The first performance of the song as the national anthem of Bulgaria took place on 9 September 1964, the 20th anniversary of the Socialist Revolution of 9 September.

== Proposals ==
During the discussion for the new constitution of Bulgaria in the 7th Grand National Assembly, there are some proposals submitted for a new anthem. The proposals include "Šumi Marica" and "Vǎrvi, narode vǎzrodeni".

The most recent one was the petition by writer Nikola Indzhov to change the anthem of Bulgaria to "Vǎrvi, narode vǎzrodeni", the anthem of the Bulgarian Enlightenment.

== Regulation ==
=== Current regulation ===
According to the Institutional Identity of the Administration of the State of Bulgaria, there are two versions of the anthem, the full and the abridged version.

==== Official version ====
- The official version of the anthem in an instrumental rendition for wind orchestra is performed by the Brass Orchestra of the National Guard.
- The official version of the anthem in an instrumental rendition for symphony orchestra is performed by the Bulgarian National Radio Symphony Orchestra.
- The official version of the anthem in a vocal version is performed by the Mixed Choir of the Bulgarian National Radio.

==== Performances ====
The anthem is to be played on the following occasions:

- the celebration of the Liberation Day on 3 March
- public holidays celebrating historical events and personalities
- ceremonies for raising the national flag
- state and official visits
- ceremonies for offering a wreath to the monument to the Unknown Soldier in Sofia
- diplomatic and military ceremonies
- other official events of national importance
- on the initiative of the state authorities
- and on local celebrations with a decision by the Municipal Council

The abridged version of the anthem can be played on the following occasions:

- cultural and sporting events
- beginning of the school year

The anthem of the Republic of Bulgaria can only be performed once a day, on the same ceremony.

==== Usage bans ====
The national anthem is not allowed to be used in advertising, with the exception of national campaigns taken by state authorities. The anthem cannot be used as part of another melody or song, nor to be remixed with different lyrics other than the legally established ones. Playing the national anthem inappropriately, including distorting the original music, is also forbidden.

=== Original regulation ===
The first regulation on the anthem came from Decree No. 534 "On the approval of the text and the music of the national anthem of the People's Republic of Bulgaria", which was published on 8 September 1964.

== Recordings ==
Several recordings and recorded versions of Bulgarian national anthems are documented in Bulgarian institutional and media sources. The archive of Bulgarian National Radio identifies recordings of earlier Bulgarian anthems, including Shumi Maritsa, Republiko nasha, zdravey, Balgariyo mila, zemya na geroi and Mila Rodino. In that archive, Shumi Maritsa is listed in a performance by the Mixed Choir and Symphony Orchestra of Bulgarian National Radio conducted by Metodi Matakiev, while Republiko nasha, zdravey, Balgariyo mila, zemya na geroi and Mila Rodino are listed in performances by the Bulgarian Choral Chapel "Svetoslav Obretenov" and the State Radio Orchestra.

In 2004, a new digital recording of Mila Rodino was made at Bulgaria Hall in Sofia. The recording featured the Sofia Philharmonic Orchestra, the Choral Chapel "Svetoslav Obretenov" and soloists Raina Kabaivanska, Nikola Ghiuselev, Roberta and Orlin Goranov, conducted by Nayden Todorov. The arrangement was by composer Tsenko Minkin. According to Bulgarian National Radio, the recording took place on 29 September 2004 and involved nearly 200 performers. The Bulgarian Chamber of Commerce and Industry also described the project for the creation and distribution of the new digital recording, listing the Sofia Philharmonic, the Choral Chapel "Svetoslav Obretenov", Kabaivanska, Ghiuselev, Todorov and Minkin among its participants.

In 2024, the Sofia Philharmonic Orchestra made a new digital recording of the Bulgarian national anthem under Nayden Todorov's direction. The recording was made together with a new version of the European anthem, Ode to Joy, and was announced as intended for free institutional use through the website of the Council of Ministers.

== Lyrics ==
=== Current official ===
The anthem currently officially consists of the first verse and chorus. During communist rule, two additional verses (II and III) were added that referred to Moscow (under direct instructions of Todor Zhivkov) and the Bulgarian Communist Party, as well as the fallen fighters for Bulgaria through the years. After the changes in 1989, this part of the anthem was removed and forbidden to be performed.

==== Bulgarian official ====
Cyrillic script

Горда Стара планина,
до ней Дунава синей,
слънце Тракия огрява,
над Пирина пламеней.

Припев:
(Родино) Мила Родино,
ти си земен рай,
твойта хубост, твойта прелест,
ах, те нямат край.

Паднаха борци безчет,
за народа наш любим,
майко, дай ни мъжка сила,
пътя им да продължим.

Припев

Latin script

Gorda Stara planina,
Do nej Dunava sinej,
Slǎnce Trakija ogrjava,
Nad Pirina plamenej.

Pripev:
(Rodino) Mila Rodino,
Ti si zemen raj,
Tvojta hubost, tvojta prelest,
Ah, te njamat kraj.

Padnaha borci bezčet,
Za naroda naš ljubim,
Majko, daj ni mǎžka sila,
Pǎtja im da prodǎlžim.

Pripev

IPA transcription (Note: See Help:IPA/Bulgarian and Bulgarian phonology.)

[ˈɡɔɾ.dɐ ˈsta.ɾɐ pɫɐ.niˈna |]
[ˈdɔ nɛj ˈdu.nɐ.ʋɐ siˈnɛj |]
[ˈsɫɤn.t͡sɛ ˈtɾa.ki.jɐ oˈgɾja.ʋɐ |]
[ˈnat ˈpi.ɾi.nɐ pɫɐ.mɛˈnɛj ǁ]

[ˈpɾi.pɛf]:
[(ˈrɔ.di.no) ˈmi.ɫɐ ˈrɔ.di.no |]
[ˈti si ˈzɛ.mɛn ˈraj |]
[ˈtʋɔj.tɐ ˈxu.bɔst | ˈtʋɔj.tɐ ˈpɾɛ.lɛst |]
[ˈax tɛ ˈɲa.mɐt ˈkɾaj ǁ]

[ˈpad.nɐ.xɐ boɾˈt͡si bɛsˈt͡ʃɛt |]
[zɐ nɐˈɾɔ.dɐ ˈnaʃ ʎuˈbim |]
[ˈmaj.ko ˈdaj ni ˈmɤʃ.kɐ ˈsi.ɫɐ |]
[ˈpɤ.tjɐ im dɐ pɾo.dəɫˈʒim ǁ]

[ˈpɾi.pɛf]

==== English translation ====
The proud Stara Planina,
Bluely the Danube shimmers.
The Sun shines over Thrace,
And over Pirin it blazes.

Chorus:
(Motherland) O dear Motherland,
You're earth's Promised Land,
Your beauty, your loveliness,
Ah, forever boundless.

For our people beloved,
Lives martyrs have sacrificed.
Mother, give us virile strength
For persevering their path.

Chorus

Translation:

=== Original version ===
==== Bulgarian original ====
Cyrillic script

Горда стара планина,
До ней север се синей
Слънце Витош позлатява
Към Цариград се белей.

Припев:
Мила Родино,
Ти си земен рай,
Твойта хубост, твойта прелест,
Ах, те нямат край.

Хайде братя българи,
Към Балкана да вървим.
Там се готви бой юнашки,
За свобода, правдини.

Припев

Родино мила, теб привет,
О, майко теб привет!
Теб Българийо чада сме,
Ти си наший дом свещен!

Припев

Ти си наший кът любим,
Кът за щастие отреден!
Мил си край незабравим,
С чудна прелест надарен!

Припев

Как щедро, майко, е
Земята твоя осеяна с брилянти!
Сред тях прекрасен свети
Балканът горд напет –

Припев

О, виж го как сияй!
Ний благоговеем пред него и пеем:

Припев

Latin script

Gorda Stara Planina,
Do nej sever se sinej.
Slǎnce Vitoš pozlatjava
Kǎm Carigrad se belej.

Pripev:
Mila Rodino,
Ti si zemen raj,
Tvojta hubost, tvojta prelest –
Ah, te njamat kraj.

Hajde bratja bǎlgari,
Kǎm Balkana da vǎrvim.
Tam se gotvi boj junaški,
Za svoboda, pravdini.

Pripev

Rodino mila, teb privet,
O, majko teb privet!
Teb Bǎlgarijo čada sme,
Ti si našij dom svešten!

Pripev

Ti si našij kǎt ljubim,
Kǎt za štastie otreden!
Mil si kraj nezabravim,
S čudna prelest nadaren!

Pripev

Kak štedro, majko, e
Zemjata tvoja osejana s briljanti!
Sred tjah prekrasen sveti
Balkanǎt gord napet –

Pripev

O, viž go kak sijaj!
Nij blagogoveem pred nego i peem:

Pripev

IPA transcription

[ˈɡɔɾ.dɐ ˈsta.ɾɐ pɫɐ.niˈna |]
[ˈdɔ nɛj ˈsɛ.ʋɛɾ sɛ siˈnɛj |]
[ˈsɫɤn.t͡sɛ ˈʋi.toʃ po.zɫɐˈtja.ʋɐ |]
[ˈkɤm ˈt͡sa.ɾi.gɾɐt sɛ bɛˈlɛj ǁ]

[ˈpɾi.pɛf]:
[(ˈrɔ.di.no) ˈmi.ɫɐ ˈrɔ.di.no |]
[ˈti si ˈzɛ.mɛn ˈraj |]
[ˈtʋɔj.tɐ ˈxu.bɔst | ˈtʋɔj.tɐ ˈpɾɛ.lɛst |]
[ˈax tɛ ˈɲa.mɐt ˈkɾaj ǁ]

[ˈxaj.dɛ ˈbɾa.tjɐ ˈbɤɫ.gɐ.ɾi |]
[ˈkɤm bɐɫˈka.nɐ da ʋəɾˈʋim |]
[ˈtam sɛ ˈgɔ.tʋi ˈbɔj juˈnaʃ.ki |]
[zɐ sʋo.boˈda pɾɐʋˈdi.ni ǁ]

[ˈpɾi.pɛf]

[ˈrɔ.di.no ˈmi.ɫɐ ˈtɛp pɾiˈʋɛt |]
[ˈɔ ˈmaj.ko ˈtɛp pɾiˈʋɛt |]
[ˈtɛb bɐɫˈɡa.ɾi.jo ˈt͡ʃa.dɐ smɛ |]
[ˈti si ˈna.ʃij ˈdɔm sʋɛˈʃtɛn ǁ]

[ˈpɾi.pɛf]

[ˈti si ˈna.ʃij ˈkɤt ʎuˈbim |]
[ˈkɤt zɐ ˈʃta.sti.ɛ oˈtɾɛ.dɛn |]
[ˈmiɫ si ˈkɾaj nɛ.zɐ.bɾɐˈʋim |]
[s‿ˈt͡ʃud.nɐ ˈpɾɛ.lɛst nɐˈda.ɾɛn ‖]

[ˈpɾi.pɛf]

[ˈkak ˈʃtɛ.dɾo ˈmaj.ko ɛ |]
[zɛˈmja.tɐ ˈtʋɔ.jɐ o.sɛˈja.nɐ z‿bɾiˈʎan.ti |]
[sɾɛt ˈtjax pɾɛˈkɾa.sɛn ˈsʋɛ.ti |]
[bɐɫˈka.nət ˈɡɔɾt nɐˈpɛt ‖]

[ˈpɾi.pɛf]

[ˈɔ ˈʋiʒ go ˈkak siˈjaj |]
[ˈnij bɫɐ.ɡo.ɡoˈʋɛːm ˈpɾɛt ˈnɛ.ɡo i ˈpɛːm ‖]

[ˈpɾi.pɛf]

==== English translation ====
Thy proud Stara Planina,
Bluely the North flows by it.
The holy Sun gilds Vitosha,
Whitening Tsargrad towards it.

Chorus:
O dear Motherland,
You're earth's Promised Land.
Your beauty, your loveliness,
Ah, forever boundless.

Off we go – Bulgarian kins,
Toward the Balkan Mountains.
There a heroic battle arrives,
For freedom and for justice.

Chorus

Dear Motherland, be greeted,
Mother, may you be greeted.
Bulgaria, your children we are,
Our sacred home you are.

Chorus

You are our playground cherished,
You are for happiness destined.
An unforgettable country,
Endowed with wondrous beauty.

Chorus

How generous is Mother,
This land abounds in diamonds.
Surrounded by beautiful lights,
The Balkans now proudly rise.

Chorus

O, look how it shines!
Before it, we reverence and chant:

Chorus

Translation:

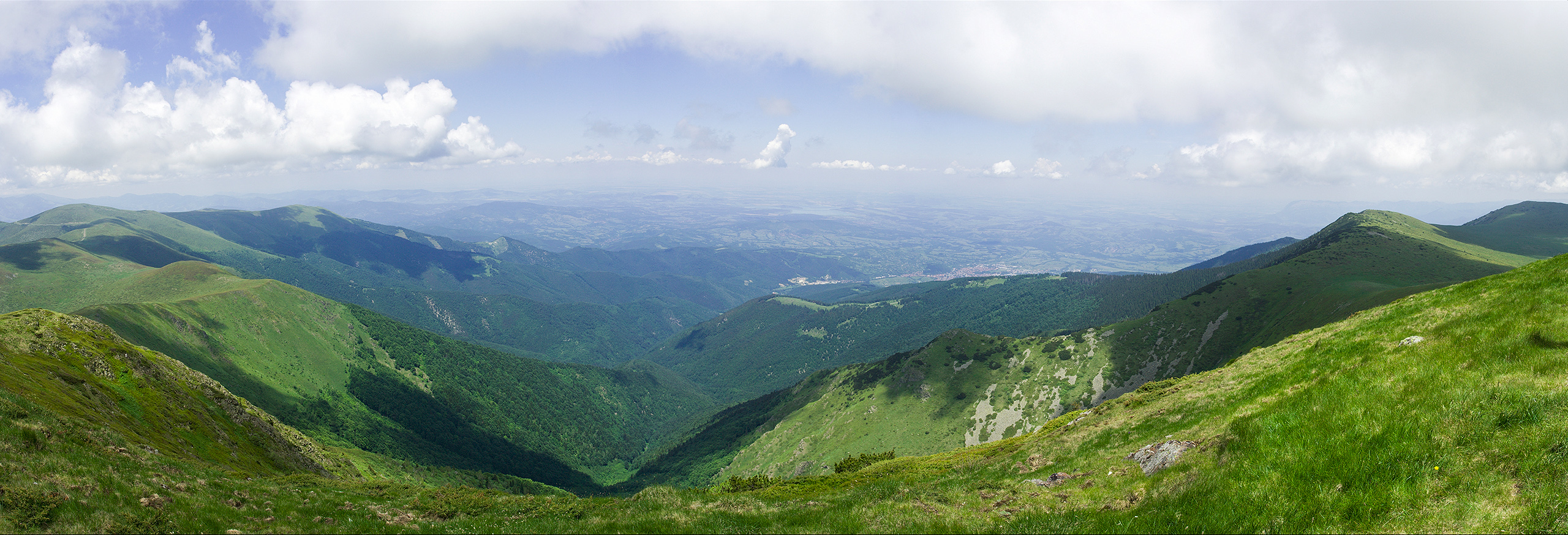
Proud Stara Planina...

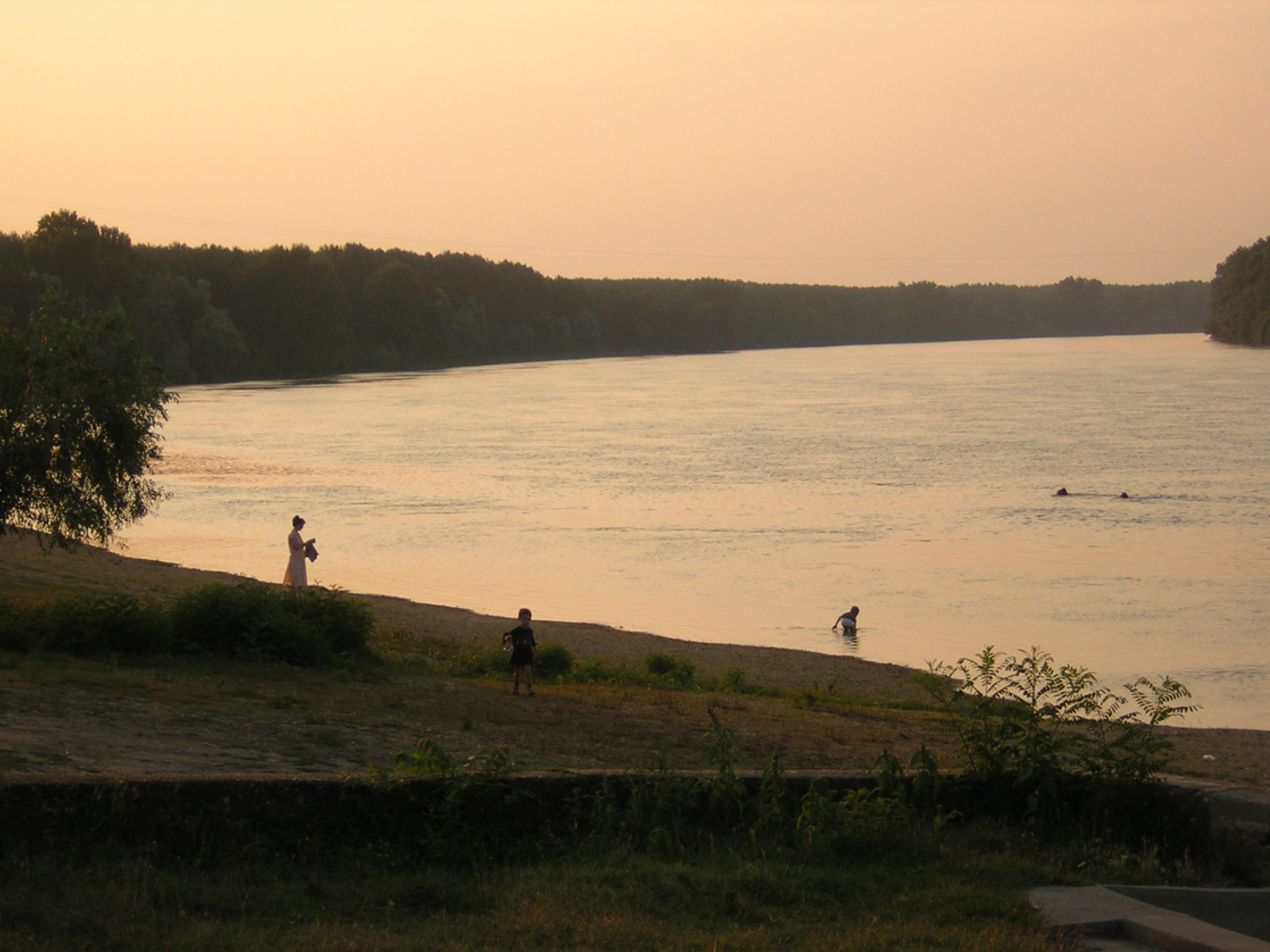
... to it the Danube flows in blue...

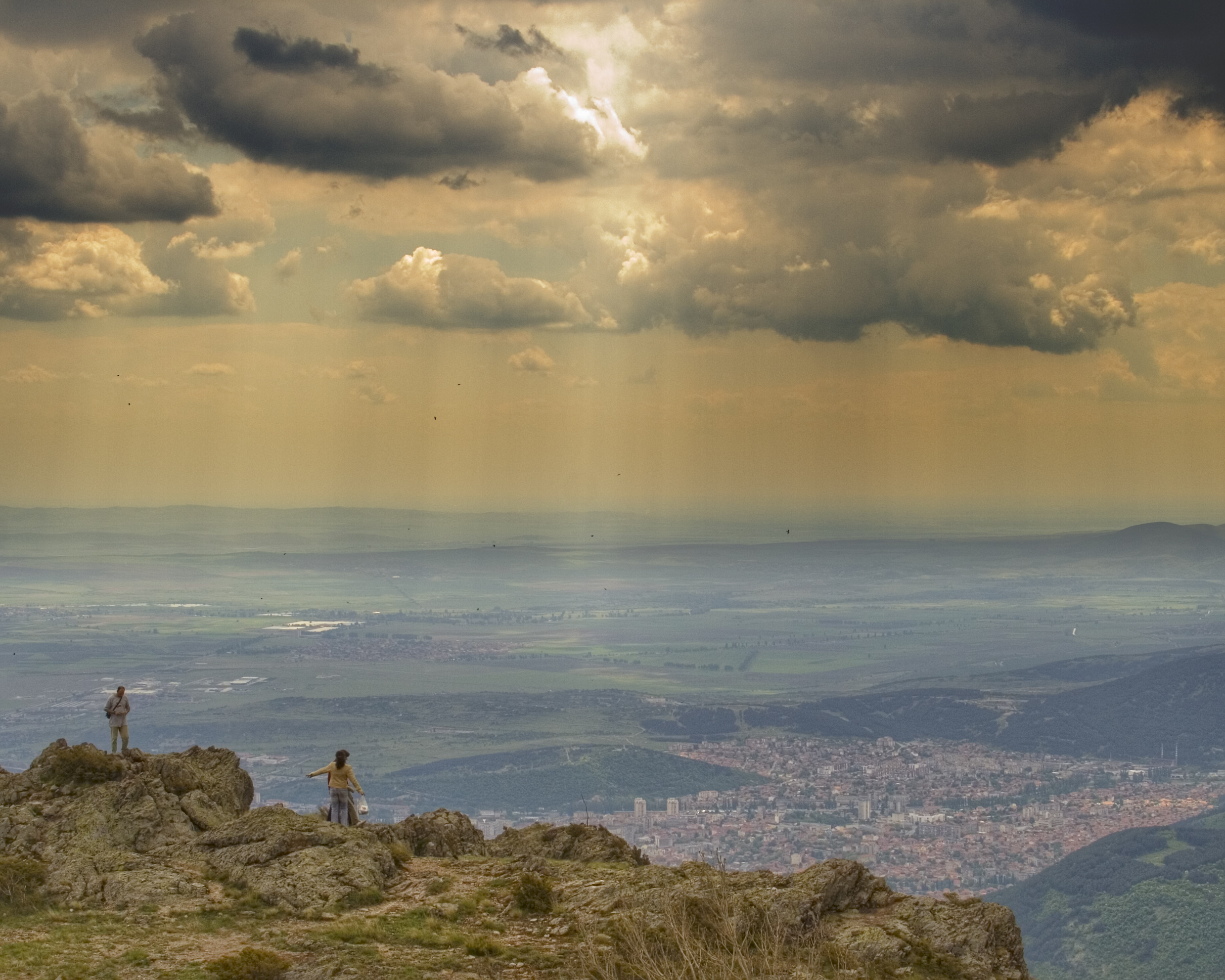
... the sun warms Thrace...

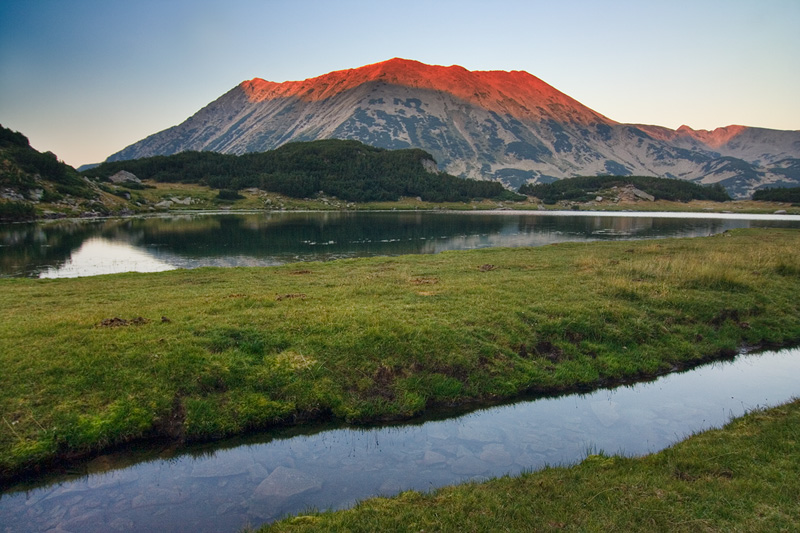
... over Pirin it blazes.

=== Other versions ===
Another version of the lyrics was published by composer Dobri Hristov. It was published in the Rodina collection, by the Publishing of the Bulgarian-Mohammedian Cultural and Enlightenment Friendship, in the town of Smolyan.

Original Cyrillic

Горда Стара-планина.
Надъ ней северъ синей,
До ней Витошъ възвишава
Гордо свойтѣ раменѣ

Припев:
Мила Родино,
Ти си земенъ рай!
Твойта хубость, твойта прелесть,
Ахъ, тѣ нѣматъ край!

Гордо Дунавътъ се лѣй!
Свойта пѣсень тихо пѣй!
Вѣченъ споменъ той за Ботевъ
Отъ гърди си ще лелѣй!

Припев

Чуй Марица, какъ шуми,
И съсъ радость си мълви,
Че тамъ, дето кърви бѣха
— Днесъ тамъ розата цъвти!

Припев

Current orthography

Горда Стара-планина.
Над ней север се синей,
До ней Витош възвишава
Гордо свойте рамене

Припев:
Мила Родино,
Ти си земен рай!
Твойта хубост, твойта прелест,
Ах, те нямат край!

Гордо Дунавът се лей!
Свойта песен тихо пей!
Вечен спомен той за Ботев
От гърди си ще лелей!

Припев

Чуй Марица, как шуми,
И със радост си мълви,
Че там, дето кърви беха
— Днес там розата цъвти!

Припев

==== Old socialist lyrics ====
Cyrillic script

Горда Стара планина,
до ней Дунава синей,
слънце Тракия огрява,
над Пирина пламеней.

Припев:
(Родино) Мила Родино,
ти си земен рай,
твойта хубост, твойта прелест,
ах, те нямат край.

Паднаха борци безчет,
за народа наш любим,
майко, дай ни мъжка сила,
пътя им да продължим.

Припев

Дружно, братя българи!
С нас Москва е в мир и в бой!
Партия велика води
нашия победен строй.

Припев

Latin script

Gorda Stara planina,
Do nej Dunava sinej,
Slǎnce Trakija ogrjava,
Nad Pirina plamenej.

Pripev:
(Rodino) Mila Rodino,
Ti si zemen raj,
Tvojta hubost, tvojta prelest,
Ah, te njamat kraj.

Padnaha borci bezčet,
Za naroda naš ljubim,
Majko, daj ni mǎžka sila,
Pǎtja im da prodǎlžim.

Pripev

Družno, bratja bǎlgari!
S nas Moskva e v mir i v boj!
Partija velika vodi
Našija pobeden stroj.

Pripev

IPA transcription

[ˈɡɔɾ.dɐ ˈsta.ɾɐ pɫɐ.niˈna |]
[ˈdɔ nɛj ˈdu.nɐ.ʋɐ siˈnɛj |]
[ˈsɫɤn.t͡sɛ ˈtɾa.ki.jɐ oˈgɾja.ʋɐ |]
[ˈnat ˈpi.ɾi.nɐ pɫɐ.mɛˈnɛj ǁ]

[ˈpɾi.pɛf]:
[(ˈrɔ.di.no) ˈmi.ɫɐ ˈrɔ.di.no |]
[ˈti si ˈzɛ.mɛn ˈraj |]
[ˈtʋɔj.tɐ ˈxu.bɔst | ˈtʋɔj.tɐ ˈpɾɛ.lɛst |]
[ˈax tɛ ˈɲa.mɐt ˈkɾaj ǁ]

[ˈpad.nɐ.xɐ boɾˈt͡si bɛsˈt͡ʃɛt |]
[zɐ nɐˈɾɔ.dɐ ˈnaʃ ʎuˈbim |]
[ˈmaj.ko ˈdaj ni ˈmɤʃ.kɐ ˈsi.ɫɐ |]
[ˈpɤ.tjɐ im dɐ pɾo.dəɫˈʒim ǁ]

[ˈpɾi.pɛf]

[ˈdɾuʒ.no ˈbɾa.tjɐ ˈbɤɫ.gɐ.ɾi ǁ]
[s‿ˈnas moˈskʋa ɛ ʋ‿ˈmiɾ i ʋ‿ˈbɔj ǁ]
[ˈpaɾ.ti.jɐ ʋɛˈli.kɐ ˈʋɔ.di]
[ˈna.ʃi.jɐ poˈbɛ.dɛn ˈstɾɔj ǁ]

[ˈpɾi.pɛf]

== Sheet music ==
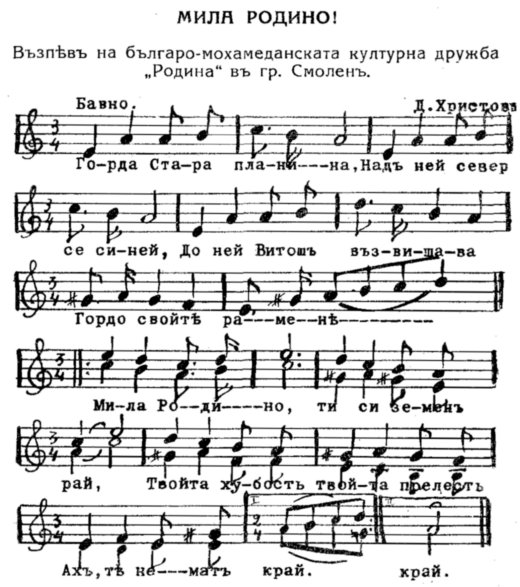
The sheet music of the alternate lyrics by Dobri Hristov.

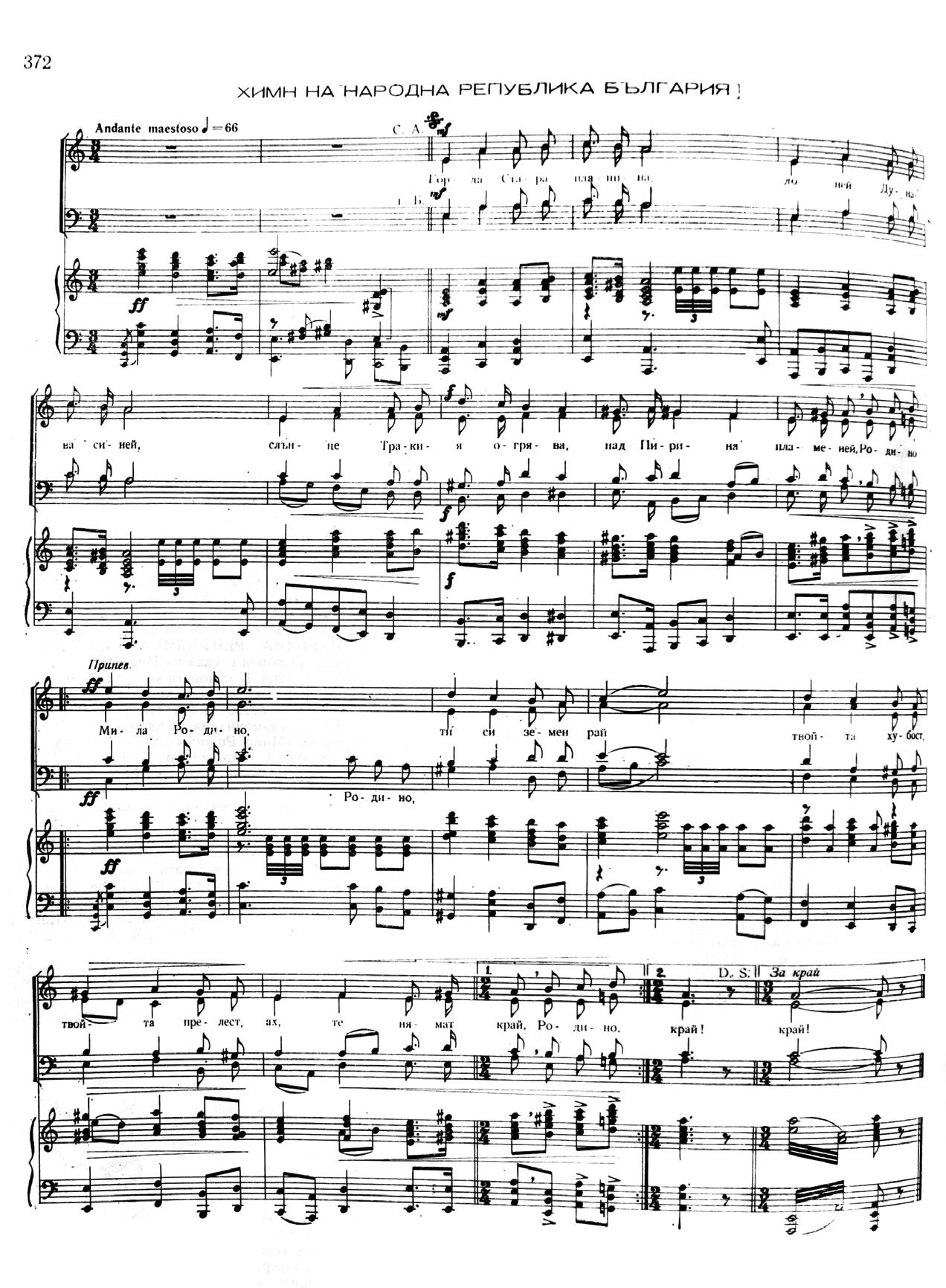
Vocal sheet music

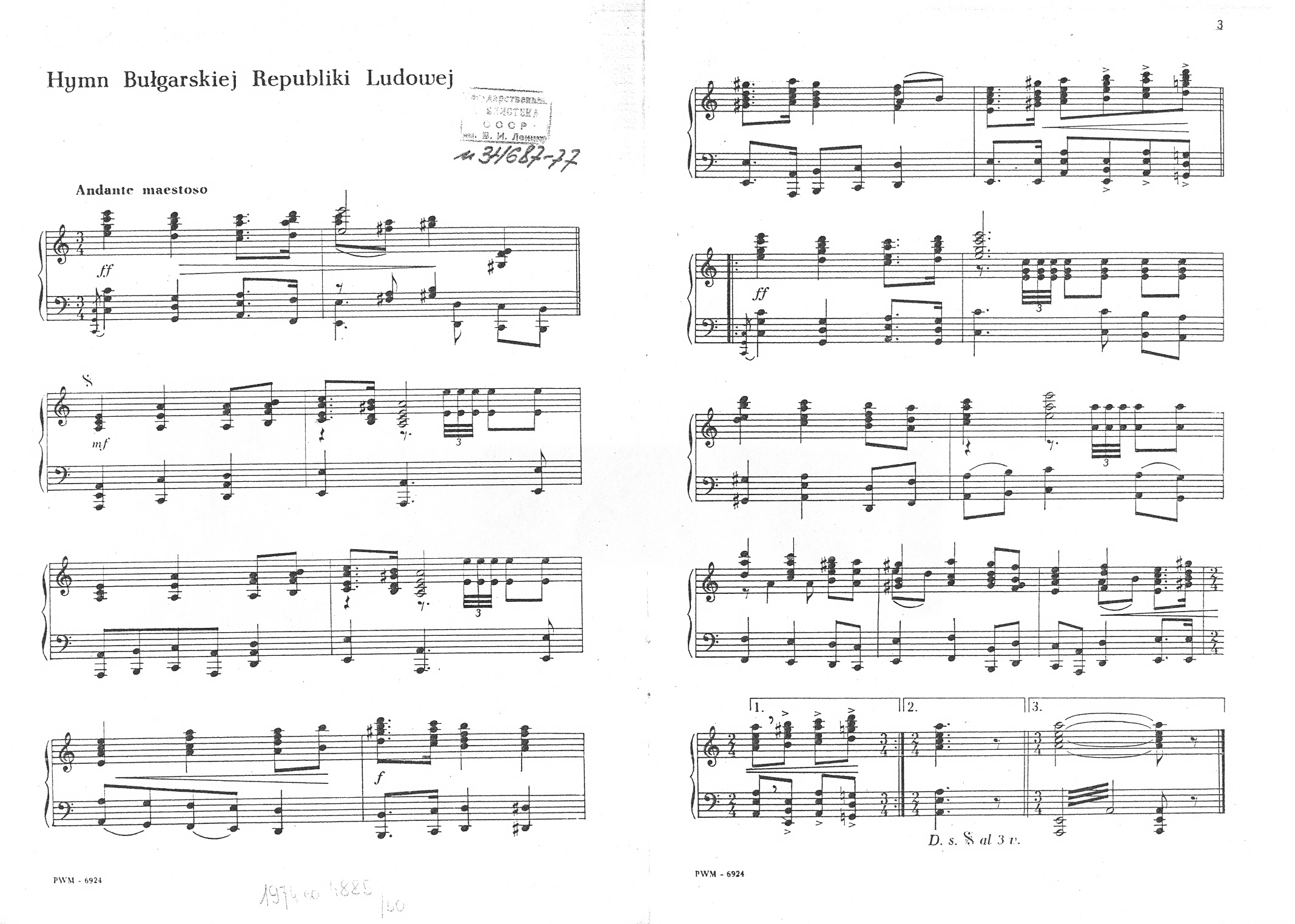
Instrumental sheet music

Vectorized sheet music

== See also ==
- Coat of arms of Bulgaria
- Flag of Bulgaria
- National Guards Unit of Bulgaria
