= Dear Bulgaria =

Former national anthem of Bulgaria

Himn na Narodna Republika Bŭlgariya
English: Anthem of the People's Republic of Bulgaria
- Химн на Народна Република България; Българийо мила
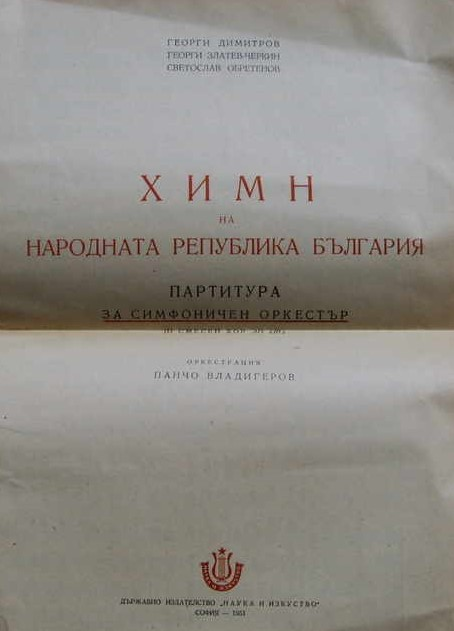
- Former national anthem of the People's Republic of Bulgaria (1951–64)
- Also known as: Българийо мила (English: "Dear Bulgaria")
- Lyrics: Nikola Furnadzhiev; Mladen Isaev; Elisaveta Bagriana, 18 May 1950
- Music: Georgi Dimitrov; Georgi Zlatev-Cherkin; Svetoslav Obretenov, 30 December 1950
- Adopted: 1 January 1951
- Relinquished: 8 September 1964
- Preceded by: Our Republic, Hail!
- Succeeded by: Mila Rodino

Audio sample
- Dear Bulgaria: file; help

The Anthem of the People's Republic of Bulgaria, (Note: Bulgarian: Химн на Народната Република България, romanized: Himn na Narodnata Republika Bŭlgariya) also unofficially known as "Dear Bulgaria", (Note: Bulgarian: Българийо мила, romanized: Bŭlgariyo mila) was the national anthem of Bulgaria from 1951 until 1964.

== History ==
On 20 February 1949, a contest for the new anthem of the People's Republic of Bulgaria was announced. According to the requirements of the organizers, it should in a simple, tight and exciting form reflect the most characteristic of the historical development of the Bulgarian people. The text should be simple, clear and smooth, "as inspirational, as wise as poetic as it is political." In its content, the heroic struggles of the Bulgarian people for liberation, the majestic and unexpected glories of Hristo Botev and Vasil Levski, as well as the other fighters fallen for freedom, have to be emphasized. It is explicitly emphasized that reflection was to find the Ninth of September as the beginning of a new era. Reflection requirements are to show "the love of the people to the homeland, the praise of its beauty, its determination to fight, to work affectionately for its glory and prosperity, its readiness for all sacrifices for freedom and independence, and friendship with the Soviet Union."

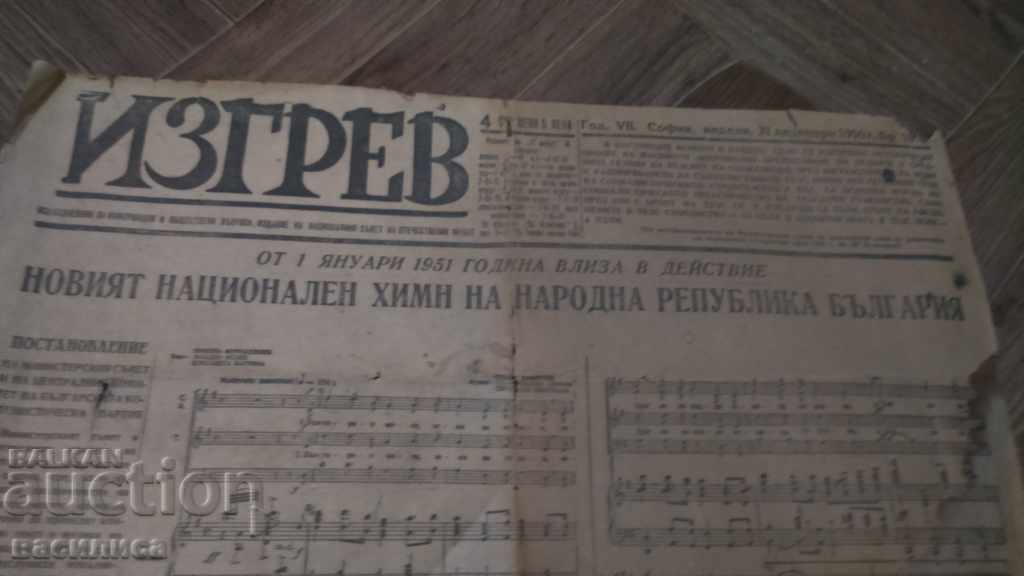
The new national anthem of the People's Republic of Bulgaria that was effective from January 1, 1951.

In March 1949, a special commission reviewed the submitted proposals. Thirty-one proposals were picked to be published in the periodic press for a nationwide discussion. The proposals was published on 23 March 1949. Among the authors were Elisaveta Bagryana, Mladen Isaev, Ivan Rudnykov, Nikolay Marangozov, Aleksandar Gerov, Mihail Lakatnik. According to the commission, none of these poems meet all the requirements, which is why the poets Bagryana, Isaev and Nikola Furnadzhiev were assigned to compose a final version. The work proceeded until 18 May 1950, when the text was finally ready and approved by the Council of Ministers. The next day, the Committee on Science, Art and Culture announced a contest for the creation of a melody. On 30 December 1950, the Presidium of the National Assembly issued Decree No. 688, which came into force on 1 January 1951, which affirmed the song as the new anthem of the People's Republic of Bulgaria.

The lyrics of the 1951 anthem closely resembled the State Anthem of the Soviet Union, and is entirely written according to the canons of Stalin's times. The rejection of the cult of personality of Stalin and attempts to democratize the Soviet system in the early 1960s led to the discourse of the replacement of the anthem. This prompted poet Georgi Dzhagarov to begin an effort to replace the anthem. His polemic reached Todor Zhivkov, leader of the People's Republic of Bulgaria, and soon, Zhivkov held a dialog with Dzagarov about the replacement of the anthem. On 29 March 1962, the Council of Ministers of Bulgaria announced a competition for writing of texts and music, with the deadline for the submission of the project on 1 May 1963. This resulted in "Bǎlgarijo mila" being relinquished, and "Mila Rodino" was subsequently affirmed as the new national anthem on 8 September 1964.

== Lyrics ==
Bulgarian original

Българийо мила, земя на герои,
Неспирен и мощен е твоят възход.
Да крепне навеки съюзът ни боен
С могъщия братски съветски народ!

Припев:
Слава, Републико наша свободна!
𝄆 Страж на мира непреклонно бъди!
Враг ли нападне земята ни родна,
В бой до победа ни смело води! 𝄇

Великото слънце на Ленин и Сталин,
С лъчите си нашия път освети.
Димитров за подвиг сърцата запали,
В борбата и в мирния труд ни сплоти.

Припев

Строим ний заводи, разкриваме мини,
Нивята широки задружно орем.
За нашата скъпа, прекрасна родина
Готови сме труд и живот да дадем!

Припев

Romanization of Bulgarian

Bŭlgariyo mila, zemya na geroi,
Nespiren i moshten e tvoyat vŭzhod.
Da krepne naveki sŭyuzŭt ni boen
S mogŭshtiya bratski sŭvetski narod.

Pripev:
Slava, Republiko nasha svobodna!
𝄆 Strazh na mira nepreklonno bŭdi!
Vrag li napadne zemyata ni rodna,
V boj do pobeda ni smelo vodi! 𝄇

Velikoto slŭnce na Lenin i Stalin,
S lŭchite si nashiya pŭt osveti.
Dimitrov za podvig sŭrcata zapali,
V borbata i mirniya trud ni sploti.

Pripev

Stroim ni zavodi, razkrivame mini,
Nivyata shiroki zadruzhno orem.
Za nashata skŭpa, prekrasna rodina
Gotovi sme trud i zhivot da dadem.

Pripev

English translation

Dear Bulgaria, land of heroes,
Your rise is unceasing and powerful.
May our alliance grow stronger forever
With the mighty fraternal Soviet people!

Chorus:
Glory, our free Republic!
Be an unyealing guardian of peace!
Should an enemy attack our native land,
In battle to victory, boldly lead us!

How great is the sun of our Lenin and Stalin,
Whose unequalled splendour throws light on our way!
The hearts which Dimitrov has fired are flaming
In struggle and work with so dazzling a ray!

Chorus

We’re digging our mines, we are working and building,
We’re tilling in common the large tract of soil.
Our country, our beautiful country thus serving
With all that we have, with our lives and our toil.

Chorus

== Similarity to the anthem of the Soviet Union ==
The lyrics of the anthem was entirely written according to the music of Stalin's times. The melody and the lyrics of the anthem were heavily influenced by the State Anthem of the Soviet Union. A brief comparison of the translation of both of the anthem proves this :

Anthem of the Soviet Union
Balgariyo Mila

Sing to our Motherland, free and undying,
Bulwark of peoples in brotherhood strong!
Flag of the Soviets, Flag of the people,
From victory to victory lead us on!

Hail, our Republic, we sing to your glory!
May you forever be a true shield of peace!
But should an enemy storm o’er the country,
Lead us to battle, to glorious feats!

Through tempests the shadows of freedom have cheered us,
Along the new path where great Lenin did lead,
Be true to the people, thus Stalin has reared us,
Inspired us to labor and valorus deed.

How great is the sun of our Lenin and Stalin,
Whose unequalled splendour throws light on our way!
The hearts which Dimitrov has fired are flaming
In struggle and work with so dazzling a ray!

== Orchestral sheet music of the anthem ==
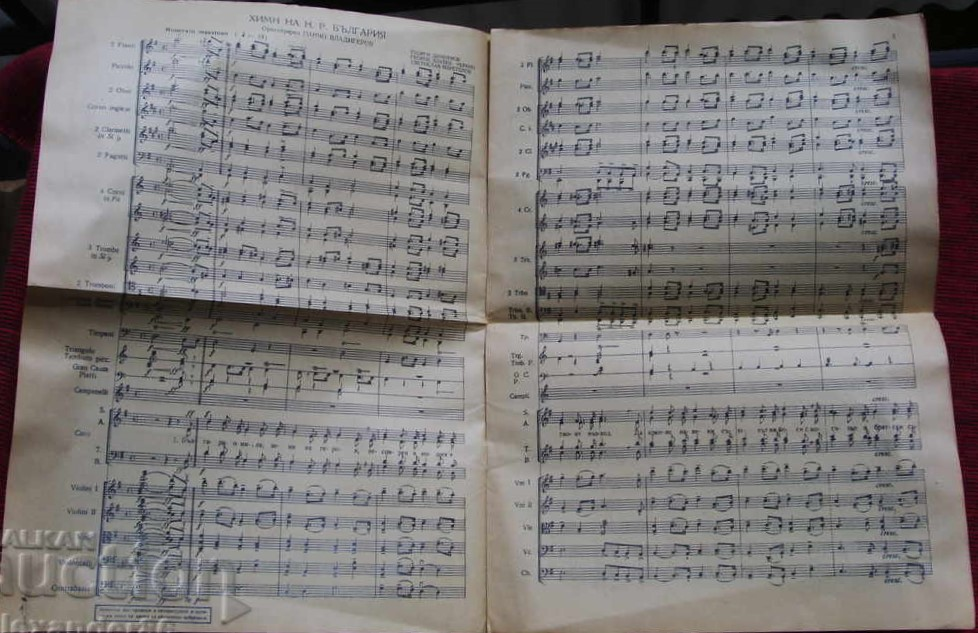
First page

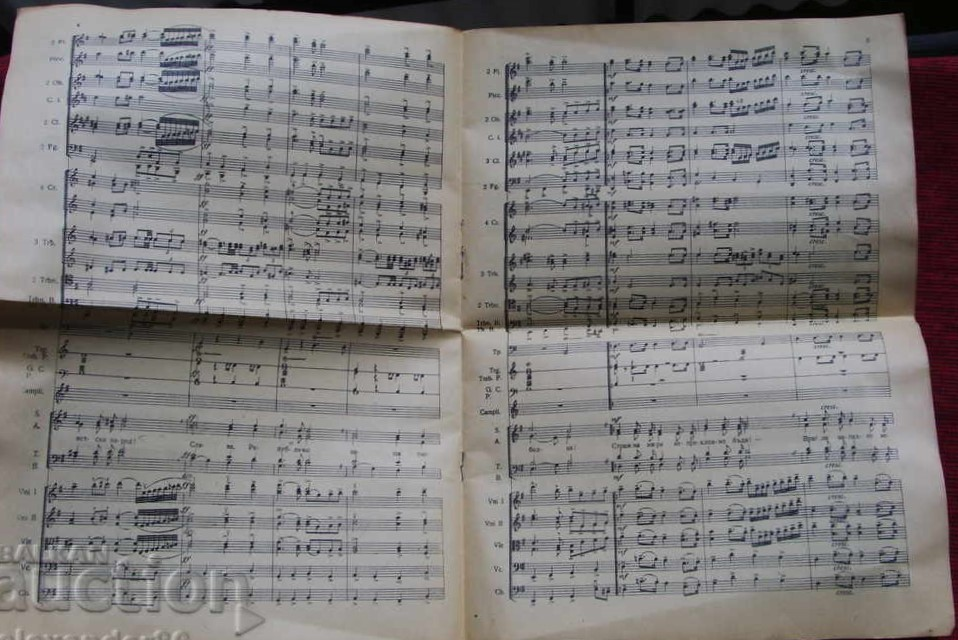
Second page
