= Tsvetan Radoslavov =

Bulgarian composer

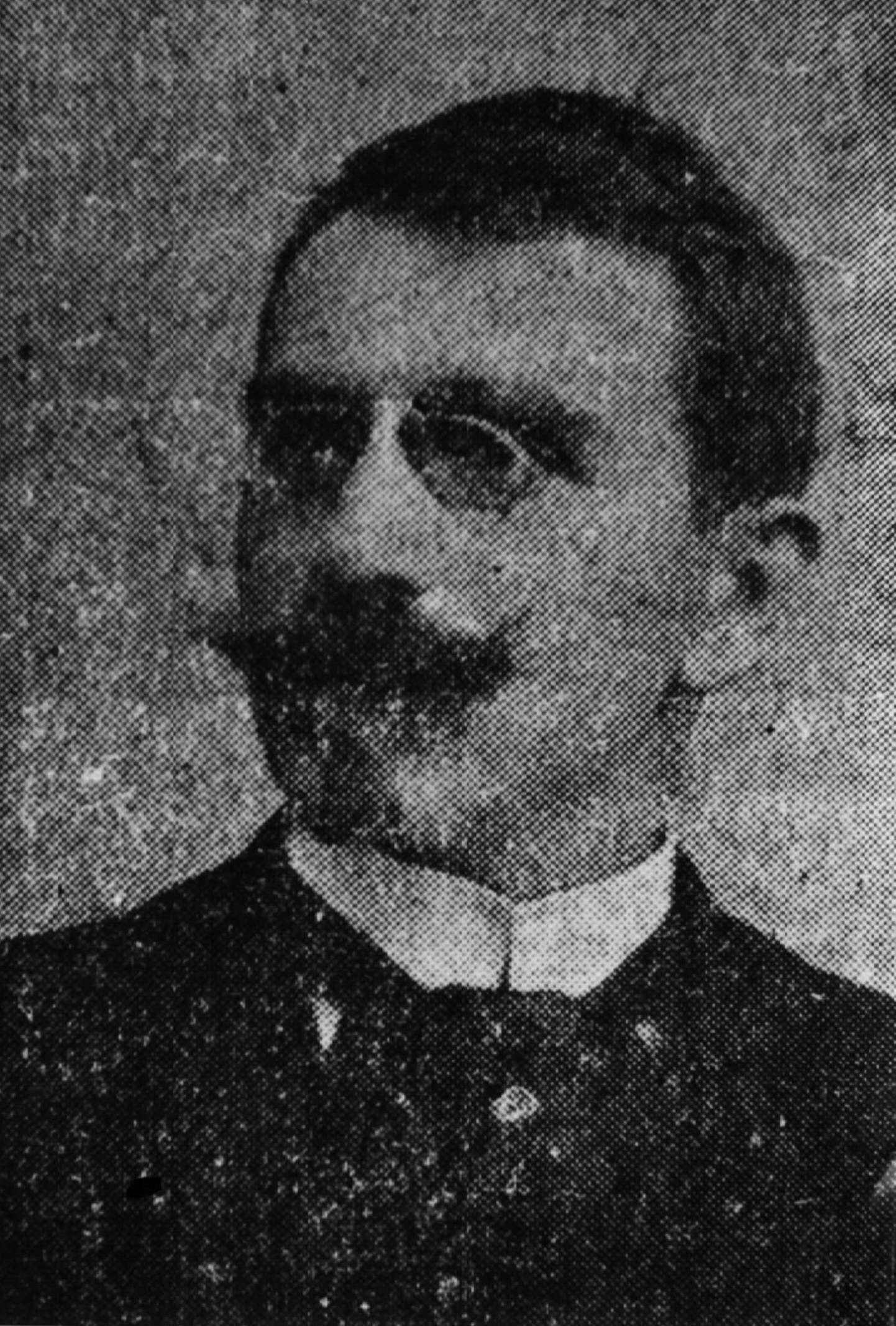
Tsvetan Radoslavov, 1912

Tsvetan Radoslavov Hadzhidenkov (Bulgarian: Цветан Радославов Хаджиденков; 1863–1931) was a Bulgarian educator, psychologist, public figure and the author of the song Gorda Stara Planina, which later became the current national anthem of Bulgaria, "Mila Rodino".

== Biography ==
Radoslavov was born in Svishtov in 1863. He came from families connected with the Bulgarian National Revival; his mother was related to the Pavlovich family, and he grew up in the household of Tsvyatko Radoslavov, whose surname he later used. He studied in Bulgaria before continuing his education abroad, including in Vienna and Leipzig. In Leipzig he studied philosophy and psychology and was associated with the intellectual circle of Wilhelm Wundt, one of the founders of modern experimental psychology.

In 1885, while travelling back to Bulgaria to volunteer in the Serbo-Bulgarian War, Radoslavov wrote the song Gorda Stara Planina ("Proud Old Mountain"). Bulgarian National Radio states that he composed it spontaneously in 1885 aboard the Austrian ship Maria Theresia, while travelling from Vienna to Bulgaria to take part in the war. The song was later revised and harmonised; an early musical treatment was made by Dobri Hristov in 1905.

After his studies abroad, Radoslavov returned to Bulgaria, rejecting opportunities to work in cities such as Vienna, Leipzig and Prague. He taught at the Third High School for Boys in Sofia, where he taught languages, psychology, ethics and logic. He was also active in Bulgarian cultural life: he worked for the development of Bulgarian theatre and opera, wrote reviews of productions at the National Theatre, authored plays, translated opera librettos and participated in the work of the Archaeological Society in Sofia. He also took part in efforts connected with the creation of a state music school in Sofia, later the National Music School "Lyubomir Pipkov".

Radoslavov lived in a small apartment at 3 Angel Kanchev Street in Sofia, where he is commemorated by a plaque by Georgi Chapkanov. He died on 27 October 1931 in Sofia, Tsardom of Bulgaria.

== Legacy ==
The song Gorda Stara Planina, written by Radoslavov in 1885, became the basis of the Bulgarian national anthem Mila Rodino. It was officially adopted as the national anthem of the People's Republic of Bulgaria on 8 September 1964, first performed as anthem on 9 September 1964, and reaffirmed as the national anthem of the Republic of Bulgaria by the Constitution of 1991.

In 2004, a new digital recording of Mila Rodino was made at Bulgaria Hall in Sofia. The recording featured the Sofia Philharmonic Orchestra, the Choral Chapel "Svetoslav Obretenov" and soloists Raina Kabaivanska, Nikola Ghiuselev, Roberta and Orlin Goranov, conducted by Nayden Todorov. The arrangement was by composer Tsenko Minkin. According to Bulgarian National Radio, the recording took place on 29 September 2004 and involved nearly 200 performers.
