= Petar Krumov =

Petar Krumov may refer to:

- Petar Krumov (composer)
- Petar Krumov (wrestler)
