= Radoslavov =

Radoslavov (Bulgarian: Радославов) is a Bulgarian masculine surname, its feminine counterpart is Radoslavova. It may refer to

- Tsvetan Radoslavov (1863–1931), Bulgarian teacher and author of national anthem
- Vasil Radoslavov (1854–1929), Bulgarian liberal politician
