= Petar Krumov (composer) =

Bulgarian conductor and composer (1934–2021)

Petar Krumov (Bulgarian: Петър Крумов; 6 August 1934 – 20 December 2021) was a Bulgarian composer, arranger and conductor.

== Biography ==
Krumov was born in Stara Zagora, Bulgaria on 6 August 1934. He studied choral conducting with Professor Georgi Dimitrov at the Pancho Vladigerov State Academy of Music (Sofia), from which he graduated in 1957. During his studies and as a result of the influence of Filip Kutev he became interested in Bulgarian folk music, which became his main field of work.

In 1957 he founded the Dobrudja Folk Ensemble, which he directed until 1982. He became then Director of the folk ensemble "Silistra", until 1988.

Krumov was a member of the jury in many folklore festivals, both International and Bulgarian. He received several awards, among them the Golden Medal at the National Folklore Competition (1959, 1964, 1969 and 1984). He was a holder of the Order of Saint Cyril and Saint Methodius II Rank. Krumov was also author of several books and articles on Bulgarian folklore and music.

Krumov died in Dobrich, Bulgaria on 20 December 2021, at the age of 87.
