= Anthem of the Bulgarian Enlightenment =

Official anthem of the Saints Cyril and Methodius' Day in Bulgaria

The "Anthem of the Bulgarian Enlightenment", (Note: Bulgarian: Химн на българската просвета, romanized: Himn na bǎlgarskata prosveta) also known as "Forward, People Reborn", (Note: Bulgarian: Върви, народе възродени, romanized: Vǎrvi, narode vǎzrodeni) is the official anthem of the Saints Cyril and Methodius' Day in Bulgaria. The lyrics of the song was based on a poem by Stoyan Mihaylovski.

== History ==
=== Creation of the lyrics ===
The song was based on a poem by a teacher on the French language at Rousse Gymnasium, Stoyan Mihaylovski. On 15 May 1892, he wrote the enthusiastic poem "Hymn of St. Cyril and Methodius", with the first verse "forward, people reborn". The song was published as a "Project for a Bulgarian All-Kind School Anthem" in the 9th until 10th issue of Misǎl Magazine and is dated to "Rousse, 1892 Aprile 15".

=== Creation of the music ===
In 1901, Panayot Pipkov, a music teacher at the Hunters School, was commissioned to write a new song that students would sing on the coming church day of Cyril and Methodius on 11 May. He still did not find the right text and was constantly postponing. On 9 May, Pipkov noticed that one of the boys was concentrating on reading a poem in his hour, taking his book and respecting it. Before it reached half the poem, the music for the ordered student song was already born in his head. He took the chalk and began to record the notes on the board. In 15 minutes, he composed the melody, and by the end of the class, his students studied and sung it.

== Dissemination ==
On 11 May 1901, the song was first performed in Lovech as a festive anthem for the praise of the work of Cyril and Methodius and the Bulgarian education. In 1902, for the Day of Bulgarian Education and Culture and the Slavonic Scripture, the song is littered and singing from all schools in the country.

After the communists took power, the obligatory ideological changes were brought about by the song. Some lines have been changed, couples have been removed, mentioning God and the apostles. Whole quotes are completely removed from readers.

It was not until the 1990s, after the democratic changes in the country, that the original text was restored. But traditionally the school holidays continue to perform the first 6 pairs of the 14 poems.

== Lyrics ==
Bulgarian original

Върви, народе възродени,
към светла бъднина върви,
с книжовността, таз сила нова,
съдбините си поднови!

Върви към мощната просвета!…
В световните борби върви
от длъжност неизменно воден —
и Бог ще те благослови!

Напред! Науката е слънце,
което във душите грей!
Напред! Народността не пада
там, дето знаньето живей!

Безвестен беше ти, безславен!…
О, влез в историята веч,
духовно покори страните,
които завладя със меч!

Тъй солунските двама братя
насърчваха дедите ни…
О, минало незабравимо,
о, пресвещени старини!

България остана вярна
на достославний тоз завет —
в тържествованье и в страданье
извърши подвизи безчет…

Да, ро̀дината ни години
пресветли преживя, в беда
неописуема изпадна,
но върши дългът си всегда!

Бе време, писмеността наша
кога обходи целий мир;
за всесветовната просвета
тя бе неизчерпаем вир;

бе и тъжовно робско време…
Тогаз балканский храбър син
навеждаше лице под гнета
на отоманский властелин…

Но винаги духът народен
подпорка търсеше у вас,
о, мъдреци!… През десет века
сé жив остана ваший глас!

О, вий, които цяло племе
извлякохте из мрътвина,
народен гений възкресихте —
заспал в глубока тъмнина;

подвижници за права вяра,
сеятели на правда, мир,
апостоли високославни,
звезди върху славянски мир,

бъдете преблагословени,
о вий, Методий и Кирил,
отци на българското знанье,
творци на наший говор мил!

Нек' името ви да живее
във всенародната любов,
речта ви мощна нек' се помни
в славянството во век веков!

Romanization of Bulgarian

Vǎrvi, narode vǎzrodeni,
kǎm svetla bǎdnina vǎrvi,
s knižovnostta, taz sila nova,
sǎdbinite si podnovi!

Vǎrvi kǎm moštnata prosveta!…
V svetovnite borbi vǎrvi
ot dlǎžnost neizmenno voden —
i Bog šte te blagoslovi!

Napred! Naukata e slǎnce,
koeto vǎv dušite grej!
Napred! Narodnostta ne pada
tam, deto znanjeto živej!

Bezvesten beše ti, bezslaven!…
O, vlez v istorijata več,
duhovno pokori stranite,
koito zavladja sǎs meč!

Tǎj solunskite dvama bratja
nasǎrčvaha dedite ni…
O, minalo nezabravimo,
o, presvešteni starini!

Bǎlgarija ostana vjarna
na dostoslavnij toz zavet —
v tǎržestvovanje i v stradanje
izvǎrši podvizi bezčet…

Da, ròdinata ni godini
presvetli preživja, v beda
neopisuema izpadna,
no vǎrši dǎlgǎt si vsegda!

Be vreme, pismenostta naša
koga obhodi celij mir;
za vsesvetovnata prosveta
tja be neizčerpaem vir;

be i tǎžovno robsko vreme…
Togaz balkanskij hrabǎr sin
naveždaše lice pod gneta
na otomanskij vlastelin…

No vinagi duhǎt naroden
podporka tǎrseše u vas,
o, mǎdreci!… Prez deset veka
sé živ ostana vašij glas!

O, vij, koito cjalo pleme
izvljakohte is mrǎtvina,
naroden genij vǎzkresihte —
zaspal v gluboka tǎmnina;

podvižnici za prava vjara,
sejateli na pravda, mir,
apostoli visokoslavni,
zvezdi vǎrhu slavjanski mir,

bǎdete preblagosloveni,
o vij, Metodij i Kiril,
otci na bǎlgarskoto znanje,
tvorci na našij govor mil!

Nek' imeto vi da živee
vǎv vsenarodnata ljubov,
rečta vi moštna nek' se pomni
v slavjanstvoto vo vek vekov!
