= Stoyan Mihaylovski =

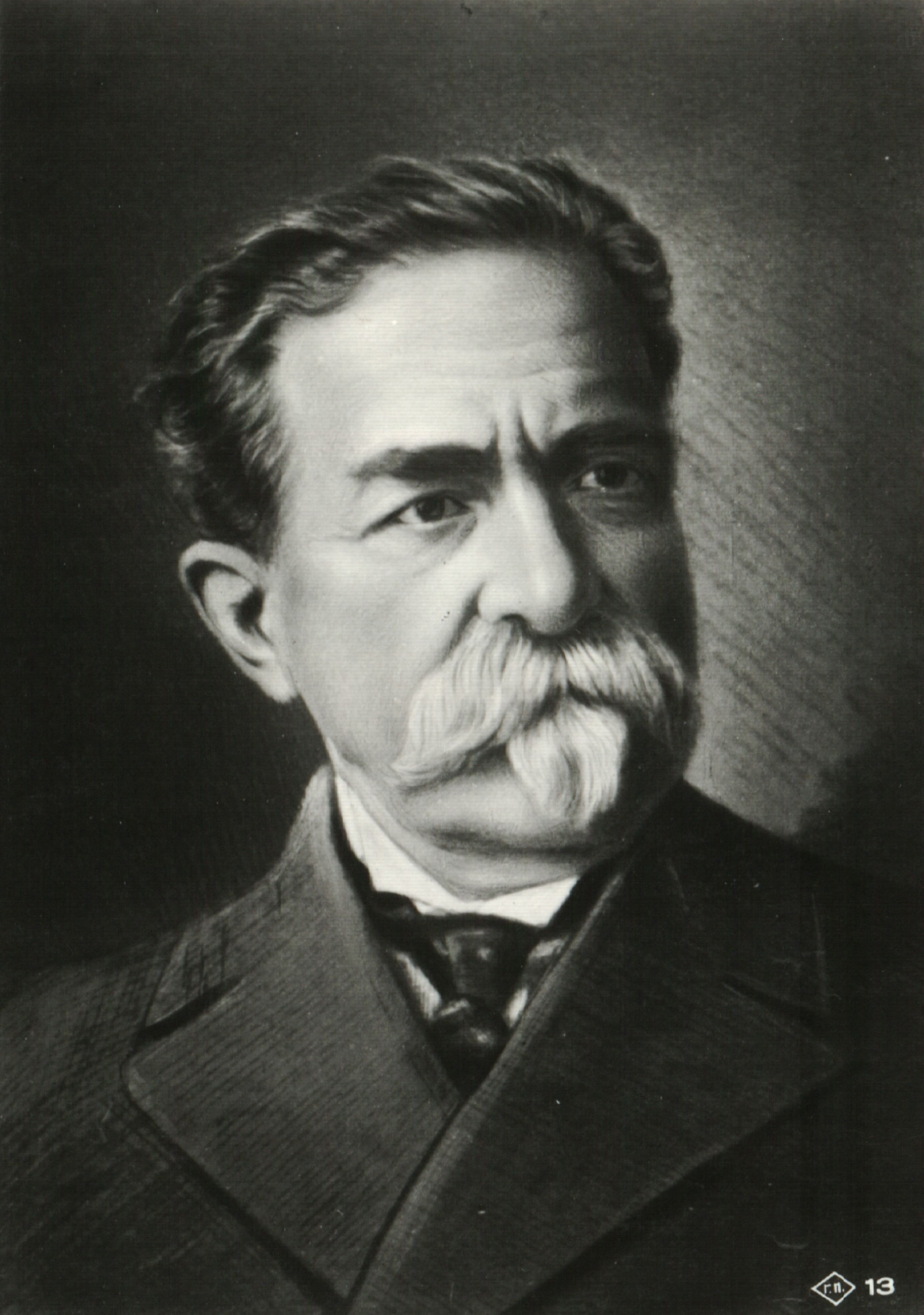
Stoyan Mihaylovski

Stoyan Nikolov Mihaylovski (Bulgarian: Стоян Николов Михайловски; 7 January 1856 – 3 August 1927) was a Bulgarian writer and social figure.

== Biography ==
Mihaylovski was born to a prominent Bulgarian National Revival family in Elena as the son of Nikola Mihaylovski and the nephew of religious leader Stoyan Mihaylovski, better known as Ilarion Makariopolski. Having begun his education in Tarnovo in 1865–1868, he finished the Galatasaray High School in the Ottoman capital Istanbul in 1872. At Galatasaray, Mihaylovski was a classmate of Konstantin Velichkov. From 1872 to 1874, Mihaylovski was a teacher in Dojran, Macedonia; in 1875, he travelled to France to study law at the University of Aix in Aix-en-Provence.

After the Liberation of Bulgaria in 1878, Mihaylovski worked as a lawyer and judge in the Principality of Bulgaria. From 1878 to 1879 he was member of the Svishtov legal council. In 1880, he was editor-in-chief of the Plovdiv-based Popular Voice newspaper; in the same year, he headed a department of the Bulgarian Ministry of Foreign Affairs.

In 1883, Mihaylovski graduated in law in France and was appointed chief secretary of the Ministry of Justice, a post he held until 1884. In 1887, he was member of the Rousse court of appeal and in 1889 he worked as a teacher of French at the Rousse men's high school. From 1892 to 1894 and from 1897 to 1899, he was extracurricular teacher of French at the Faculty of Law and Faculty of History and Philology of Sofia University respectively. From 1895 to 1899, he was reader of literary history at the same university. In 1882, he was admitted to the Bulgarian Academy of Sciences as a correspondent member; he was promoted to full member in 1898.

From 1901 to 1903, Mihaylovski presided the Supreme Macedonian–Adrianopolitan Committee, a Sofia-based organization seeking the autonomy of Macedonia and Thrace. He was member of the National Assembly of Bulgaria in 1886–1887, 1894–1896 and 1903–1908. Following a public scandal in 1904, he was suspended for an article criticizing Prince Ferdinand of Bulgaria. In 1905, he retired from his active social activities. Mihaylovski died in Sofia in 1927.

== Works ==
Mihaylovski's literary activity dates back to 1872 and the Istanbul-based Chitalishte magazine. His works fall into a variety of genres and spans fables, epigrams, maxims, parodies, poems and dramas. His fables, such as Eagle and Snail, Owl and Firefly, Axe and Pickaxe, are among Bulgarian literature's classics. A leading motive in his entire body of work is the perpetual unattainability of freedom and the triumph of mediocrity and oppression.

Mihaylovski is popular for authoring the anthem of Bulgarian culture and education, the song Cyril and Methodius (better with its first stanza, March Ahead, O Revived People), written in Rousse in 1882 and published in the Thought magazine. The music to the anthem was composed by Lyubomir Pipkov in 1901 on the eve of 24 May, the feast day of Bulgarian culture.

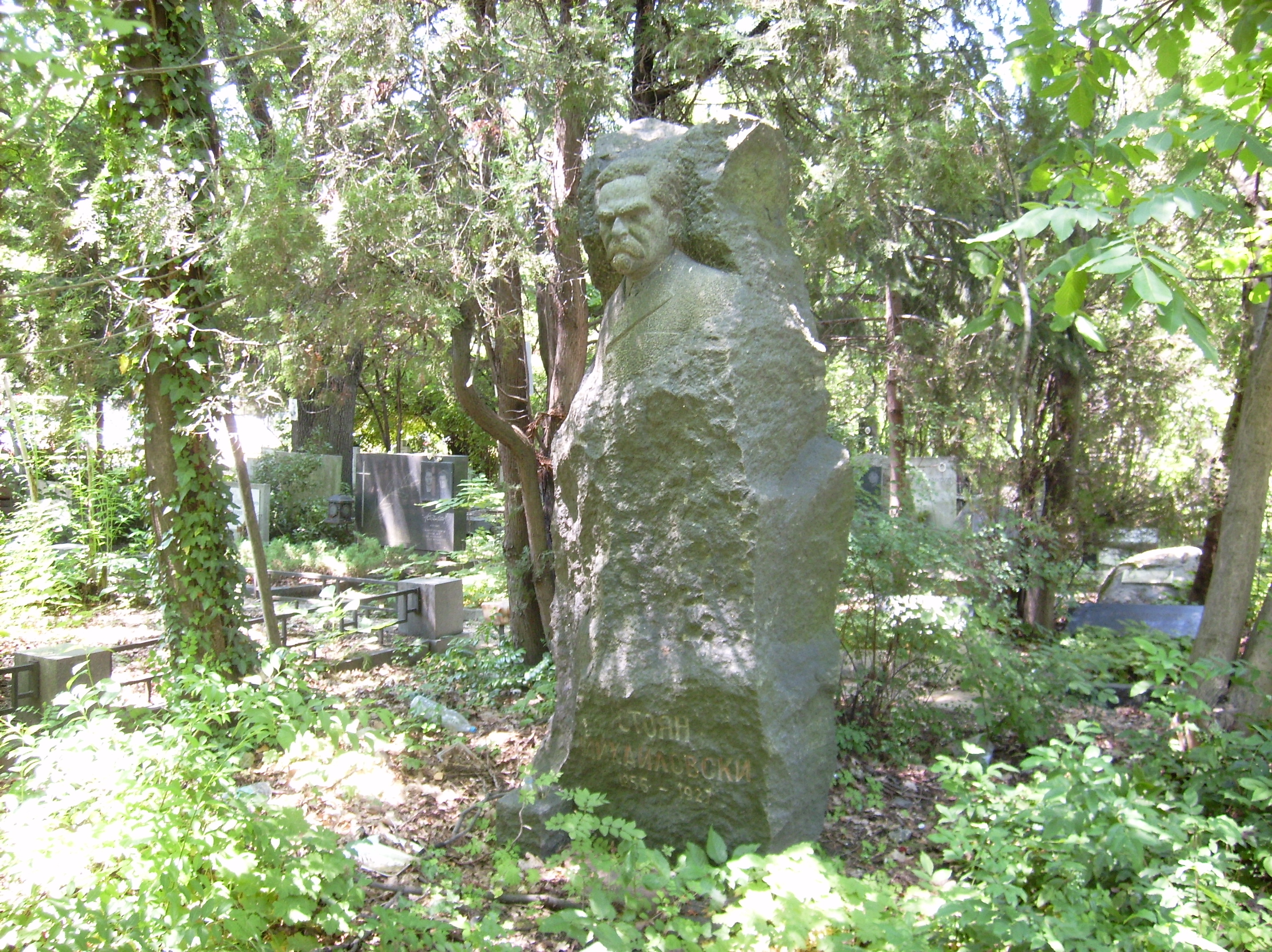
Stoyan Mihaylovski's Grave at Sofia Central Cemetery
