= Our Republic, Hail! =

1947–1951 Bulgarian national anthem

Republiko naša, zdravej!
English: Our Republic, Hail!
- Републико наша, здравей!
- National anthem of the People's Republic of Bulgaria (1947–1951)
- Lyrics: Krum Penev
- Music: Georgi Dimitrov
- Adopted: 1947
- Relinquished: 1 January 1951
- Preceded by: „Шуми Марица“
- Succeeded by: „Българийо мила“

"Our Republic, Hail!" (Bulgarian: Републико наша, здравей!) was the national anthem of the People's Republic of Bulgaria from 1947 until 1951.

The anthem was in use between one year after the Bulgarian kingdom or republic referendum in 1946 and the affirmation of a new anthem in 1951.

The anthem was obtained through a contest that was announced on 14 February 1947.

== Other anthems ==
During this period, in the current proposal of the establishment of a southern Balkan Federation, the song "Hey, Slavs" is usually played after the anthem. It was considered as an unofficial national anthem during that period. After the proposed federation failed in June 1948, the song became unpopular.

== Lyrics ==
Bulgarian original

Cyrillic script

Ярема на робство сурово
И мрака на сива съдба
Ний сринахме с огън и слово
В жестока неравна борба.

Припев:
Републико наша народна,
Републико наша здравей!
Земята ни днес е свободна,
Свободно днес всеки живей!

За нас свободата е свята
И ние ще браним с любов.
Кръвта на борците, пролята
По всяка падина и ров.

Припев

За наши и чужди тирани,
Родино, в теб няма простор!
Ний помним безбройните рани,
Фашисткия кървав терор.

Припев

Latin script

Jarema na robstvo surovo
I mraka na siva sǎdba
Nij srinahme s ogǎn i slovo
V žestoka neravna borba.

Pripev:
Republiko naša narodna,
Republiko naša zdravej!
Zemjata ni dnes e svobodna,
Svobodno dnes vseki živej!

Za nas svobodata e svjata
I nie šte branim s ljubov.
Krǎvta na borcite, proljata
Po vsjaka padina i rov.

Pripev

Za naši i čuždi tirani,
Rodino, v teb njama prostor!
Nij pomnim bezbrojnite rani,
Fašistkija kǎrvav teror.

Pripev

IPA transcription

[jɐˈɾɛ.mɐ na ˈɾɔp.stf̬o sʊˈɾɔ.vo |]
[i‿ˈmɾakɐ na ˈsi.vɐ sədˈba ‖]
[nij ˈsɾi.nɐx.mɛ s‿ˈɔ.ɡən i‿ˈsɫɔ.vo |]
[v‿ʐɛˈstɔ.kɐ nɛˈɾa.vnɐ boɾˈba ‖]

[ˈpɾi.pɛf]
[ɾɛˈpu.bli.ko ˈna.ʂɐ nɐˈɾɔd.nɐ |]
[ɾɛˈpu.bli.ko ˈna.ʂɐ zdɾɐˈvɛj ‖]
[zɛˈmʲæ.tɐ ni‿ˈdnɛs ɛ‿sf̬oˈbɔd.nɐ |]
[sf̬oˈbɔd.no dnɛs ˈfsɛ.ki ʐiˈvɛj ‖]

[za nas sf̬oˈbɔ.dɐ.tɐ ɛ‿ˈsf̬ʲæ.tɐ |]
[i ˈni.ɛ ʂtɛ bɾɐˈnim s‿lʲʉˈbɔf ‖]
[kɾəfˈta na boɾˈtsi.tɛ | pɾoˈlʲæ.tɐ |]
[pɔ‿ˈfsʲæ.kɐ pɐ.diˈna i‿ˈɾɔf ‖]

[ˈpɾi.pɛf]

[za ˈna.ʂi i‿ˈtʂu.ʐdi ˈti.ɾɐ.ni |]
[ˈɾɔ.di.no | f‿tɛp ˈnʲæ.mɐ pɾoˈstɔɾ ‖]
[nij pomˈnim bɛzˈbɾɔj.ni.tɛ ɾɐˈni |]
[fɐˈʂist.ki.jɐ ˈkɤɾ.vɐf tɛˈɾɔɾ ‖]

[ˈpɾi.pɛf]

English translation

The yoke of harsh slavery
And darkness of a grey fate
We have destroyed it with fire and word
In cruel unequal struggle.

Chorus:
Our people's republic,
Our republic, Hail!
Our land is free today,
Freely everyone lives today!

For us, freedom is sacred
And we will defend with love.
The blood of the fighters, shed,
In every Hallow and ditch.

Chorus

For our and foreign tyrants,
Motherland, there is no space in you!
We remember the countless wounds
The fascist bloody terror!

Chorus
