= Georgi Dimitrov (composer) =

Bulgarian composer

- Георги Димитров
- Born: May 2, 1904; Belogradchik, Bulgaria
- Died: March 12, 1979 (aged 74)
- Parents: Dimitar Petrovi (father); Angelina Petrovi (mother)

Georgi Dimitrov (Bulgarian: Георги Димитров) (2 May 1904 – 12 March 1979) was a Bulgarian composer. He was notable for composing the music for the national anthem of Bulgaria from 1947 until 1951, Republiko nasha, zdravey!. Other notable compositions including Foot and Cross, Kulak, and The Chervenkov Way.

== Early life ==
Dimitrov was born to a Bulgarian family of Angelina and Dimitar Petrovi in Belogradchik, Bulgaria. His name was taken from the Gergyovden day (Saint George's Day), that occurred in the eve of his birth.

He spent his youth and teenage years in Belogradchik and Lom, where he studied at Lom Pedagogical School. Dimitrov was raised in a musical family; his mother was a singer, and his father was a violinist. He would follow in his father's footsteps and also pick up the violin, studying under Belcho Belchev and Obreten Evstatiev.

Dimitrov's early years were tumultuous, marked by a struggle against the status quo. This pushed him to leave the country at 19, spending some time in Romania, Yugoslavia, and then settling down on Poland for 15 years.

In the fall of 1927, Georgi Dimitrov became a student at the Warsaw Conservatory. Among his teachers were Stanisław Kazuro, Kasimir Sikorsky, Grzegorz Fitelberg, Stanisław Viekhovich. During his time at the conservatory, he would study music theory, harmony, voice, conducting, and composition, along with his violin training. He would also come into contact with Karol Szymanowski, a Polish composer.

Georgi Dimitrov married Lyuba Palikarova.Now needing to support his new family, he took on work as a high school music teacher in the town of Grueth. In 1931, he moved to Warsaw to continue teaching at a different school called "Stanislav Lorenz".

Dimitrov graduated from the conservatory with honours in 1934. That same year, Begetner and Wolf, a Polish publishing house, would print scores of his "Three Bulgarian Folk Songs" ("Seyla is a Little Girl", "Ummrell Djerman" and "I Move, I Want") on the recommendation of Karol Shimanovski. He also became a conductor of the Bulgarian Student Society "Hristo Botev".

Dimitrov woould continue his academic journey and study musicology at the Warsaw University.

== Career ==
In 1938, Georgi Dimitrov returned to Bulgaria, filled with ideas and business plans. The qualities of the 35-year-old musician do not go unnoticed and gradually he starts to "climb" on the steep music and public ladder. In this process an important role played the impressive success achieved by the man-made chamber choir - which mainly promotes the work of the Bulgarian composers, who regularly concerts "live" in Radio Sofia. His work as a music inspector at the Ministry of National Education and the Artistic Secretary of the Sofia Opera have confirmed him as a prospective conductor, composer and public figure with a high state feeling.

In the years after the end of the Second World War, Dimitrov headed the new state structure "Directorate for Music, Creativity and Performing Arts" through which state policy on culture was implemented. Under Georgi Dimitrov's leadership, a large-scale prospective plan was developed and carried out, involving: - the creation of new state symphony orchestras and operas in Plovdiv, Varna, Rousse, Pleven, Bourgas, Shumen, Vidin, Vratsa; - the introduction of "government procurement" practices as stimulus for the creation of new musical works; - the regulation of Bulgarian music as the main indicator in the repertoire of all music institutes in the country; - increasing the percentage prominent international artists in concert; - setting state policy on the export of Bulgarian musicians abroad; - the establishment of various national competitions for instrumentalists and singers, and the reviews of state symphony orchestras and operas; - the creation of the State Folk Song and Dance Ensemble "Philip Kutev" and defining its role as an example of the rapid development of folklore art in the country; - developing a concept of the important role of non-professional (amateur) art as a natural reserve and an integral part of the public phenomenon of musical art; - systemic state support for young musicians and ballet dancers by participating in international competitions and raising their professional qualifications in the most renowned schools in Europe.

In this series a special place is occupied by Professor Georgi Dimitrov in 1951, choir-conductor specialty at the State Music Academy. For the needs of the choir-conducting education, the professor creates several teaching aids, among which the "Choral arts talks", the multi-volume "choir chorus" (in co-authorship) and others. Parallel to this, starting in 1949, for more than 15 years he has held "summer courses" for the improvement of the professional qualification of the choral conductors and especially of the teachers-choral conductors.

Dimitrov's choir-conducting school and his chore-conducting cadres were an important part of his "Golden Deposit" not only in the Bulgarian, but also in the world cultural treasury. He created a host of conductors-conductors, conductors-phenomena such as (in alphabetical order) Prof. Vassil Arnaudov, Prof. Veneta Vicheva, Varban Rangelov, Prof. Georgi Robev, Prof. Kiril Stefanov, Prof. Lilia Gyuleva, Lubomir Karoleev, Marin Tzonev, Acad. Hristo Nedyalkov, Acad. Valentin Bobevski, etc., whose art is recognized everywhere in the world. He is also known for fighting discrimination against women in the male-dominated conducting profession. Another important part of Dimitrov's contribution to Bulgarian culture is his choral work. Unlike his most famous songs written in Poland ("Ummrell Djerman", "I Move, I Move", "Seyla e"), Bulgarians are characterized by their vitality, patriotism, optimism, ingenuity and captivating humor ("Flowering Lichko-lyric "," Dülger's Sword "," Evening Twilight "," Siniger's Wedding "," Spring of Me, "" Sword of the Lilac ", etc.). the first Bulgarian a cappella cantata "Kratka na Rodina", for children and girls. Rough calculations show Dimitrov's working day may have been about 20 hours. In the morning, Dimitrov would get up early and go to the directorate, then to lectures and every night - he was necessarily present at a concert in Bulgaria Hall, where he had a "reserved" place on the first row before the first lodge or a show to be accurately informed. He would then visit to the Club of the Union of Bulgarian Composers and spend the midnight hours composing. He had iron health and easily endured the enormous daily stress. He was a man with a strong sense of humor, which he used "sparingly," but "right on the spot." He loved to cook and I admit that I tasted more gullish than his one in Hungary! He was not speechless, but all his speeches were precise and constructive.

Georgi Dimitrov managed relationships based on his professional assessments. This approach occasionally led to disagreements with governing institutions. He interacted with others directly and hosted guests.

The more the time progresses, the more he confirms the significance of the work of the artist, teacher and statesman Prof. Georgi Dimitrov. Despite the serious illness that has diminished his public activity during the last 15 years of his life, he never ceased to be interested in his problems and to give his wise advice about the development of Bulgarian musical art.
