= Dobri Hristov =

Bulgarian composer (1875–1941)

- Добри Христов
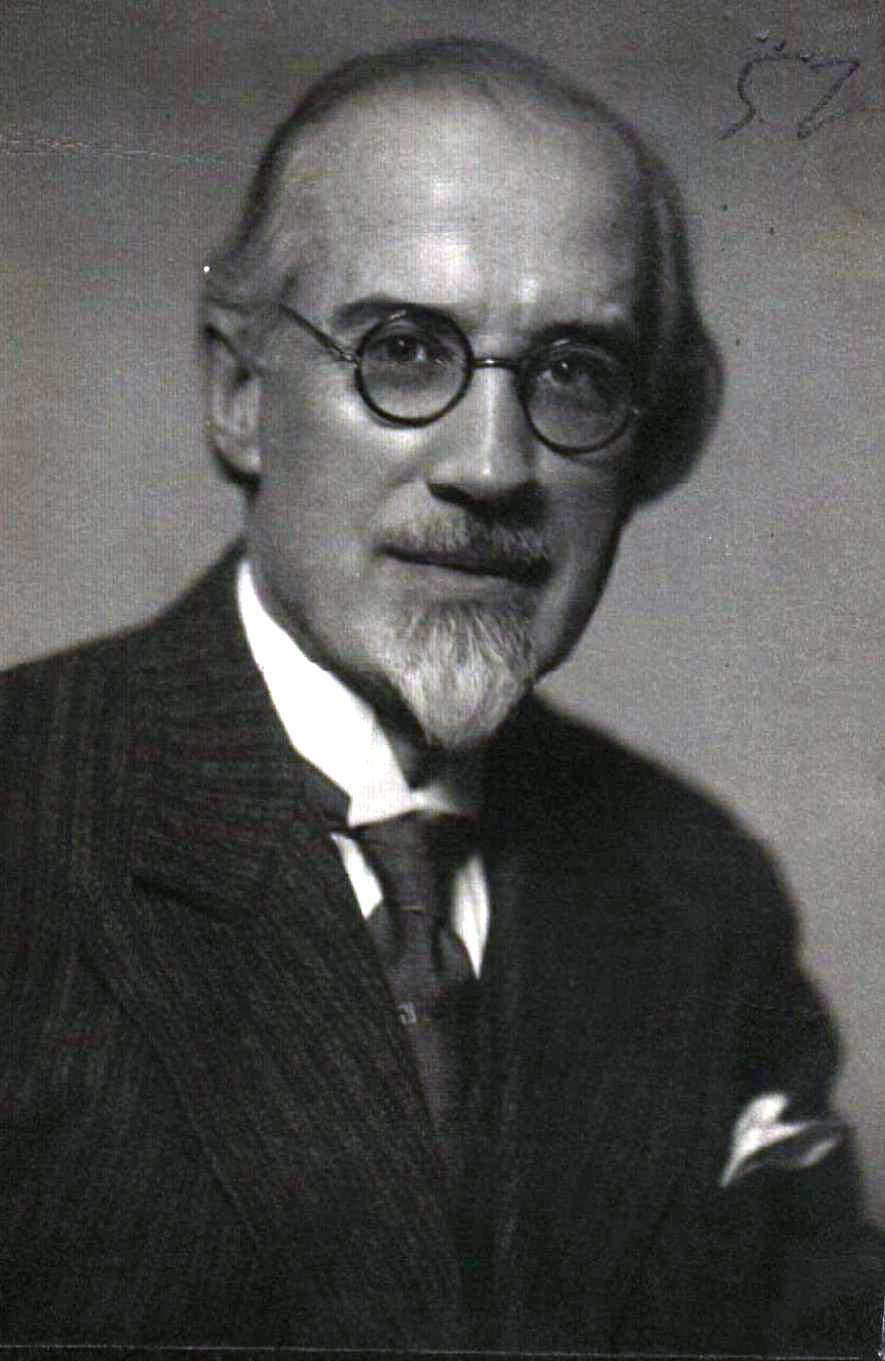
- Born: 14 December 1875
- Died: 23 January 1941 (aged 65)
- Occupation: Composer

Dobri Hristov (Bulgarian: Добри Христов; 14 December 1875 – 23 January 1941) was one of the major Bulgarian composers of the 20th century. He wrote mainly choral music, as well as some church music and music for the orchestra.

Hristov was born in Varna, then in the Ottoman Empire. He graduated from the Prague Conservatory in 1903 (under the directorship of the famous Czech composer Antonín Dvořák). He returned to Bulgaria and helped with the development of Bulgarian music culture, using many Bulgarian folklore elements in his compositions. He was conductor of The Seven Saints ensemble and choir in the church of the same name in Sofia, Bulgaria between 1911 and 1928. He died in Sofia in 1941 at age 65.

== Works ==
- Blagoslovi, soul moia, Gospoda
- Heruvimskaya pesn' No. 4
- Nyne otpushchayeshi
- Sviatii Bozhe No. 4
- You Poem
