= Bulgaria Hall =

Concert hall in Sofia, Bulgaria

Coordinates: 42.6952°N 23.3276°E

Bulgaria Hall (Bulgarian: Зала „България“) is a concert hall in Sofia, Bulgaria, and the principal hall of the Concert Complex Bulgaria. Opened in 1937, it is the home venue of the Sofia Philharmonic Orchestra, Bulgaria's national orchestra.

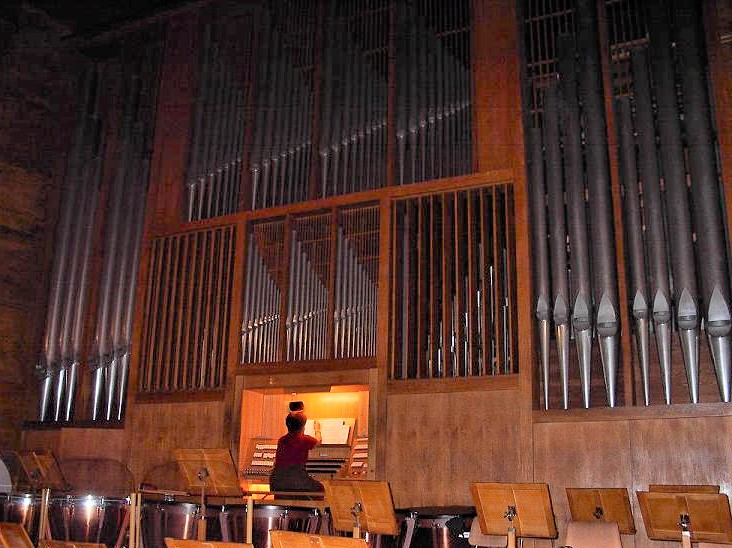
The concert organ of Bulgaria Hall

The hall is located at 1 Aksakov Street in central Sofia, between the Ministry of Defence and the former Royal Palace. The hall is described it as "the most significant concert center in the country" and is a venue for major musical events in the Bulgarian capital.

== History ==
Bulgaria Hall was inaugurated in 1937 as part of the Concert Complex Bulgaria. The building was designed by the architects Stancho Belkovski and Ivan Danchov and is considered one of the notable examples of Sofia's interwar public architecture.

During the bombing of Sofia in 1944, the hall suffered serious damage, including the destruction of its original organ. After reconstruction, it resumed its role as one of Bulgaria's leading concert venues.

== Organ ==
The first concert organ in Bulgaria was installed in Bulgaria Hall in 1937. It was a Sauer organ with four manuals and 72 stops.

A new organ by the German firm Alexander Schuke Potsdam Orgelbau was installed in the hall in 1974.

== Concert Complex Bulgaria ==
Bulgaria Hall is the largest hall in the Concert Complex Bulgaria, which also includes the Chamber Hall, Studio Music and Gallery Bulgaria. It is as one of Sofia's principal classical music venues.

== Home of the Sofia Philharmonic ==
Bulgaria Hall is the permanent home of the Sofia Philharmonic Orchestra.

Since 2017, the orchestra has been led by Bulgarian conductor Nayden Todorov as artistic director, and as such he is also managing director of the hall.

== International orchestras and conductors ==
Over the decades Bulgaria Hall has hosted performances by major international orchestras and conductors. Guest orchestras appearing in the hall have included the Vienna Philharmonic, the Los Angeles Philharmonic, the Bavarian Radio Symphony Orchestra under Mariss Jansons, and the Munich Philharmonic under Sergiu Celibidache.

Celibidache's appearance with the Munich Philharmonic in Bulgaria Hall is described as one of the memorable musical events in the hall's history.

Conductors associated with the hall and the Sofia Philharmonic have included Zubin Mehta, Kurt Masur, Valery Gergiev, Charles Dutoit, Christoph Eschenbach, Vladimir Ashkenazy, Sir Neville Marriner and Marek Janowski.

== Notable performers ==
The hall has been associated with major twentieth- and twenty-first-century musicians and composers, including Dmitri Shostakovich, Aram Khachaturian, Sviatoslav Richter, Mstislav Rostropovich, David Oistrakh, Emil Gilels, Yehudi Menuhin, Alexis Weissenberg, Nicolai Ghiaurov, Raina Kabaivanska, Anna Tomowa-Sintow and Gena Dimitrova.

During the 2010s and 2020s, Bulgaria Hall hosted appearances by internationally known artists including Joshua Bell, Maxim Vengerov, Vadim Repin, Martha Argerich, Ivo Pogorelić, Midori, Sarah Chang, Shlomo Mintz, Gautier Capuçon, Ray Chen, Freddie De Tommaso, Sonya Yoncheva, Juan Diego Flórez, Diana Damrau, Plácido Domingo and José Carreras.

== Cultural significance ==
Because of its acoustics, historical continuity and association with the Sofia Philharmonic, Bulgaria Hall has remained one of the central institutions of Bulgarian musical life and an important venue in the classical music culture of Southeastern Europe.
