= Flag of Germany =

Federal Republic of Germany
- Use: Civil and state flag, civil ensign
- Proportion: 3:5
- Adopted: 3 July 1919; 107 years ago (original proportions); 23 May 1949; 77 years ago (current proportions); 3 October 1990; 36 years ago (German reunification)
- Design: A horizontal tricolour of black, red, and gold
- Bundesdienstflagge und Dienstflagge der Landstreitkräfte der Bundeswehr
- Use: State flag and ensign, war flag
- Proportion: 3:5
- Adopted: 7 June 1950; 76 years ago
- Design: The civil flag with the coat of arms at the centre.
- Dienstflagge der Seestreitkräfte der Bundeswehr
- Use: Naval ensign
- Proportion: 3:5
- Adopted: 25 May 1956; 70 years ago
- Design: A swallowtail of the civil flag with the coat of arms at the centre.

Common unofficial flag variant with the coat of arms of Germany

The national flag of Germany is a tricolour consisting of three equal horizontal bands displaying the national colours of Germany: black, red, and gold (German: Schwarz-Rot-Gold). The flag was first sighted in 1848 in the German Confederation. The flag was also used by the German Empire from 1848 to 1849. It was officially adopted as the national flag of the German Reich (during the period of the Weimar Republic) from 1919 to 1933, and has been in use since its reintroduction in the Federal Republic of Germany in 1949.

Since the mid-19th century, Germany has had two competing traditions of national colours, black-red-gold and black-white-red. Black-red-gold were the colours of the 1848–1849 Revolutions, the Weimar Republic of 1919–1933 and the Federal Republic (since 1949). They were also adopted by the German Democratic Republic (1949–1990).

The colours black-white-red appeared for the first time in 1867 in the constitution of the North German Confederation. This nation state of Prussia and other north and central German States was expanded to the south German states in 1870–71, under the name German Empire. It kept these colours until the revolution of 1918–19. Thereafter, black-white-red became a symbol of the political right. The Nazis (National Socialist German Workers' Party) re-established these colours along with the party's own swastika flag in 1933. After World War II, black-white-red was still used by some conservative groups or by groups of the far right, as it is not forbidden, unlike specific Nazi symbols such as the aforementioned swastika.

Black-red-gold is the official flag of the Federal Republic of Germany. As an official symbol of the constitutional order, it is protected against defamation. According to §90a of the German penal code, the consequences are a fine or imprisonment up to three years.

== Origins ==
The German association with the colours black, red, and gold surfaced in the radical 1840s, when the black-red-gold flag was used to symbolise the movement against the Conservative Order, which was established in Europe after Napoleon's defeat.

There are many theories in circulation regarding the origins of the colour scheme used in the 1848 flag. It has been proposed that the colours were those of the Jena Students' League (Jenaer Burschenschaft), one of the radically minded Burschenschaften banned by Metternich in the Carlsbad Decrees. The colours are mentioned in their canonical order in the seventh verse of August Daniel von Binzer's student song Zur Auflösung der Jenaer Burschenschaft ("On the Dissolution of the Jena Students' League") quoted by Johannes Brahms in his Academic Festival Overture. Another claim goes back to the uniforms (mainly black with red facings and gold buttons) of the Lützow Free Corps, which were mostly worn by university students and were formed during the struggle against the occupying forces of Napoleon. Whatever the true explanation, those colours soon came to be regarded as the national colours of Germany during that brief period. Especially after their reintroduction during the Weimar period, they became synonymous with liberalism in general. The colours also appear in the medieval Reichsadler.

== Flag variants ==
=== Civil flag ===
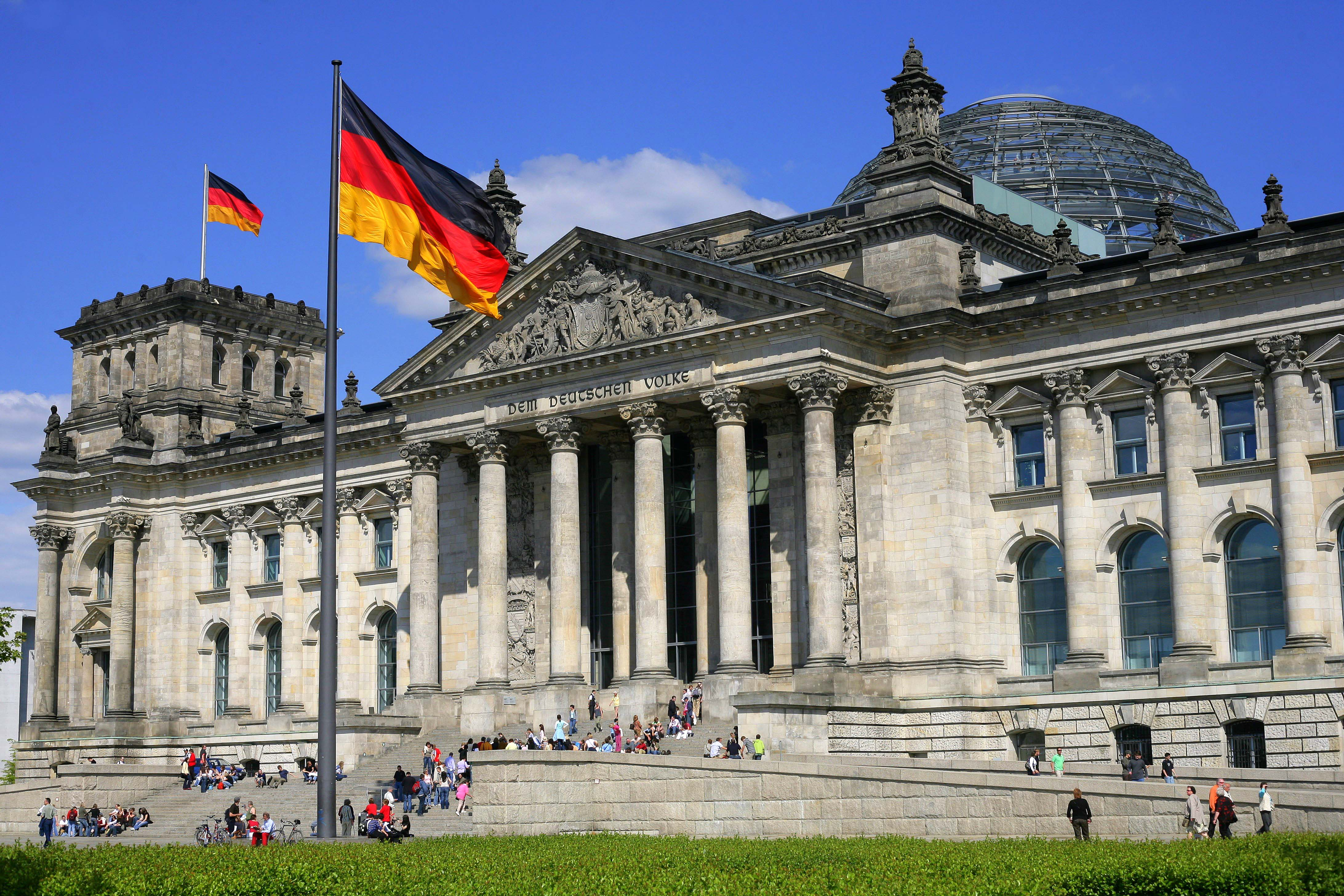
The German Unity Flag is a national memorial to German reunification that was raised on 3 October 1990. It flies in front of the Reichstag building in Berlin (seat of the German parliament).

The German national flag or Bundesflagge (English: Federal flag), containing only the black-red-gold tricolour, was introduced as part of the (West) German constitution in 1949. Following the creation of separate government and military flags in later years, the plain tricolour is now used as the German civil flag and civil ensign. This flag is also used by non-federal authorities to show their connection to the federal government, e.g. the authorities of the German states use the German national flag together with their own flag.

=== Government flag ===
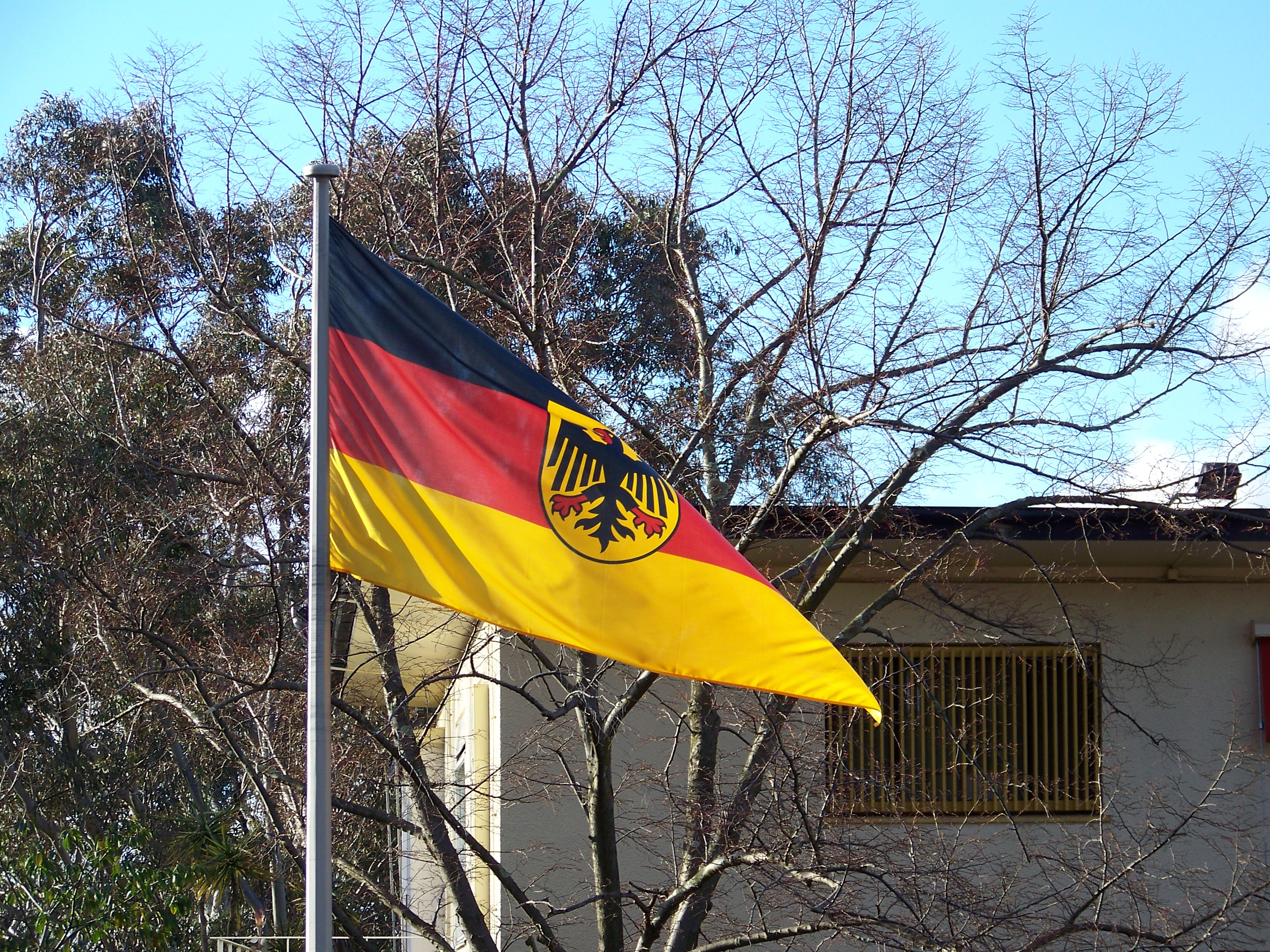
Bundesdienstflagge at the German Embassy, Canberra, Australia

The government flag of Germany is officially known as the Dienstflagge der Bundesbehörden (state flag of the federal authorities) or Bundesdienstflagge for short. It was introduced in 1950. It is the civil flag defaced with the Bundesschild ("Federal Shield"), which overlaps with up to one fifth of the black and gold bands. The Bundesschild is a variant of the coat of arms of Germany, whose main differences are the illustration of the eagle and the shape of the shield: the Bundesschild is rounded at the base, whereas the standard coat of arms is pointed.

The government flag may only be used by federal government authorities and its use by others is an offence, punishable with a fine. However, public use of flags similar to the Bundesdienstflagge (e.g. using the actual coat of arms instead of the Bundesschild) is tolerated, and such flags are sometimes seen at international sporting events.

=== Vertical flags ===
Civil banner

Government banner

In addition to the normal horizontal format, many public buildings in Germany use vertical flags. Most town halls fly their town flag together with the national flag (and usually the flag of the state they are in and the flag of the European Union) in this way; many town flags in Germany exist only in vertical form. The proportions of these vertical flags are not specified. In 1996, a layout for the vertical version of the government flag was established, that coincidentally matched the pattern of the "conventional" black-red-gold flag of the Principality of Reuss-Gera (Fürstentum Reuß-Gera) from 1806 to 1918: the Bundesschild is displayed in the centre of the flag, overlapping with up to one fifth of the black and gold bands. When hung like a banner or draped, the black band should be on the left, as illustrated. When flown from a vertical flagpole, the black band must face the staff. The only type of vertical flag that can be flown under the Federal Government Decree is a banner. Flags in vertical format, vertical flags with outrigger and hanging flags are not permitted.

=== Military flags ===
Since the German armed forces (Bundeswehr) are a federal authority, the Bundesdienstflagge is also used as the German war flag on land. In 1956, the Dienstflagge der Seestreitkräfte der Bundeswehr (Flag of the German Navy) was introduced: the government flag ending in swallowtail. This naval flag is also used as a navy jack.

== Design ==
Specifications for the flag of Germany

Article 22 of the German constitution, the Basic Law for the Federal Republic of Germany, states:

The federal flag shall be black, red and gold.

Following specifications set by the West German government in 1950, the flag displays three bars of equal width and has a width–length ratio of 3:5; the tricolour used during the Weimar Republic had a ratio of 2:3.

At the time of the adoption of the flag there were no exact colour specifications other than "Black-Red-Gold". However on 2 June 1999, the federal cabinet introduced a corporate design for the German government which defined the specifications of the official colours as:

Colour scheme	Black	Red	Gold
RAL	9005; Jet black	3020; Traffic red	1023; Traffic yellow
HKS	0, 0, 0	5.0PB 3.0/12	6.0R 4.5/14
CMYK	0.0.0.100	0.100.100.8	0.19.100.0
Pantone (approximation)	N/A	168	7405 (Note: The value given here is an alternative to the following more-complicated combination: Yellow (765 g), Red 032 (26 g), Black (11 g), Transp. White (198 g))
Hexadecimal	#000000	#D00000	#FFCE00 (Note: Recommended RGB values for online use.)
Decimal RGB	0,0,0	208,0,0	255,206,0

A version of the German flag where the golden band is of a metallic golden colour. This version was sometimes used in official publications before the introduction of the federal government's corporate design in 1999.

The flag is blazoned in English as, "Tierced in fess sable, gules and or."

=== Colour ===
Vexillology rarely distinguishes between gold and yellow; in heraldry, they are both Or. For the German flag, such a distinction is made: the colour used in the flag is called gold, not yellow.

When the black–red–gold tricolour was adopted by the Weimar Republic as its flag, it was attacked by conservatives, monarchists, and the far right, who referred to the colours with spiteful nicknames such as Schwarz–Rot–Gelb (black–red–yellow) or even Schwarz–Rot–Senf (black–red–mustard). When the Nazis came to power in 1933, the black–white–red colours of pre-1918 Imperial Germany were swiftly reintroduced, and their propaganda machine continued to discredit the Schwarz–Rot–Gold, using the same derogatory terms as previously used by the monarchists.

On 24 December 1951, the Federal Court of Justice (Bundesgerichtshof) stated that the usage of "black–red–yellow" and the like had "through years of Nazi agitation, attained the significance of a malicious slander against the democratic symbols of the state" and was now an offence. As summarised by heraldist Arnold Rabbow in 1968, "the German colours are black–red–yellow but they are called black–red–gold."

== Flag-flying days ==
There are a number of flag-flying days in Germany. Following federal decree on 22 March 2005, the flag must be flown from public buildings on the following dates. Only 1 May and 3 October are public holidays.

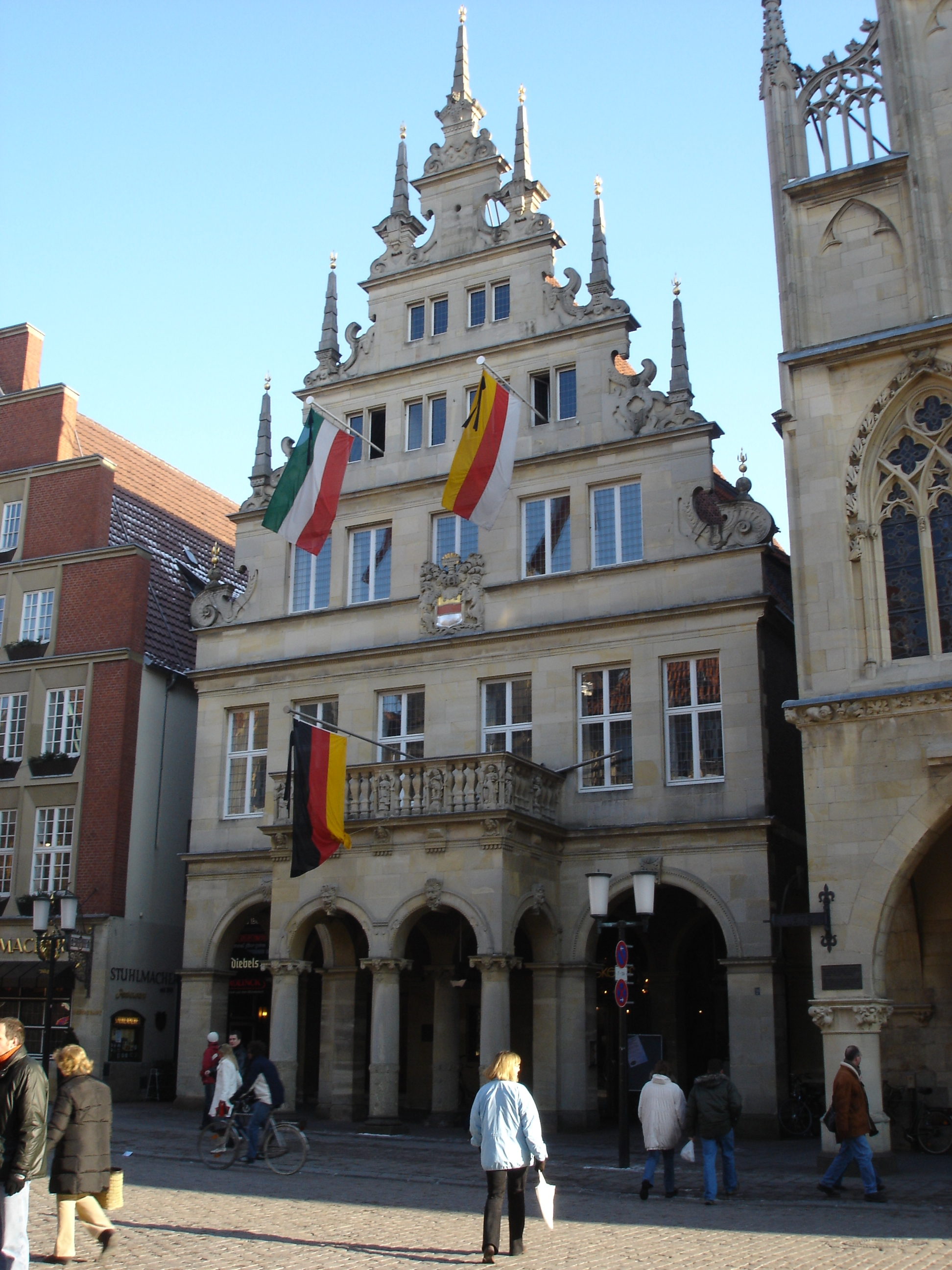
The Stadtweinhaus in Münster with banners displayed in mourning (note the black ribbons atop each staff) after the death of former German president Johannes Rau in 2006

Date	Name	Reason
27 January	Commemoration Day for the Victims of National Socialism; Tag des Gedenkens an die Opfer des Nationalsozialismus	Anniversary of the liberation of Auschwitz concentration camp (1945), observed by the United Nations as International Holocaust Remembrance Day (half-staff)
1 May	Day of Labour; Tag der Arbeit	Established for German labour unions to demonstrate for the promotion of workers' welfare
9 May	Europe Day; Europatag	Anniversary of the Schuman Declaration, leading to the European Union (1950)
23 May	Constitution Day; Grundgesetztag	Anniversary of the German Basic Law (1949)
17 June	Anniversary of 17 June 1953; Jahrestag des 17. Juni 1953	Anniversary of the East German uprising of 1953
20 July	Anniversary of 20 July 1944; Jahrestag des 20. Juli 1944	Anniversary of the 20 July Plot, the failed assassination attempt on Adolf Hitler by Claus von Stauffenberg (1944)
3 October	German Unity Day; Tag der Deutschen Einheit	Anniversary of German reunification (1990)
The 2nd Sunday before Advent	People's Mourning Day; Volkstrauertag	In memory of all killed during wartime (half-staff)
Source: Federal Government of Germany

Election days for the Bundestag and the European Parliament are also flag days in some states, in addition to other state-specific flag days. The public display of flags to mark other events, such as the election of the president or the death of a prominent politician (whereupon flags would be at half-staff), can be declared at the discretion of the Federal Ministry of the Interior. When flags are required to be flown at half-staff, vertical flags are not lowered. A black mourning ribbon is instead attached, either atop the staff (if hung from a pole) or to each end of the flag's supporting cross-beams (if flown like a banner).

== History ==
=== Medieval period ===
Banners of the Holy Roman Emperor

Early 1400s

c. 1430–1806

The Holy Roman Empire (800/962 – 1806, known as the Holy Roman Empire of the German Nation after 1512) did not have a national flag, but black and gold were used as colours of the Holy Roman Emperor and featured in the imperial banner: a black eagle on a golden background. After the late 13th or early 14th century, the claws and beak of the eagle were coloured red. From the early 15th century, a double-headed eagle was used.

War flag of the Holy Roman Empire (12th–14th century)

The colours red and white were also significant during this period. When the Holy Roman Empire took part in the Crusades, a war flag was flown alongside the black-gold imperial banner. This flag, known as the "Saint George Flag", was a white cross on a red background: the reverse of the St George's Cross used as the flag of England, and similar to the flag of Denmark.

Early Hanseatic flags

Lübeck

Hamburg

Red and white were also colours of the Hanseatic League (13th–17th century). Hanseatic trading ships were identifiable by their red-white pennants, and most Hanseatic cities adopted red and white as their city colours (see Hanseatic flags). Red and white still feature as the colours of many former Hanseatic cities such as Hamburg or Bremen.

=== Principality of Reuss-Greiz ===
After Prince Heinrich XI began his rule over the Reuss Elder Line in 1778, the first-ever black-red-gold tricolour flag was adopted within a German sovereign state.

When Heinrich XI, Prince Reuss of Greiz was appointed by Joseph II, Holy Roman Emperor to rule the then-new Principality of Reuss-Greiz on 12 May 1778, the flag adopted by the Fürstentum Reuß-Greiz was the first-ever appearance of the black-red-gold tricolour in its modern arrangement in any sovereign state within what today comprises Germany – the Reuss elder line that ruled the principality used a flag whose proportions were close to a "nearly square"-shape 4:5 hoist/fly ratio, instead of the modern German flag's 3:5 figure.

=== Napoleonic Wars ===
In 1804, Napoleon Bonaparte declared the First French Empire. In response to this, Holy Roman Emperor Francis II of the Habsburg dynasty declared his personal domain to be the Austrian Empire and became Francis I of Austria. Taking the colours of the banner of the Holy Roman Emperor, the flag of the Austrian Empire was black and gold. Francis II was the last Holy Roman Emperor, with Napoleon forcing the empire's dissolution in 1806. After this point, these colours continued to be used as the flag of Austria until 1918.

With the end of the Holy Roman Empire in 1806, many of its dukes and princes joined the Confederation of the Rhine, a confederation of Napoleonic client states. These states preferred to use their own flags. The confederation had no flag of its own; instead it used the blue-white-red flag of France and the Imperial Standard of its protector, Napoleon.

During the Napoleonic Wars, the German struggle against the occupying French forces was significantly symbolised by the colours of black, red, and gold, which became popular after their use in the uniforms of the Lützow Free Corps, a volunteer unit of the Prussian Army. This unit had uniforms in black with red facings and gold buttons. The colour choice had pragmatic origins, even though black-red-gold were the former colours used by the Holy Roman Empire. At the time, the colours represented:

Out of the blackness (black) of servitude through bloody (red) battles to the golden (gold) light of freedom. (Note: German: Aus der Schwärze der Knechtschaft durch blutige Schlachten ans goldene Licht der Freiheit.)

Members of the corps were required to supply their own clothing: in order to present a uniform appearance it was easiest to dye all clothes black. Gold-coloured buttons were widely available, and pennons used by the lancers in the unit were red and black. As the members of this unit came from all over Germany and included a modest but well known number of university students and academics, the Lützow Free Corps and their colours gained considerable exposure among the German people.

=== German Confederation ===
The flag adopted by the Jena Urburschenschaft

The 1815–16 Congress of Vienna led to the creation of the German Confederation, a loose union of all remaining German states after the Napoleonic Wars. The Confederation was created as a replacement for the now-extinct Holy Roman Empire, with Francis I of Austria—the last Holy Roman Emperor—as its president. The confederation did not have a flag of its own, although the black-red-gold tricolour is sometimes mistakenly attributed to it.

Upon returning from the war, veterans of the Lützow Free Corps founded the Urburschenschaft fraternity in Jena in June 1815. The Jena Urburschenschaft eventually adopted a flag with three equal horizontal bands of red, black, and red, with gold trim and a golden oak branch across the black band, following the colours of the uniforms of the Free Corps. The famous gymnast and student union (Burschenschaften) founder Friedrich Ludwig Jahn proposed a black-red-gold banner for the Burschen. Some members interpreted the colours as a rebirth of the Imperial black-yellow colours embellished with the red of liberty or the blood of war. More radical students exclaimed that the colours stood for the black night of slavery, the bloody struggle for liberty, and the golden dawn of freedom. In a memoir, Anton Probsthan of Mecklenburg, who served in the Lützow Free Corps, claimed his relative Fraulein Nitschke of Jena presented the Burschenschaft with a flag at the time of its foundation, and for this purpose chose the black-red-and-gold colours of the defunct secret society Vandalia.

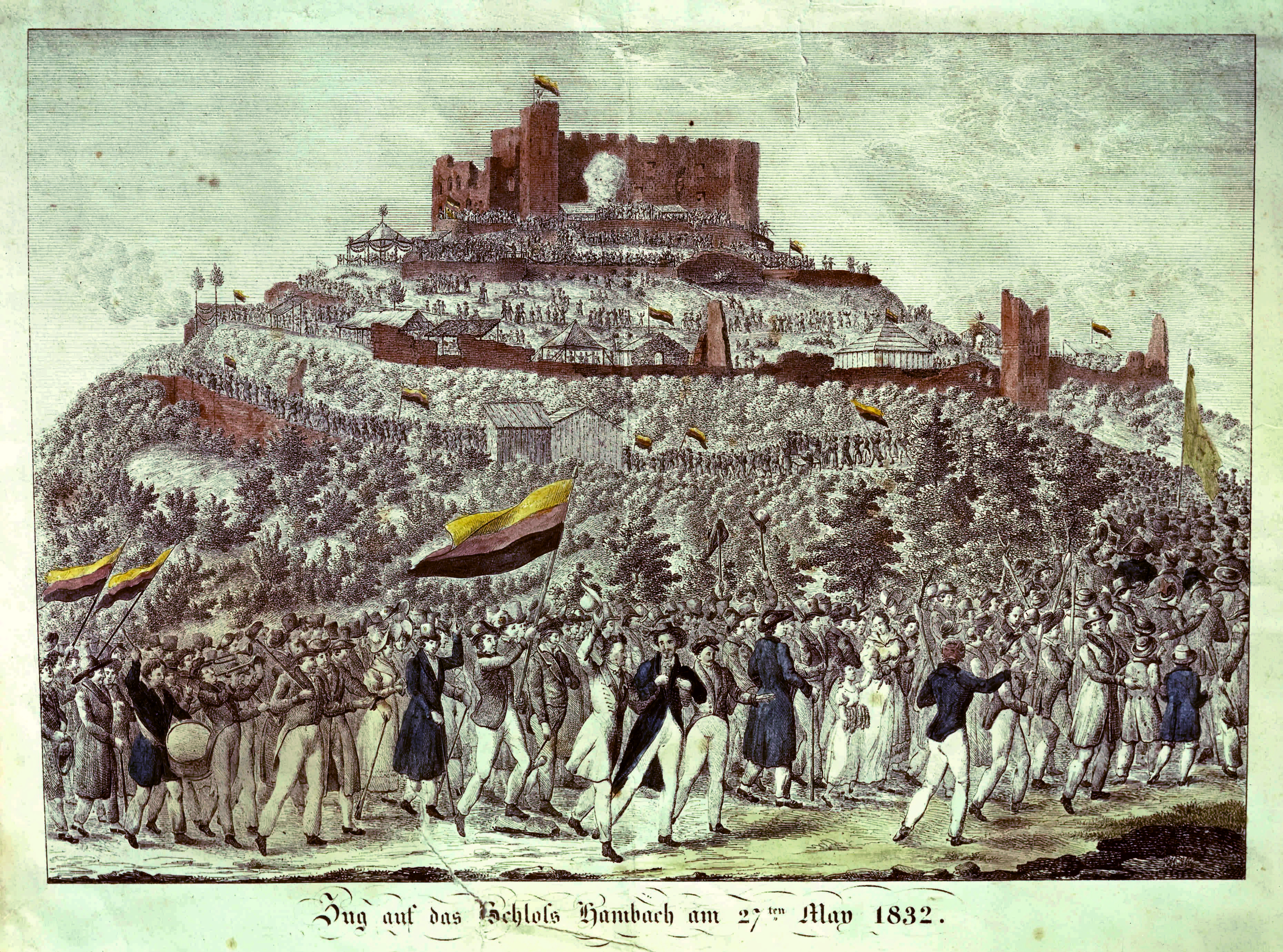
Hambach Festival (May 1832), contemporary lithograph

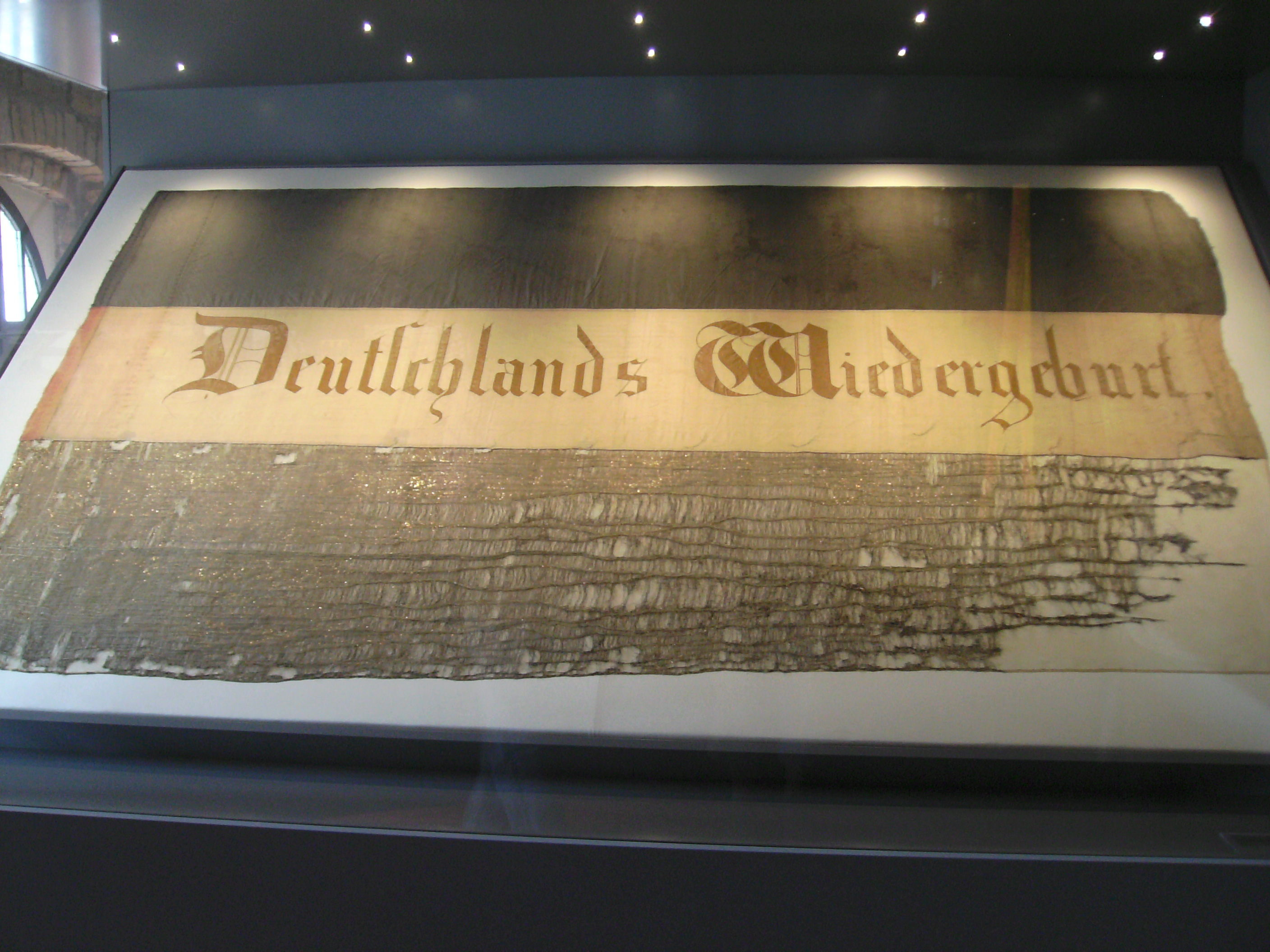
The 1832 Ur-Fahne

Since the students who served in the Lützow Free Corps came from various German states, the idea of a unified German state began to gain momentum within the Urburschenschaft and similar Burschenschaft that were subsequently formed throughout the Confederation. On 18 October 1817, the fourth anniversary of the Battle of Leipzig, hundreds of fraternity members and academics from across the Confederation states met in Wartburg in Saxe-Weimar-Eisenach (in modern Thuringia), calling for a free and unified German nation.

The gold-red-black flag of the Jena Urburschenschaft featured prominently at this Wartburg festival. Therefore, the colours black, red, and gold eventually became symbolic of this desire for a unified German state. The Ministerial Council of the German Confederation, in its determination to maintain the status quo, enacted the Carlsbad Decrees of 1819 that banned all student organisations, officially putting an end to the Burschenschaften.

In May 1832, around 30,000 people demonstrated at the Hambach Festival for freedom, unity, and civil rights. The colours black, red, and gold had become a well established symbol for the liberal, democratic and republican movement within the German states since the Wartburg Festival, and flags in these colours were flown en masse at the Hambach Festival. While contemporary illustrations showed prominent use of a gold-red-black tricolour (an upside-down version of the modern German flag), surviving flags from the event were in black-red-gold. Such an example is the Ur-Fahne, the flag flown from Hambach Castle during the festival: a black-red-gold tricolour where the red band contains the inscription Deutschlands Wiedergeburt (Germany's rebirth). This flag is now on permanent display at the castle.

=== Revolution and the Frankfurt Parliament ===
War ensign of the Reichsflotte (1848–1852)

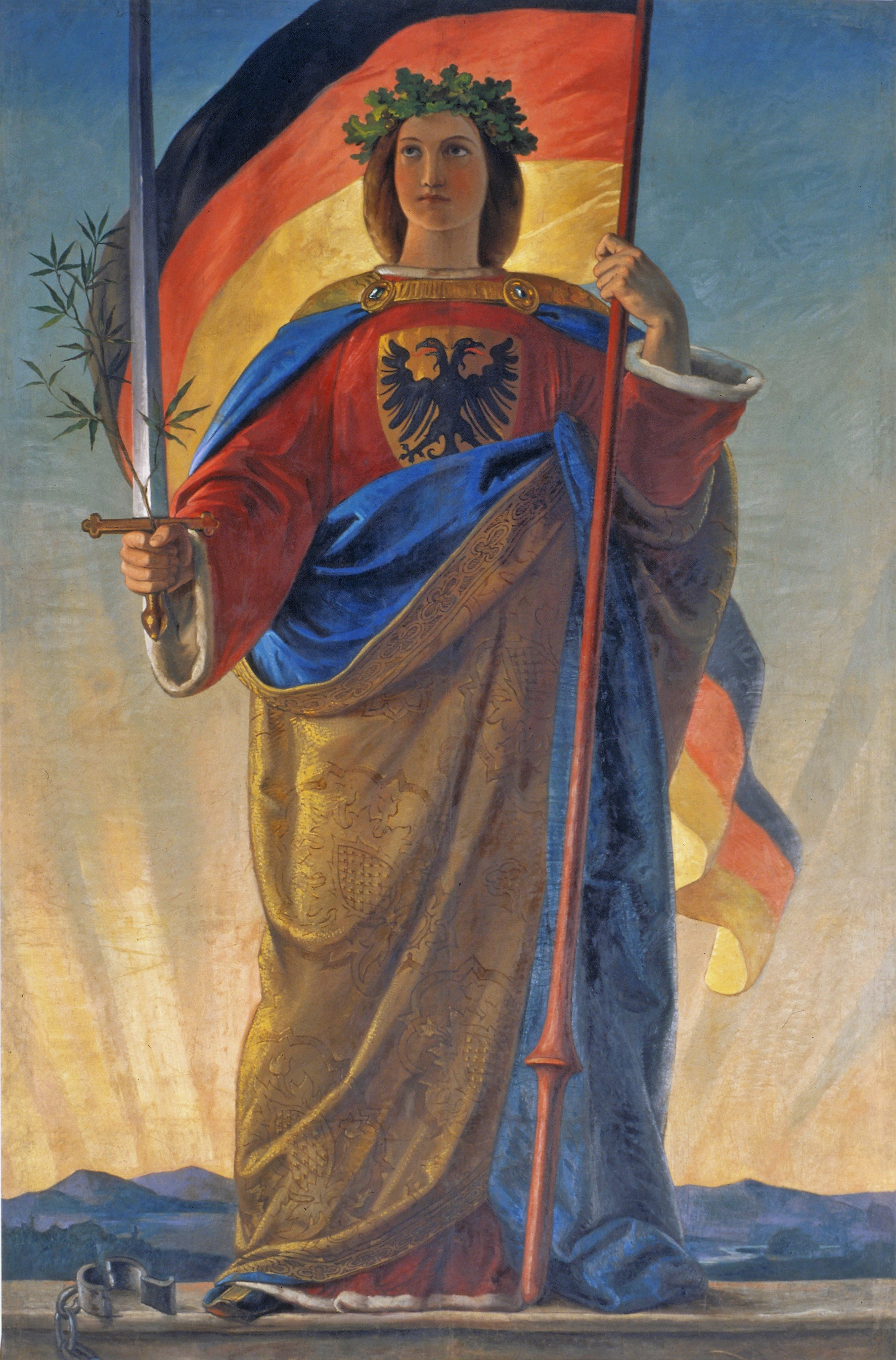
Germania. The painting hung inside the Paulskirche above where the Frankfurt Parliament assembled

In the Springtime of the Peoples during the Revolutions of 1848, revolutionaries took to the streets, many flying the tricolour. The Confederation's Bundestag, alarmed by the events, hasted to adopt the tricolour (9 March 1848). Liberals took power and made the Bundestag call for general elections for a German parliament, the national assembly. This Frankfurt Parliament declared the black-red-gold as the official colours of Germany and passed a law stating its civil ensign was the black-red-yellow tricolour. Also, a naval war ensign used these colours.

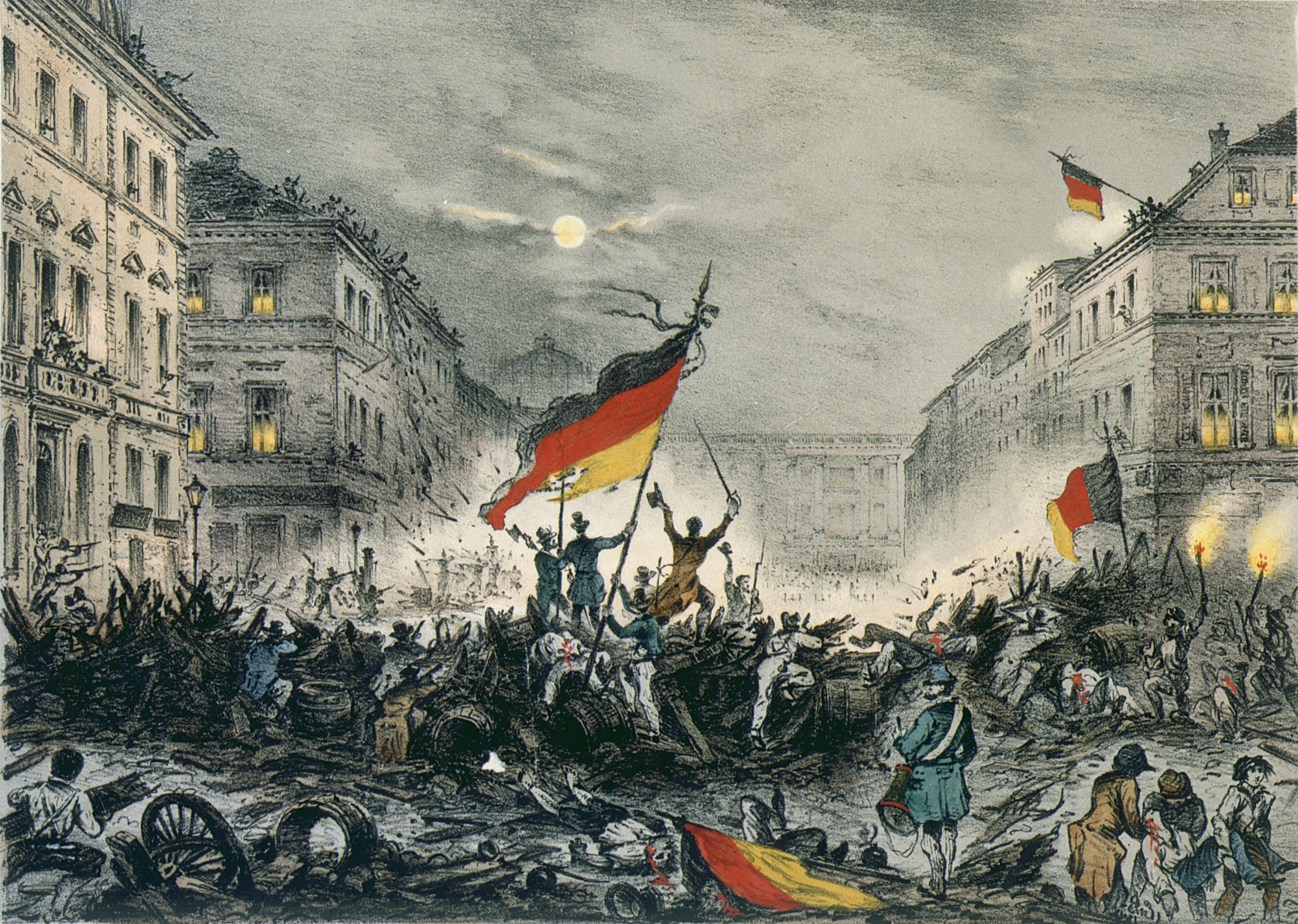
Revolutionaries in Berlin, Berlin Palace in the background (March 1848)

In May 1849, the larger states actively fought the revolution and the Frankfurt parliament. In late 1850, the German Confederation was definitely restored under Austrian-Prussian leadership. The tricolour remained official but was no longer used before 1863 at a conference of the German governments. Afterwards, the most pressing issue was whether or not to include Austria in any future German nation, as Austria's status as a multi-ethnic empire complicated the dream of a united Greater Germany—the grossdeutsch solution. Alternatively, there was the kleindeutsch (Lesser German) solution for a Germany that encompassed only German lands and excluded Austria. The Prussian–Austrian duality within the Confederation eventually led to the Austro-Prussian War in 1866. During the war, the southern states allied with Austria adopted the black-red-gold tricolour as their flag, and the 8th German Army Corps also wore black-red-gold armbands. The Kingdom of Prussia and its predominately north German allies defeated Austria and made way for the realisation of the Lesser German solution a few years later.

=== North German Confederation and the German Empire (1867–1918) ===
North German Confederation and the German Empire
- Use: State flag, civil and state ensign
- Proportion: 2:3 (3:5 in 1933–1935)
- Adopted: 1867; 159 years ago (first 2:3 ratio); 1933; 93 years ago (second 3:5 ratio)
- Relinquished: 1919; 107 years ago (first 2:3 ratio); 1935; 91 years ago (second 3:5 ratio)
- Design: A horizontal tricolour of black, white, and red

Following the dissolution of the German Confederation, Prussia formed its unofficial successor, the North German Confederation, in 1866 with the signing of the Confederation Treaty in August 1866 and then the ratification of the Constitution of 1867. This national state consisted of Prussia, the largest member state, and 21 other north German states.

The question regarding what flag should be adopted by the new confederation was first raised by the shipping sector and its desire to have an internationally recognisable identity. Virtually all international shipping that belonged to the confederation originated from either Prussia or the three Hanseatic city-states of Bremen, Hamburg, and Lübeck. Based on this, Adolf Soetbeer, secretary of the Hamburg Chamber of Commerce, suggested in the Bremer Handelsblatt on 22 September 1866 that any planned flag should combine the colours of Prussia (black and white) with the Hanseatic colours (red and white). In the following year, the constitution of the North German Confederation was enacted, where a horizontal black-white-red tricolour was declared to be both the civil and war ensign.

King Wilhelm I of Prussia was satisfied with the colour choice: the red and white were also taken to represent the Margraviate of Brandenburg, the Imperial elector state that was a predecessor of the Kingdom of Prussia. The absence of gold from the flag also made it clear that this German state did not include the "black and gold" monarchy of Austria. In the Franco-Prussian War, the remaining southern German states allied with the North German Confederation, leading to the unification of Germany. A new constitution of 1871 gave the federal state the new name of German Empire and the Prussian king the title of Emperor. The German Empire retained black, white, and red as its national colours. An ordinance of 1892 dealt with the official use of the colours.

The black-white-red tricolour remained the flag of Germany until the end of the German Empire in 1918, in the final days of World War I.

A visually near-identical flag was used as the national flag of the Republic of Upper Volta, adopted upon the country's independence in 1958 and used until 1984, when the nation was overthrown and re-established as Burkina Faso.

=== Weimar Republic (1918–1933) ===
2:3 Flag of the Weimar Republic (1919–1933)

Merchant flag of the Weimar Republic

Following the declaration of the German republic in 1918 and the ensuing revolutionary period, the so-called Weimar Republic was founded in August 1919. To form a continuity between the anti-autocratic movement of the 19th century and the new democratic republic, the old black-red-gold tricolour was designated as the national German flag in the Weimar Constitution in 1919. Only the tiny German principalities of Reuss-Greiz, where the use and layout of the schwarz-rot-gold design had originated some 140 years earlier, Reuss-Gera, Waldeck-Pyrmont and its republican successor had upheld the 1778-established tradition, and had always continued to use the German colours of black, red, and or (gold) in their flag. As a civil ensign, the black-white-red tricolour was retained, albeit with the new tricolour in the top left corner.

This change was not welcomed by many people in Germany, who saw this new flag as a symbol of humiliation following Germany's defeat in the First World War. In the Reichswehr, the old colours continued to be used in various forms. Many conservatives wanted the old colours to return, while monarchists and the far right were far more vocal with their objections, referring to the new flag with various derogatory names (see Colour above). As a compromise, the old black-white-red flag was reintroduced in 1922 to represent German diplomatic missions abroad.

The symbols of Imperial Germany became symbols of monarchist and nationalist protest and were often used by monarchist and nationalist organisations (e.g. Der Stahlhelm, Bund der Frontsoldaten). This included the Reichskriegsflagge (war flag of the Reich), which has been revived in the present for similar use. Many nationalist political parties during the Weimar period—such as the German National People's Party (see poster) and the National Socialist German Workers Party (Nazi Party)—used the imperial colours, a practice that has continued today with the National Democratic Party of Germany.

On 24 February 1924, the organisation Reichsbanner Schwarz-Rot-Gold was founded in Magdeburg by the member parties of the Weimar Coalition (Centre, DDP, SPD) and the trade unions. This organisation was formed to protect the fragile democracy of the Weimar Republic, which was under constant pressure by both the far right and far left. Through this organisation, the black-red-gold flag became not only a symbol of German democracy, but also of resistance to political extremism. This was summarised by the organisation's first chairman, Otto Hörsing, who described their task as a "struggle against the swastika and the Soviet star".

In the face of the increasingly violent conflicts between the communists and Nazis, the growing polarisation of the German population and a multitude of other factors, mainly the drastic economic sinking, extreme hyperinflation and corruption of the republic, the Weimar Republic collapsed in 1933 with the Nazi seizure of power (Machtergreifung) and the appointment of Adolf Hitler as German chancellor.

=== Nazi Germany and World War II (1933–1945) ===
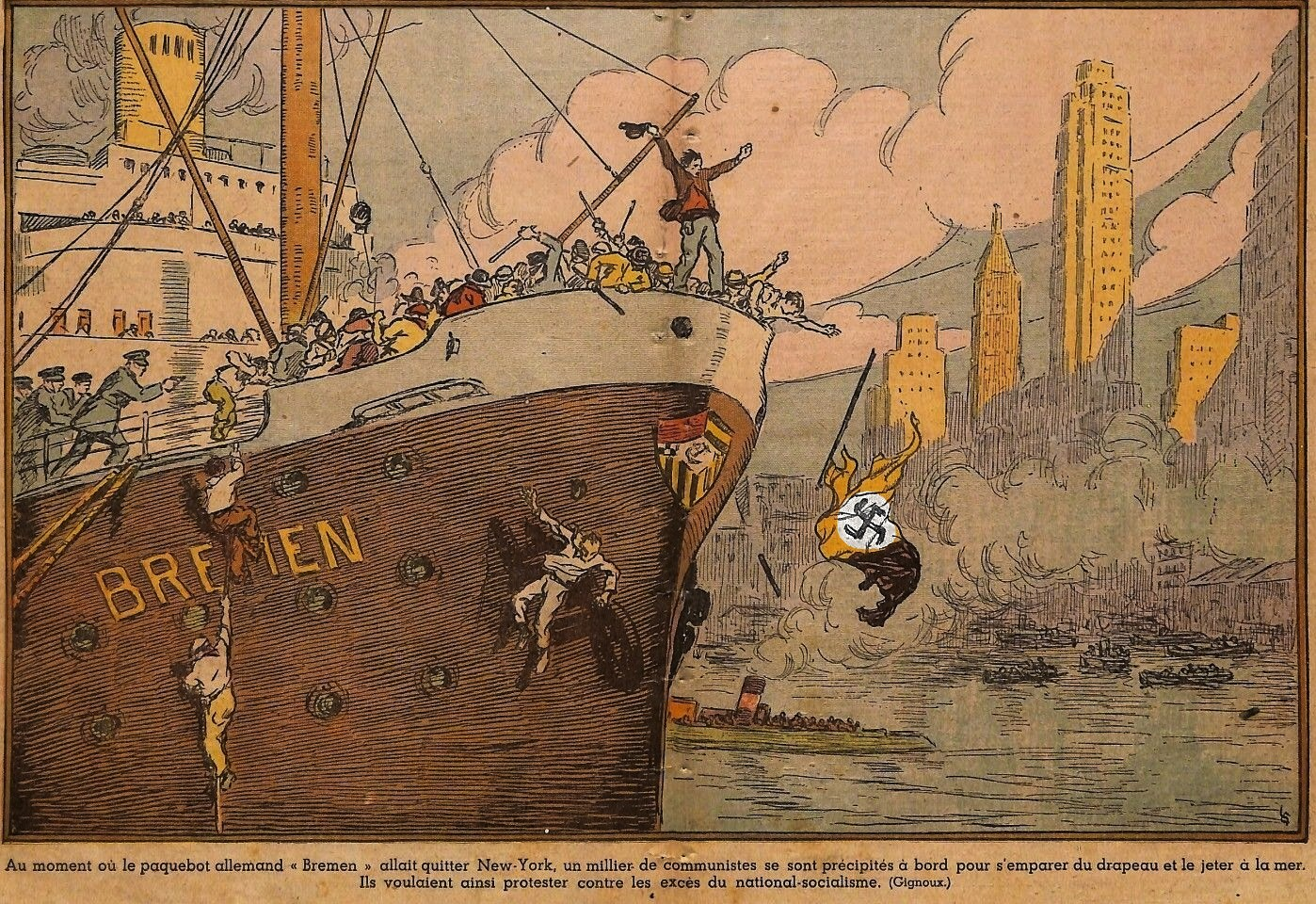
Illustration depicting anti-Nazi demonstrators attacking Bremen docked in New York Harbor, United States on 26 July 1935.

3:5 National flag and ensign of Nazi Germany (1933–1935). It used a slightly different aspect ratio than the previous flag of the German Empire. Along with this flag, the swastika flag of the Nazi Party was ordered to be flown.

3:5 National flag, ensign and naval jack of Nazi Germany (1935–1945). An alternate centre-disc version was the flag of the Nazi Party (1920–1945) and flown jointly with the tricolour national flag (1933–1935).

War flag of Nazi Germany adopted in 1933 and abolished in 1935.

War flag of Nazi Germany adopted in 1935, with some minor changes in 1938, used by the army and navy until 1945.

After Adolf Hitler became leader on 30 January 1933, the black-red-gold flag was banned; a ruling on 12 March established two legal flags: the reintroduced black-white-red imperial tricolour national flag and the flag of the Nazi Party.

On 15 September 1935, one year after the death of Reich President Paul von Hindenburg and Hitler's elevation to the position of Führer, the dual flag arrangement was ended, with the exclusive use of the Nazi flag as the national flag of Germany. One reason may have been the "Bremen incident" of 26 July 1935, in which a group of demonstrators in New York City boarded the ocean liner SS Bremen, tore the Nazi Party flag from the jackstaff, and tossed it into the Hudson River. When the German ambassador protested, US officials responded that the German national flag had not been harmed, only a political party symbol. The new flag law was announced at the annual party rally in Nuremberg, where Hermann Göring claimed the old black-white-red flag, while honoured, was the symbol of a bygone era and under threat of being used by "reactionaries".

The design of the Nazi flag was introduced by Hitler as the party flag in mid-1920, roughly a year before he became his political party's leader: a flag with a red background, a white disk and a black swastika in the middle. In Mein Kampf, Hitler explained the process by which the Nazi flag design was created: It was necessary to use the same colours as Imperial Germany, because in Hitler's opinion they were "revered colours expressive of our homage to the glorious past and which once brought so much honour to the German nation." The most important requirement was that "the new flag ... should prove effective as a large poster" because "in hundreds of thousands of cases a really striking emblem may be the first cause of awakening interest in a movement." Nazi propaganda clarified the symbolism of the flag: the red colour stood for the social, white for the movement's national thinking, and the swastika for the victory of Aryan humanity.

An off-centred disk version of the swastika flag was used as the civil ensign on German-registered civilian ships and was used as the jack on Kriegsmarine (the name of the German Navy, 1933–1945) warships. The flags for use on sea had a through and through image, so the reverse side had a "left-facing" swastika; the national flag was right-facing on both sides.

From 1933 to at least 1938, the Nazis sometimes "sanctified" swastika flags by touching them with the Blutfahne (blood flag), the swastika flag used by Nazi paramilitaries during the failed Beer Hall Putsch in 1923. This ceremony took place at every Nuremberg Rally. It is unknown whether this tradition was continued after the last Nuremberg rally in 1938.

At the end of World War II, the first law enacted by the Allied Control Council abolished all Nazi symbols and repealed all relevant laws. The possession of swastika flags is forbidden in several countries since then, with the importation or display of them forbidden particularly in Germany.

=== After World War II (1945–1949) ===
After the defeat of Germany in World War II, the country was placed under Allied administration. Although there was neither a national German government nor a German flag, German ships were required by international law to have a national ensign of some kind. As a provisional civil ensign of Germany, the Council designated the international signal pennant Charlie representing the letter C ending in a swallowtail, known as the C-Pennant (C-Doppelstander). The Council ruled that "no ceremony shall be accorded this flag which shall not be dipped in salute to warships or merchant ships of any nationality". Similarly, the Japanese civil ensign used immediately following World War II was the signal pennant for the letter E ending in a swallowtail, and the Ryūkyūan civil ensign was a swallowtailed letter D signal pennant.

2:3 The C-Pennant (1946–1949)

West of the Oder–Neisse line, the German states were reorganised along the lines of the zones of occupation, and new state governments were established. Within the American zone, the northern halves of the former states of Württemberg and Baden were merged to form Württemberg-Baden in 1946. As its flag, Württemberg-Baden adopted the black-red-gold tricolour. The choice of these colours was not based on the historical use of the tricolour, but the simple addition of gold to Württemberg's colours of red and black. Coincidentally, Baden's colours were red and yellow, so the colour choice could be mistaken for a combination of the two flags. In 1952, Württemberg-Baden became part of the modern German state of Baden-Württemberg, whose flag is black and gold.

Two other states that were created after the war, Rhineland-Palatinate (French zone) and Lower Saxony (British zone), chose to use the black-red-gold tricolour as their flag, defaced with the state's coat of arms. These two states were formed from parts of other states, and no colour combinations from these previous states were accepted as a new state flag. This led to the use of the black-red-gold for two reasons: the colours did not relate particularly to any one of the previous states, and using the old flag from the Weimar Republic was intended to be a symbol of the new democracy.

=== Divided Germany (1949–1990) ===
3:5 Flag of West Germany and Germany after reunification (1949–present), also flag of East Germany (1949–59)

With relations deteriorating between the Soviet Union and the United States, the three western Allies met in March 1948 to merge their zones of occupation and allow the formation of what became the Federal Republic of Germany, commonly known as West Germany. Meanwhile, the eastern Soviet zone became the German Democratic Republic, commonly known as East Germany. During the preparation of the new constitution for West Germany, discussions regarding its national symbols took place in August 1948 during a meeting at Herrenchiemsee. Although there were objections to the creation of a national flag before reunification with the east, it was decided to proceed. This decision was primarily motivated by the proposed constitution by the eastern SED in November 1946, where black-red-gold were suggested as the colours for a future German republic.

=== Proposed designs ===
Design by Robert Lehr (1948)

"Republican Tricolour" by Paul Wentzcke (1948)

Draft by Edwin Redslob (1948)
The left flag is a variant of Josef Wirmer's "Resistance" design (1944), created by his brother Ernst. The right flag was proposed by conservative parties as a flag for West Germany (1948).

3:5 Flag of East Germany (1959–90)

3:5 Following the reunification of Germany and the fall of the Berlin Wall, many Germans cut out the emblem of East Germany.

Flag of the United Team of Germany, as used from the 1956 to 1964 Olympics

While there were other suggestions for the new flag for West Germany, the final choice was between two designs, both using black-red-gold. The Social Democrats proposed the re-introduction of the old Weimar flag, while the conservative parties such as the CDU/CSU and the German Party proposed a suggestion by Ernst Wirmer, a member of the Parlamentarischer Rat (parliamentary council) and future advisor of chancellor Konrad Adenauer. Wirmer suggested a variant of the 1944 "Resistance" flag (using the black-red-gold scheme in a Nordic Cross pattern) designed by his brother and 20 July co-conspirator Josef. The tricolour was ultimately selected, largely to illustrate the continuity between the Weimar Republic and this new German state. With the enactment of the (West) German constitution on 23 May 1949, the black-red-gold tricolour was readopted as the flag for the Federal Republic of Germany.

In 1955, the inhabitants of the French-administered Saar Protectorate voted to join West Germany. Since its establishment as a separate French protectorate in 1947, the Saar had a white Nordic cross on a blue and red background as its flag. To demonstrate the commitment of the Saar to be a part of West Germany, a new flag was selected on 9 July 1956: the black-red-gold tricolour defaced with the new coat of arms, also proposed on this day. This flag came into force on 1 January 1957, upon the establishment of the Saarland as a state of West Germany.

Logo of the National Committee for a Free Germany used the Reichsflagge (flag of the German Empire)

While the use of black-red-gold had been suggested in the Soviet zone in 1946, the Second People's Congress in 1948 decided to adopt the old black-white-red tricolour as a national flag for East Germany. This choice was based on the use of these colours by the National Committee for a Free Germany, a German anti-Nazi organisation that operated in the Soviet Union in the last two years of the war. In 1949, following a suggestion from Friedrich Ebert, Jr., the black-red-gold tricolour was instead selected as the flag of the German Democratic Republic upon the formation of this state on 7 October 1949. From 1949 to 1959, the flags of both West and East Germany were identical. On 1 October 1959, the East German government changed its flag with the addition of its coat of arms. In West Germany, these changes were seen as a deliberate attempt to divide the two Germanies. Displaying this flag in West Germany and West Berlin—where it became known as the Spalterflagge (divider-flag)—was seen as a breach of the constitution and subsequently banned until the late 1960s.

From 1956 to 1964, West and East Germany attended the Winter and Summer Olympic Games as a single team, known as the United Team of Germany. After the East German national flag was changed in 1959, neither country accepted the flag of the other. As a compromise, a new flag was used by the United Team of Germany from 1960 to 1964, featuring the black-red-gold tricolour defaced with white Olympic rings in the red stripe. In 1968 the teams from the two German states entered separately, but both used the same German Olympic flag. From 1972 to 1988, the separate West and East German teams used their respective national flags.

=== 1990–present ===
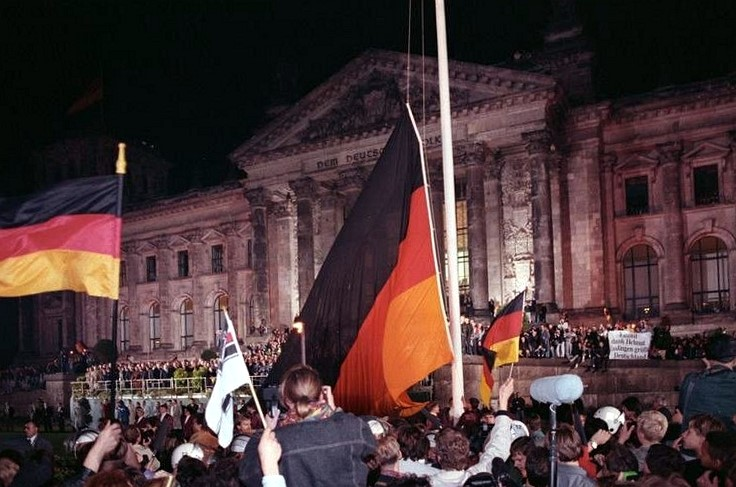
Flag of unified Germany raised at midnight of 3 October 1990 in front of the Reichstag building

After the fall of the Berlin Wall in November 1989, many East Germans removed the coat of arms from their flags to imply the plain black-red-gold tricolour symbolic of a united Germany. The widespread act of removing the coat of arms from the East German flag implied the plain black-red-gold tricolour as symbol for a united and democratic Germany. Finally, on 3 October 1990, as the area of the German Democratic Republic was absorbed into the Federal Republic of Germany, the black-red-gold tricolour became the flag of a reunified Germany. In 1998, the Foundation for the Reappraisal of the SED Dictatorship was formed. The duty of this organisation, directly responsible to the federal government, is to examine the consequences of the former East German regime. As its logo, the foundation used an East German flag with the Communist coat of arms cut out.

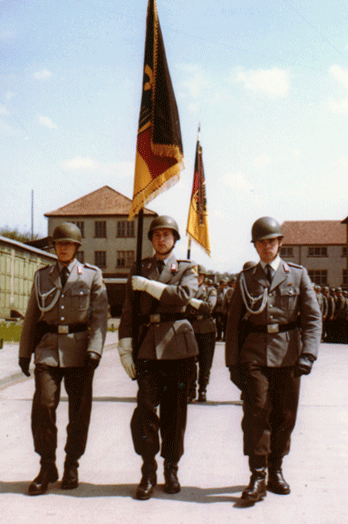
Flag delegation of the Bundeswehr 2008

The old black-white-red tricolour of the German Empire is still used by monarchists and those members of German royalty who long for the peaceful reintroduction of a German democratic monarchy. This use of the old flag is almost completely overshadowed by its prevalent use by the far right, however; since the aforementioned ban on all Nazi symbolism (e.g. the swastika, the Schutzstaffel's (SS) double sig rune, etc.) is still in effect within today's Germany, the far right have been forced to forgo any Nazi flags and instead use the old imperial flag, which the Nazis themselves banned in 1935.

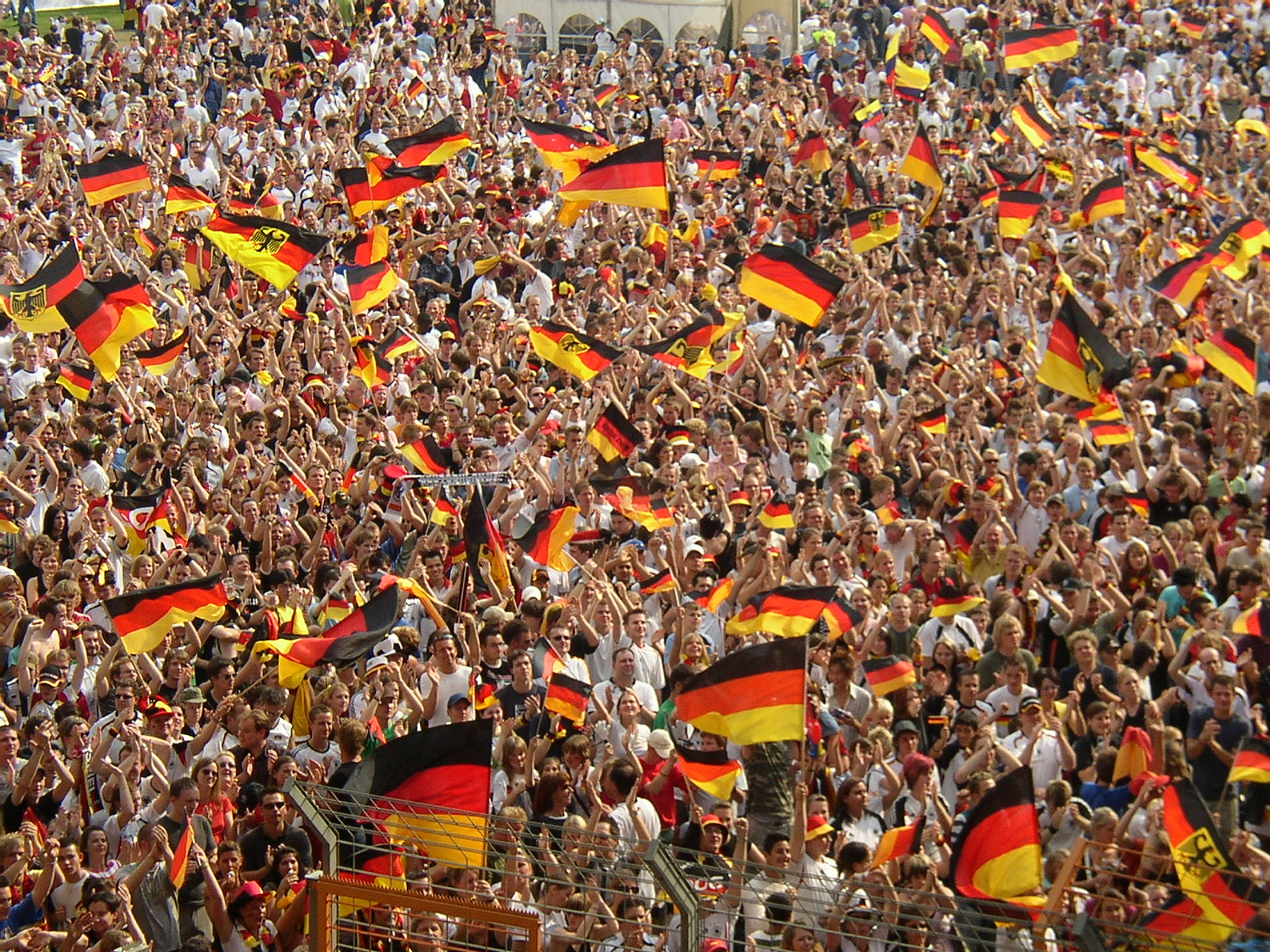
German football fans during a match against Ecuador in the 2006 FIFA World Cup. Some flags seen here contain the federal coat of arms but should not be confused with the Bundesdienstflagge, which displays the Bundesschild and may only be used by government authorities.

In Germany, the use of the flag and other national symbols has been relatively low for most of the time since World War II – a reaction against the widespread use of flags by the Nazi Party and against nationalistic fervour in general. During the 2006 FIFA World Cup, which took place in Germany and in which the Germany national team made a deep run into the knockout rounds (being eliminated in the semi-finals by eventual winners Italy), public use of the national flag increased drastically. This explosion in the flag's occurrence in day-to-day life was initially greeted by many Germans with a mixture of surprise and apprehension. The decades-old fear that German flag-waving and national pride was inextricably associated with its Nazi past was dismissed by the end of the tournament by Germans and non-Germans alike. As many Germans regarded showing their flag as part of support for their own team in the tournament, most flags disappeared after the end of a tournament, sometimes due to administrative decisions.

By the time of Germany's World Cup victory in 2014, usage of the German flag had been increasing sporadically. In the following period the display of the German flag colours, even outside stadiums, was regularly limited to the period of major sporting events.

With the rise of nationalist currents, however, (Pegida, AfD, etc.) and their showing of the German flag as a symbol of their nationalism, the flag again became more widespread but remained somewhat contentious in everyday life. Mainstream society remains hesitant to use the colours.

== See also ==
- Coat of arms of Germany
- Flag of Prussia
- Flags of German states
- Hanseatic flags
- List of German flags
- National colours of Germany
- Reichskriegsflagge
