= Flag of the German Empire =

Reichsflagge
- Use: State flag, civil and state ensign
- Proportion: 2:3 (3:5 in 1933–1935)
- Adopted: 1867; 159 years ago (first 2:3 ratio); 1933; 93 years ago (second 3:5 ratio)
- Relinquished: 1919; 107 years ago (first 2:3 ratio); 1935; 91 years ago (second 3:5 ratio)
- Design: A horizontal tricolor of black, white, and red

The black-white-red flag (Schwarz-Weiß-Rot), also known as the flag of the German Empire, the Imperial Flag (Kaiserflagge) or the Empire Flag (Reichsflagge), is a combination of the flag of Prussia and the flags of the Holy Roman Empire and the Hanseatic League. Starting as the national flag of the North German Confederation, it would go on to be commonly used officially and unofficially under the nation-state of the German Reich, which existed from 1871 to 1945. However, it was only officially adopted as the national flag of the German Empire in 1892, during the reign of Wilhelm II. After 1918, it was used as a political symbol by various organizations.

== Colors ==
=== White-Red ===
The colors white and red are widely used in heraldry. They are particularly prevalent in the coats of arms and flags of the Hanseatic cities, for example, in the coats of arms of Hamburg, Bremen, Lübeck, Rostock, Stralsund, Greifswald, Wismar, Brunswick, and Halberstadt. The Saxon Steed, which carries significant symbolic meaning in Northern Germany and still forms the coats of arms of Lower Saxony and Westphalia, also consists of a white horse on a red shield. Similarly, the Holstein nettle leaf and the coat of arms of Brandenburg are dominated by red and white, and the states of Berlin, Thuringia, and Hesse also use red and white as their state colors.

The colors white and red were also used in the badges and flags of the Holy Roman Empire. The original imperial flag, which first appeared in the 12th century, showed a silver cross on a red field. Around 1350, it was replaced by the royal or imperial eagle banner. Only a red pennant on the imperial war flag still recalled it. The combination black, white, and red, however, was already found in the imperial war flag, the war flag of the Holy Roman Empire. It showed a black and a silver stripe with two crossed red swords on it.

=== White-Black ===
The colors white and black have a long connection to Prussian history. The knights of the Teutonic Order already bore a white shield with a black cross. The important Grand Master of the Teutonic Order, Hermann von Salza, was rewarded with the black imperial eagle from Emperor Frederick II upon his elevation to Prince of the Holy Roman Empire in the Golden Bull of Rimini, which he then displayed on a white shield. This would later become the Prussian eagle coat of arms. The Hohenzollern family, who later ruled Brandenburg and Prussia, had a shield quartered "white and black" as their family coat of arms. In the Kingdom of Prussia, the flags of the provinces of Posen, East Prussia, and West Prussia were also white and black. The Berlin bear, which has been a symbol since the Middle Ages, is traditionally black and adorns the Berlin coat of arms on a white field.

== History ==
=== Unification of Germany ===
Following the dissolution of the German Confederation, Prussia formed its unofficial successor, the North German Confederation, in 1866 with the signing of the Confederation Treaty in August 1866 and then the ratification of the Constitution of 1867. This national state consisted of Prussia, the largest member state, and 21 other north German states.

The question regarding what flag should be adopted by the new confederation was first raised by the shipping sector and its desire to have an internationally recognizable identity. Virtually all international shipping that belonged to the confederation originated from either Prussia or the three Hanseatic city-states of Bremen, Hamburg, and Lübeck. Based on this, Adolf Soetbeer, secretary of the Hamburg Chamber of Commerce, suggested in the Bremer Handelsblatt on 22 September 1866 that any planned flag should combine the colors of Prussia (black and white) with the Hanseatic colors (red and white). In the following year, the constitution of the North German Confederation was enacted under the leadership of Otto von Bismarck, where a horizontal black-white-red tricolor was declared to be both the civil and war ensign.

King Wilhelm I of Prussia was satisfied with the color scheme: red and white would also represent the Margraviate of Brandenburg, the Imperial elector state that was a predecessor of the Kingdom of Prussia. The absence of gold from the flag also made it clear that this German state did not include the "black and gold" monarchy of the Austrian Empire. In the Franco-Prussian War, the remaining southern German states allied with the North German Confederation, leading to the unification of Germany. A new constitution of 1871 gave the federal state the new name of German Empire and the Prussian king the title of Emperor. The German Empire retained black, white, and red as its national colors. It was only officially adopted as the national flag of the German Empire in 1892, during the reign of Wilhelm II. It would continue using it until the German Revolution of 1918–1919, which resulted in the founding of the Weimar Republic.

=== Weimar Republic and Nazi Germany ===
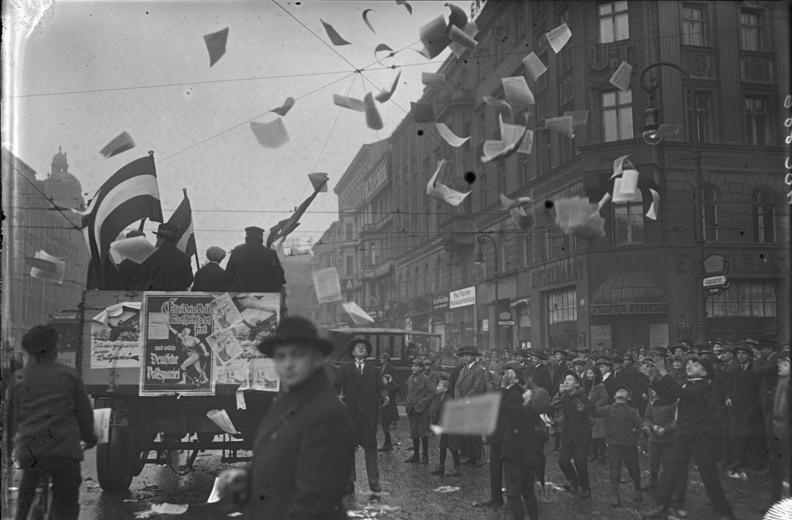
The German People's party flying the Reichsflagge, campaigning for the Reichstag election of December 1924

The Weimar Republic did not use it as a national flag though it did see use within the Reichswehr and by many paramilitary organizations including the Freikorps. It would see usage by right-wing conservative and liberal political parties, including the German National People's Party and the German People's Party. German nationalists used the black-white-red flag to protest against the Weimar Republic during the 1920s and 1930s. This included the 1920 attempt to overthrow the Weimar Republic known as the Kapp Putsch.

Immediately after the electoral victory of the Nazi Party in March 1933, German President Paul von Hindenburg reinstated the black-white-red flag by decree as the national flag of Germany. It is worth noting, however, that the swastika flag of the Nazi Party was to be flown along with this flag. In September 1935, a year after Hindenburg's death and Adolf Hitler's elevation to the rank of Führer, the swastika flag became the national flag of Germany; the old imperial flag was deemed "reactionary", and banned.

=== World War II ===
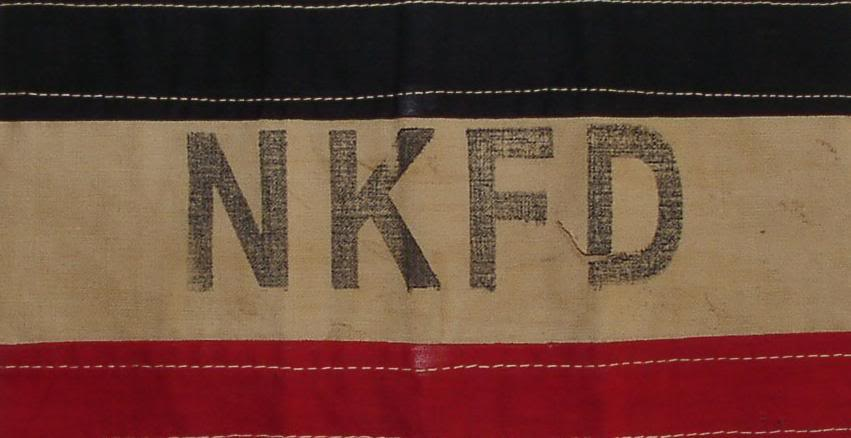
A variation of armband design used by the National Committee for a Free Germany

During World War II, German prisoners of war who had defected to the Soviet Union and German exiles in the Soviet Union, mainly the members of the Communist Party of Germany, formed the National Committee for a Free Germany, an anti-fascist military and political organization which sought to overthrow the Nazi regime and aided the Red Army in various ways, including the combat against the Wehrmacht, and adopted the black-white-red flag as their symbol and as a flag for a possible democratic German state after the overthrow of Hitler. The main reason for the choice was the rejection of the Weimar Republic by the organization, since the prisoners of war who constituted the majority of the organization were highly critical of the Weimar Germany and said that initially they supported the Nazis only because of their disgust or hatred towards the "weakness" of the Weimar Republic, and the Communists agreed with them. The manifesto of the organization included criticisms of the "powerless" Weimar Republic and contrasted it to the future democratic state, a "truly popular" democratic government strong enough to crush the remains of the Nazi regime. The other reason was that the KPD leaders wanted to reassure its majority that the NKFD was not a Communist outfit but a union with all kind of views opposed to Nazism. The black-white-red flag became the flag of the organization and was used in its propaganda materials and on the armbands worn by the members of the organization.

Many members of this organization would play a role in the Soviet occupation and organization of the East German government. Due to this, the Imperial Flag was proposed as a national flag for East Germany by those who saw it as a symbol of German resistance to Nazism and by those who saw the black-red-gold tricolor as a symbol of the failed Weimar Republic. However, the East German government ultimately adopted the black-red-gold flag, later adding the country's coat of arms to distinguish it from the otherwise identical West German flag.

=== After German Reunification ===
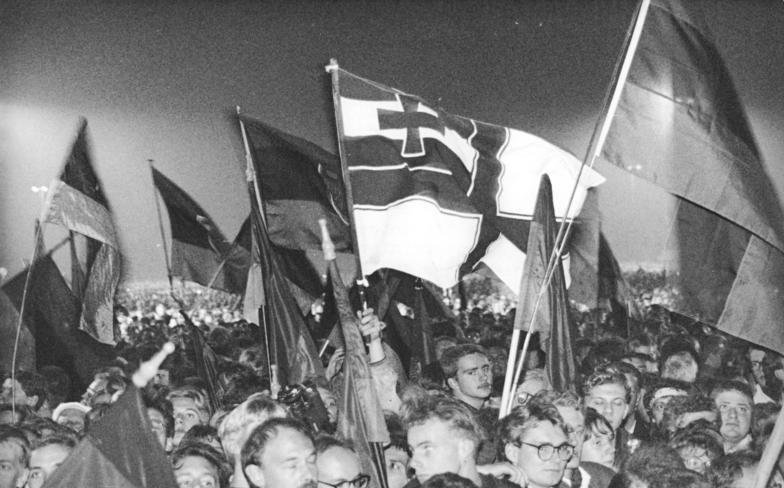
Homemade Reichskriegsflagge at German reunification in Berlin in 1990

After the reunification of Germany, the black-white-red flag remained as a symbol among right-wing monarchist organizations and the far-right in Germany. Due to the ban on Nazi swastika flag in modern Germany, many German Neo-Nazis instead adopted the Imperial Flag. However, the flag never originally had any racist or anti-Semitic meaning, despite its brief use in Nazi Germany. Among the right wing the flag typically represents a rejection of the Federal Republic.

== Gallery ==
=== War ensigns and jacks ===
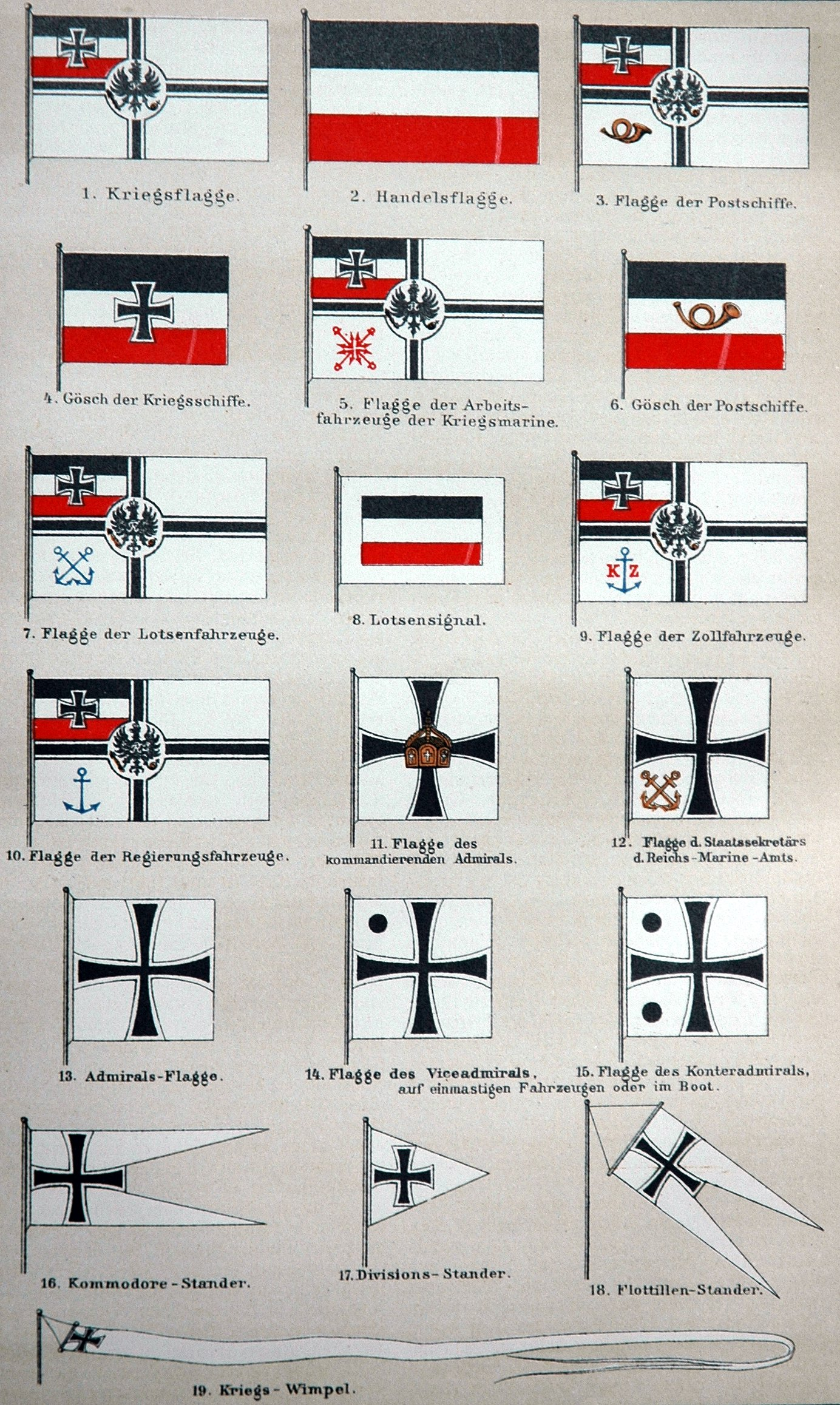
Flags of the Imperial Navy, based on the naval flags of the North German Confederation

War Ensign of Germany (1867–1892)

War Ensign of Germany (1903–1919)

War Ensign of Germany (1903–1919) - Variant

Proposed war ensign (1919-1921) - never officially used

War Ensign of Germany (1921–1933)

Jack of North German Confederation and German Empire (1866–1903)

Jack of North German Confederation and German Empire (1866–1903) - 3:5 Variant

=== National flags ===
Flag of the North German Confederation and German Empire (1867–1918)

Flag of Nazi Germany (1933–1935)

=== Service flags and other ===
Flag of the Imperial Colonial Office (1907–1919)

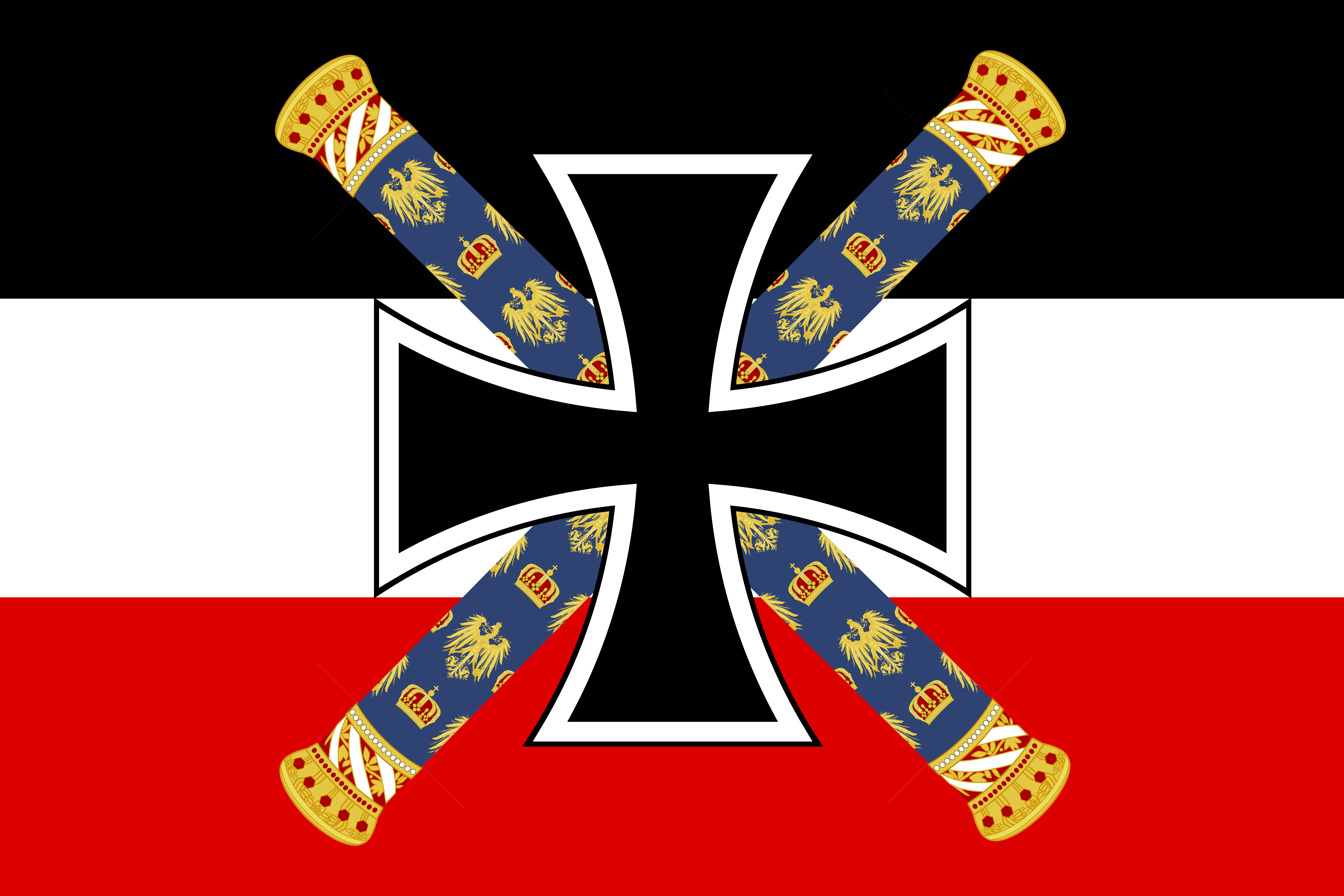
Command symbol of the supreme commander in China (1900–1901)

Service flag of the Reich authorities at sea (1921–1926)

Service Flag of the Reich (1933–1935)

Reich service flag of the Imperial Navy

Flag of the mail ships (German Empire, 1892–1918)

Service flag for the “Other administrative branches of the Reich”, (1893–1919)

Merchant flag of the German Empire with the Iron Cross, (1896–1918)

== See also ==
- German Reich
- German conservatism
- Reichsbürger movement
- State of the Teutonic Order
- The Black Channel
- German Party (1947)
- German Empire Party
- Freikorps
- Black-yellow-white flag of the Russian Empire
- Prince's Flag
- Flag of Upper Volta
- Arab Liberation Flag
  - Flag of Egypt
  - Flag of Iraq
  - Flag of Sudan
  - Flag of Yemen
