= National colours of Germany =

National symbol of Germany

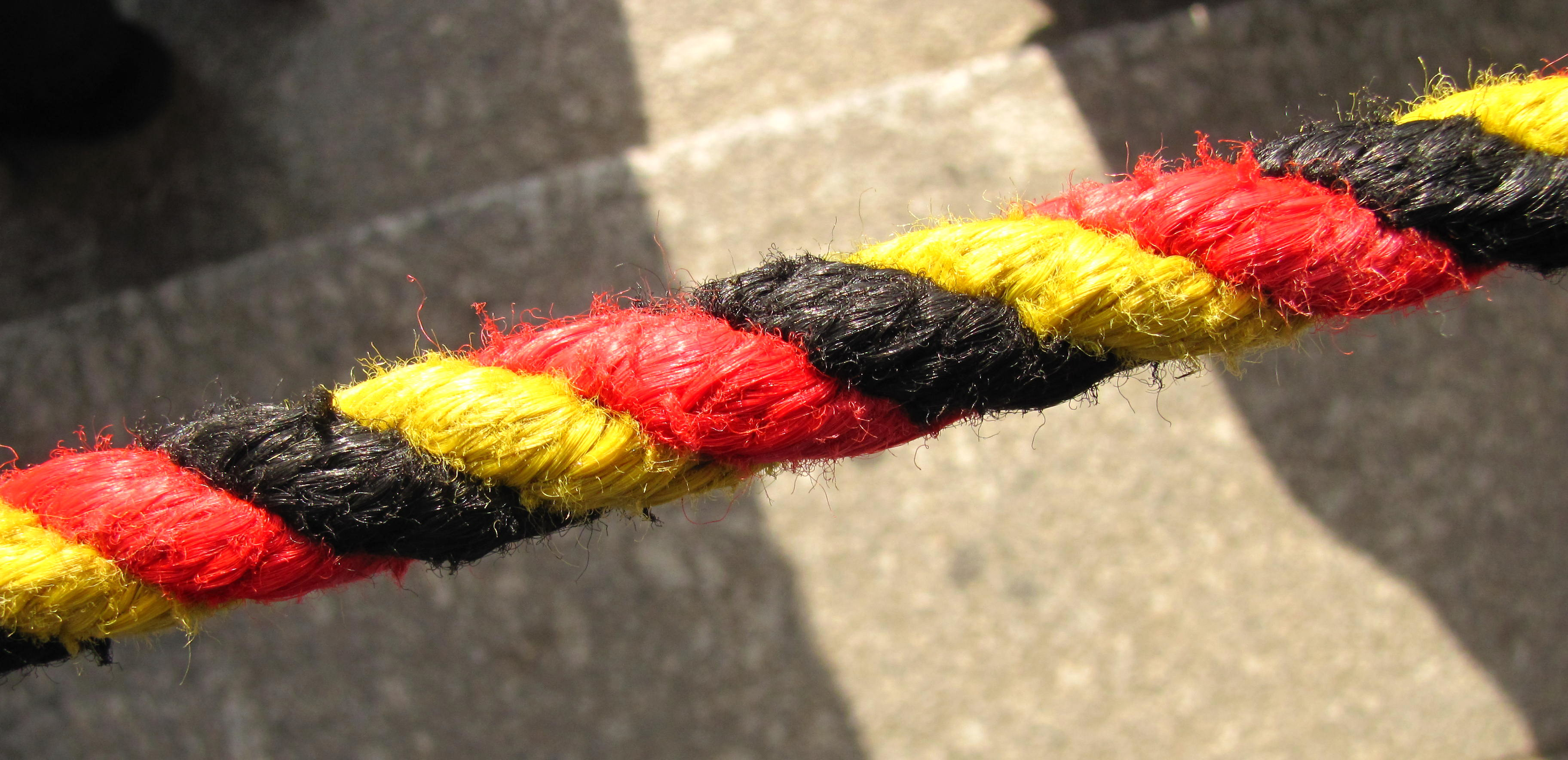
Black, red, and gold barrier cord at the German Bundestag parliament

The national colours of the Federal Republic of Germany are officially black, red, and gold, defined with the adoption of the West German flag as a tricolour with these colours in 1949. Germany was divided into West Germany and East Germany from 1949 to 1990, and both Germanies retained the black, red, and gold colors on their respective flags. After German reunification in 1990, the united Germany retained the West German flag, thus retaining black, red, and gold as Germany's colors.

The colours ultimately hark back to the tricolour adopted by the Urburschenschaft of Jena in 1815, representing an early phase in the development of German nationalism and the idea of a unified German state. Since the 1860s, there has been a competing tradition of national colours as black, white, and red, based on the Hanseatic flags, used as the flag of the North German Confederation and the German Empire. The Weimar Republic in 1919 opted to re-introduce the black, red, and gold tricolour. This was controversial, and as a compromise, the old flag was reintroduced in 1922 to represent German diplomatic missions abroad. As a reaction, Reichsbanner Schwarz-Rot-Gold was an organization formed in 1924 representing the parties supporting parliamentary democracy, and for the remainder of the existence of the Weimar Republic, black-red-gold represented the centrist parties supporting parliamentary and black-white-red represented its nationalist and monarchist opposition.

== Black, red, and gold ==
=== Imperial origins ===
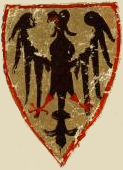
Coat of arms of Emperor Henry VI, Codex Manesse

The Reichsbanner of the Holy Roman Emperors as used from the 15th century

The choice of black, red, and gold as national colours was retrospectively motivated by occurrence of this combination of colours in the medieval coat of arms of the Holy Roman Emperors, the black Reichsadler in a golden field used since the 12th century. The imperial colours black and gold were adopted by many imperial cities to underline their immediacy. The colours black, red, and gold were supposedly used at the election of Frederick Barbarossa as King of the Romans on 4 March 1152 in Frankfurt. According to contemporary sources, the new king's way from Frankfurt Cathedral to the Römer square was covered with a coloured carpet, which was afterwards cut into numerous small parts and distributed to the crowds. A red-clawed, -beaked and -tongued imperial eagle was used from the 14th century onwards, as depicted in the Codex Manesse about 1304.

The Habsburg monarchy used the colours black and gold as its dynastic flag from about 1700; when emperor Francis II abdicated from the throne in 1806, he adopted the colours as the flag of his Austrian Empire.

The black-red-gold tricolour's first known appearance on a state flag, anywhere in a German-ethnicity sovereign state within what today comprises Germany, occurred in 1778. Following this documented "first-use" by the reigning house of Reuss of the modern tricolor combination, the connection of the black-red-gold tricolour with the Reichsbanner design appears to have been made as early as during the March Revolution. Ferdinand Freiligrath in his poem Schwarz-Rot-Gold, published 1851 and dated 17 March 1848, has the lines Das ist das alte Reichspanier, Das sind die alten Farben! ("This is the old imperial banner, these are the old colours!"), and in addition provides a symbolism for the colours as Pulver ist schwarz, Blut ist rot, Golden flackert die Flamme! ("Gunpowder is black, blood is red, golden flares the flame!").

Communist authors also attributed use of the colours by insurgents of the 1525 German Peasants' War, so Friedrich Engels in his The Peasant War in Germany (1850, p. 91), and Albert Norden, Um die Nation (1953, p. 17).

=== Wars of Liberation ===
Urburschenschaft banner (replica)

Uniforms of the Lützow Free Corps during the German campaign (1813–1814) against French occupation under Napoleon also consisted of a combination of black, red, and gold—though mainly for functional reasons: the corps under command of the Prussian major Ludwig Adolf Wilhelm von Lützow was made up of volunteer university students from all over Germany, whose varied clothing was uniformly coloured in black, festooned with common brass knobs and red facings. The Uhlan forces used red and black lance pennons.

Black, red, and gold – if even in reverse order compared to nowadays, i.e. gold at the top – resembling the former imperial colours soon became symbols of the German struggle for freedom, symbolizing the road from servitude (black) through bloody fight (red) to the stars (gold), similar to the famous saying per aspera ad astra (to the stars through difficulties). This interpretive culture was perpetuated in the memory of venerated martyrs like Theodor Körner. The red and black colours with a golden oak leaf cluster were adopted as couleur by the first German national Urburschenschaft student fraternity established on 12 June 1815 in Jena, and publicly displayed on the 1817 Wartburg Festival.

The students' hopes of a national awakening dashed with the implementation of the German Confederation, not a nation state but a loose federation of the German monarchs, who by the 1819 reactionary Carlsbad Decrees banned any fraternity activities. Since then the black-red-gold tricolour became a widespread symbol of the pursuit of liberty, democracy and liberal unity, thus the colours were used on horizontal tricolour flags by Lützow veterans and other democratic revolutionaries of the Hambach Festival in 1832, and in the Revolutions of 1848.

=== Revolutions of 1848 ===
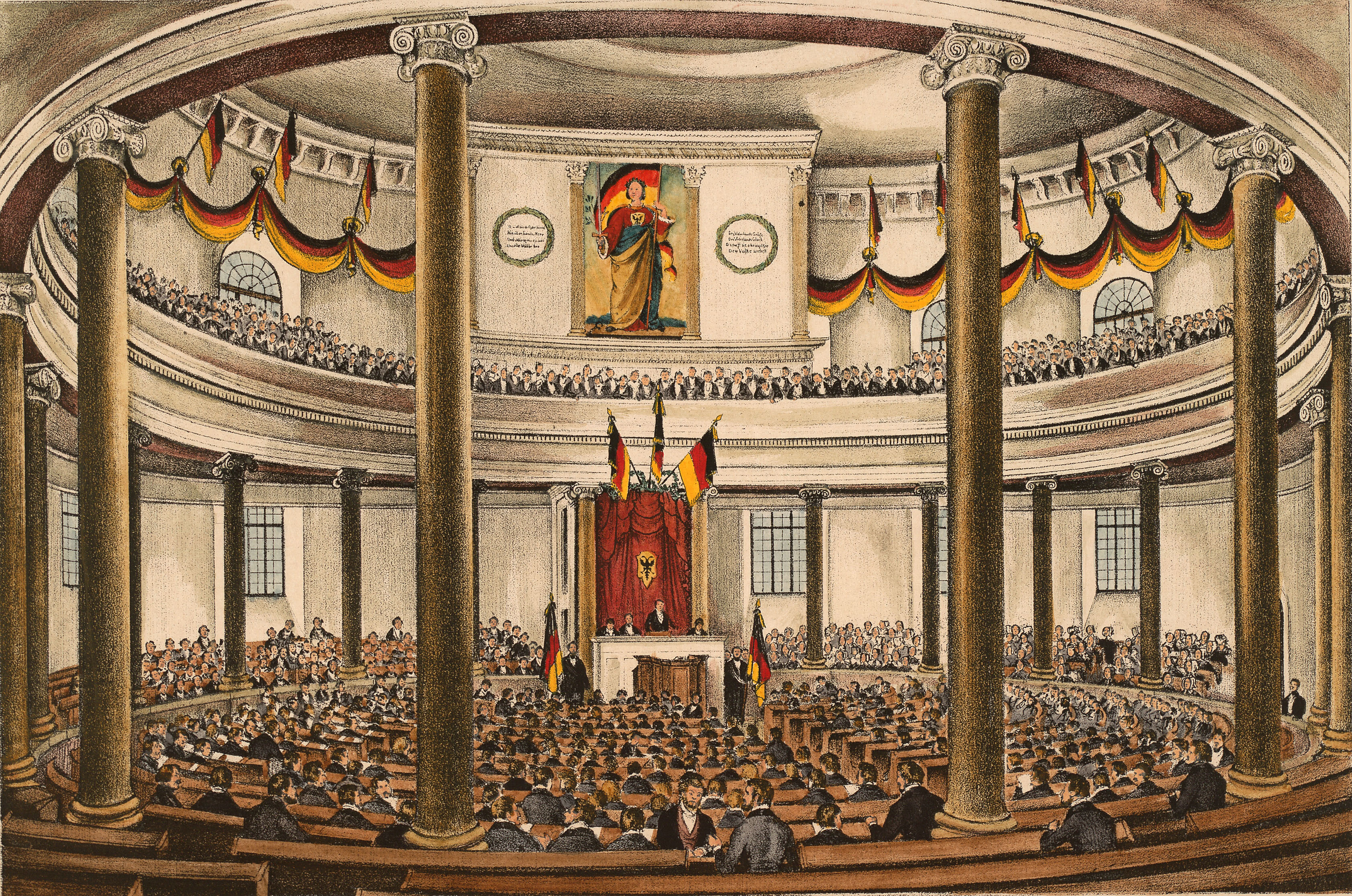
Frankfurt Parliament, St. Paul's Church, decorated with Germania

As a result of the 1848 revolutions, the Federal Convention of the German Confederation, which had continued the use of the Imperial Eagle coat of arms in 1815, also adopted the tricolour ("from German time immemorial") in order to steady the nationalist unrest. Emperor Ferdinand I of Austria had the Black, Red, and Gold flag hoisted on St. Stephen's Cathedral, Vienna and showed himself with the flag on a window of Hofburg Palace. In Berlin, King Frederick William IV of Prussia had to bow to the fallen insurgents of the liberation movement and to wear a Black, Red and Gold armband while riding through the city.

When on 18 May 1848 the Frankfurt Parliament first convened, the city streets were decorated in the "German colours" like the assembly room in St. Paul's Church. On November 12, the parliament passed a resolution whereafter black-red-gold became the German war and merchant flag. However, as official flag of the German Confederation, the tricolour was mainly used in the small Imperial fleet (Reichsflotte), which was dissolved by 1852. The Frankfurt Constitution, adopted in 1849 and never carried into effect, omitted any provision of national symbols. After the dissolution of the Frankfurt Parliament, the tricolour vanished from public space. Mocked by Heinrich Heine as "old Germanic rubbish", it nevertheless remained the official flag of the German Confederation, "revitalized" in 1866 as the banner of Austria and her allies in the War with Prussia and the North German states.

== Black, white, and red ==
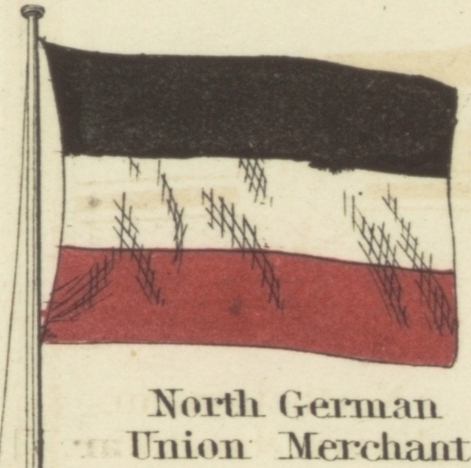
North German merchant flag, 1868

After the war and the breakup of the German Confederation, the Prussian-led North German Confederation was established at the instance of Minister-President Otto von Bismarck to answer the German question. Another colour scheme was desired, as the black and gold colours were associated with Habsburg Austria. From 1867, the black, white, and red colours became the flag of the newly established federated state; the tricolour derived from the combination of the Prussian black and white with the white and red flag of the North German Hanseatic League.

Since the 13th century, a black cross on white coat had been carried by medieval Teutonic Knights which had founded the State of the Teutonic Order in Prussia. Their Grand Master Hermann von Salza received the rights to bear the imperial black eagle by the 1226 Golden Bull of Rimini, issued by Emperor Frederick II, to indicate that he enjoyed imperial immediacy as a Prince of the Holy Roman Empire. When the Teutonic state was secularized in 1525 as the Duchy of Prussia, the black eagle on a white shield became the Prussian coat of arms. The ruling House of Hohenzollern also had a black and white family coat of arms.

In addition to the black and white of Prussia, the white and red colours of the former Hanseatic League were added. Even though this medieval international trade organization had lost its influence over two centuries earlier, the city-states of Bremen, Hamburg, and Lübeck, all former Free Imperial Cities, took pride in their centuries-old Hanseatic tradition. The navy commander Prince Adalbert of Prussia strongly advocated the implementation of a combined tricolour of Prussian black and white and Hanseatic white and red as a war flag and a civil ensign. Bismarck ("I don't care whatsoever about those colors! Whatever, green and yellow and dancing pleasure, or the flag of Mecklenburg-Strelitz...") made no objections.

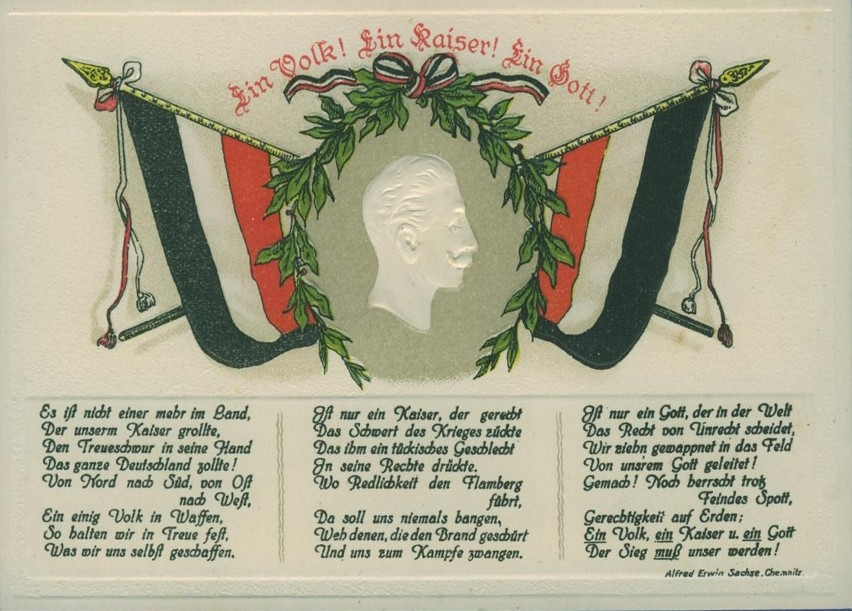
"One People! One Emperor! One God!", German postcard, about 1900

From the 1871 German unification until 1918, black, white, and red were widely accepted as the national colours of the German Empire, though they were not officially adopted as the imperial flag by law before 1892. Numerous German associations embraced the patriotic tricolour, and sports organisations that were founded prior to World War I often choose white with additional black and/or red as their colours.

== State colours ==
In the German Revolution of 1918–19, the "imperialist" black, white, and red were abandoned in favour of the "democratic" black, red, and gold colours of 1848. In view of Germany's unfortunate position after the lost war and under the terms of the Versailles Treaty, monarchist and German National forces advocated the retention of the imperial colours as a matter of national pride. Since then, and up to today, black, white, and red are often associated with right wing radicalism because of their use by right wing parties and in far-right circles.

=== Weimar Republic ===
Though even liberal deputies in the Weimar National Assembly spoke against a change of colours, Article 3 of the German Constitution of 11 August 1919 determined black, red, and gold both for the tricolour national flag and the eagle coat of arms of the Weimar Republic. Considering the preceding debates however, the former black, white, and red colours were retained as the German civil ensign, with black, red, and gold in the upper left corner. Not until 1922, the Reichskriegsflagge banner was officially outlawed on ships of the German Navy. The official black, red, and gold colours were refused by wide circles in the Reichswehr armed forces and World War I veterans' associations.

The issue of the national colours was, however, continuously debated in the German society. Studentenverbindung organisations emphasized the Greater German meaning of black, red, and gold, which had actually been frustrated by the Allied Powers prohibiting the accession of German-Austria to Germany. Most of the centrist political parties were in favour of the new colours, but many people of different political views still felt that black, white, and red were the true colours of Germany. The flag of the Weimar Republic was insulted by conservatives and nationalists, Communists and Nazis alike, who sometimes referred to it as "black-red-yellow" or even "black-red-mustard", if not even worse. In 1921, even Gustav Stresemann, chairman of the national liberal German People's Party argued for the reintroduction of black, white, and red. In May 1926, the German government of Chancellor Hans Luther had to resign after a quarrel over the display of flags at German embassies.

To encounter antidemocratic forces, the Reichsbanner Schwarz-Rot-Gold society was founded by members of the Social Democratic Party of Germany, the Catholic Centre Party, and the liberal German Democratic Party in 1924. Led by the Social Democrat Otto Hörsing, the defined goal of the organisation was to defend the colours and the parliamentary values they represented. Initially a league of World War I veterans, the Reichsbanner soon evolved to a mass organisation with a membership of more than three million. Increasingly attacked by the Sturmabteilung, Der Stahlhelm paramilitary groups, it joined forces with the Allgemeiner Deutscher Gewerkschaftsbund and Allgemeiner freier Angestelltenbund trade unions to form the democratic Iron Front. With the Weimar democracy, the black, red, and gold colours went down fighting.

=== Nazi rule ===
Upon the Nazi Party's Machtergreifung when Adolf Hitler came to power in January 1933, the "democratic" colours quickly fell out of use, though they were not officially abolished. The Nazis preferred the old imperial colours of black, white, and red, and then their own party symbol, the swastika flag, which also used a combination of black, white, and red colours, but not in the same way as the old flag of the German Empire. Instead, red was the dominant colour. Hitler added new symbolism to the colours, stating that "[t]he red expressed the social thought underlying the movement. White the national thought", and that the black swastika was an emblem of the "Aryan race" and "the ideal of creative work which is in itself and always will be anti-Semitic."

The black-red-gold tricolour flag of the Weimar Republic was banned on 14 March 1933 and initially replaced by the old black-white-red tricolour of the German Empire as the national flag. At the same time, the swastika flag of the Nazi Party was introduced as the official flag, mandatory for use in parallel with the national flag. The quickness with which the change of the national colours took place was evidenced by the fact that Reich President Paul von Hindenburg by order of 7 March 1933, just two days after the German federal election, instructed the authorities to fly black-white-red flags as official decorations on for the upcoming Volkstrauertag public holiday (13 March).

After Hindenburg's death on 2 August 1934, Hitler styled himself Führer and Reich Chancellor. The position of the Nazi Party seemed so solid that further measures could be taken towards the unification of party and state. In the course of this unification, the Nazi swastika flag was elevated to the rank of the national flag of Nazi Germany. The main reason for this change is said to have been that on 26 July 1935 in New York a group of anti-Nazi demonstrators boarded the SS Bremen, tore the Nazi flag from the jackstaff and threw it into the Hudson River. The German ambassador sharply protested, but the protest was rejected, with the statement that only a political party symbol was desacrated and the national flag was not affected. On 15 September 1935, in response to this incident, the Reichsflaggengesetz (Reich Flag Law) came into effect, declaring the Nazi Party swastika to be the national flag and civil ensign of Germany and banning usage of the black, white, and red flag of the German Empire because of its "reactionary nature". National conservative protests had become silent. In a speech, Reichstag president Hermann Göring called the black, white, and red flag of the German Empire a "honorably pulled down".

=== Post-war ===
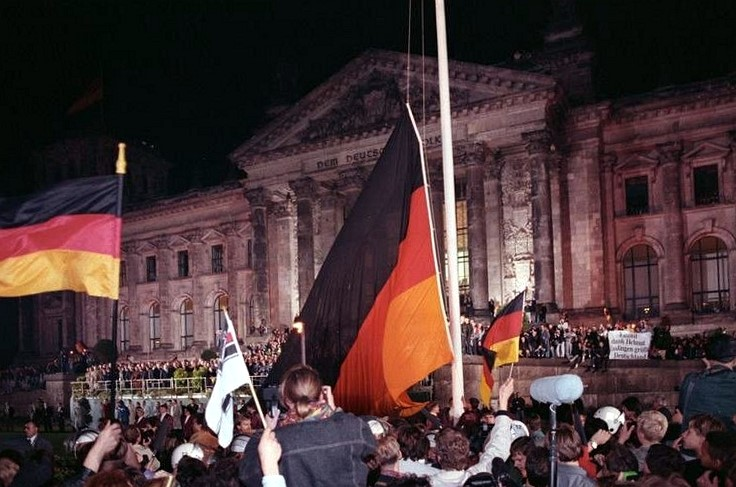
The German Unity Flag is raised as national memorial to German reunification in front of the Reichstag in Berlin on 3 October 1990.

After World War II, Germany was occupied and divided. Both new states founded in 1949, the Federal Republic of Germany (West Germany) and the German Democratic Republic (East Germany), once again took up the "democratic" colours of black, red, and gold from the Weimar Republic, with the GDR modifying it by adding their own socialist symbols to their flag in 1959. As a compromise, the Olympic United Team of Germany, which had first competed in 1956, had to add white Olympic rings to the flag for the games of 1960 and 1964, and also for 1968 when two separate German teams entered under common symbols. After the fall of the Berlin Wall in 1989, East German citizens cut out the socialist symbols of the East German flag in order to show support for a unification with West Germany, which had also continued the use of the traditional eagle coat of arms, called Bundesadler.

In the Federal Republic of Germany (since 1949), and especially after the 1960s, only very far-right parties use black, white, and red, especially radical conservatives and neo-Nazis. Right-wing populist and national conservative parties, for example The Republicans, pointedly display black, red, and gold in their logo. Beside the right-wing extremists only the very small group of monarchists display the old colours.

== Use of colours in sports ==
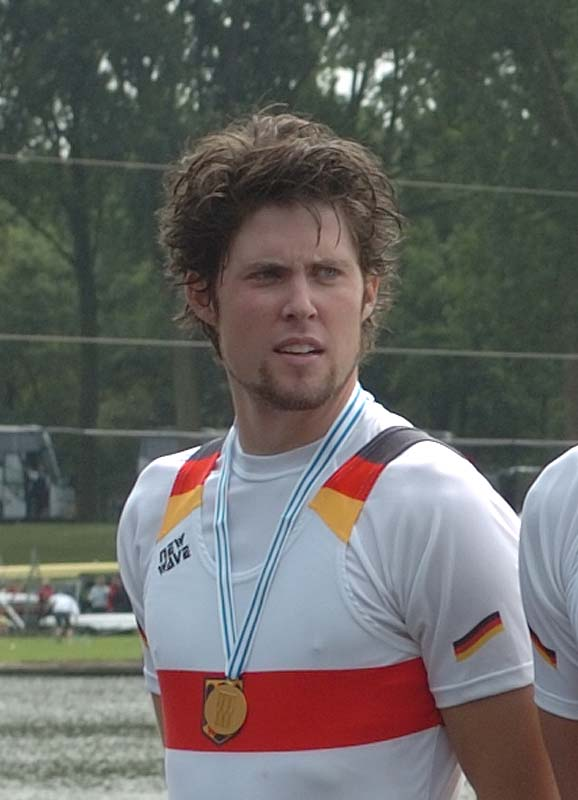
German rower Richard Nagel, wearing white with a red chest band

German sports teams often use white as a main colour, as organisations that had been founded prior to 1919 often have chosen the Prussian colours: white with additional black and sometimes red. Examples are the Germany national football team fielded by the German Football Association (DFB) since 1908, German track and field athletes and rowers who use a red chest band, and German race cars, which were, according to the international auto racing colour scheme, painted white with red numbers (since 1934, Mercedes-Benz and Auto Union have used unpainted metal, or silver).

Between 1918 and 1933, and after 1945, black-red-gold again became the national colours. Organisations founded in that time frame, such as the German American football Association (AFVD) or the German Organisation of Non-Olympic sports (IGNOV), often use black-red-gold in their colours, mostly on a white background. In recent years, most national teams of older organisations have added black-red-gold trim to their uniforms.

Germany national football team

== See also ==
- Flag of Germany
- List of flags of Germany
- Flags of German states
