= Imperial law regarding the introduction of a German war and civil ensign =

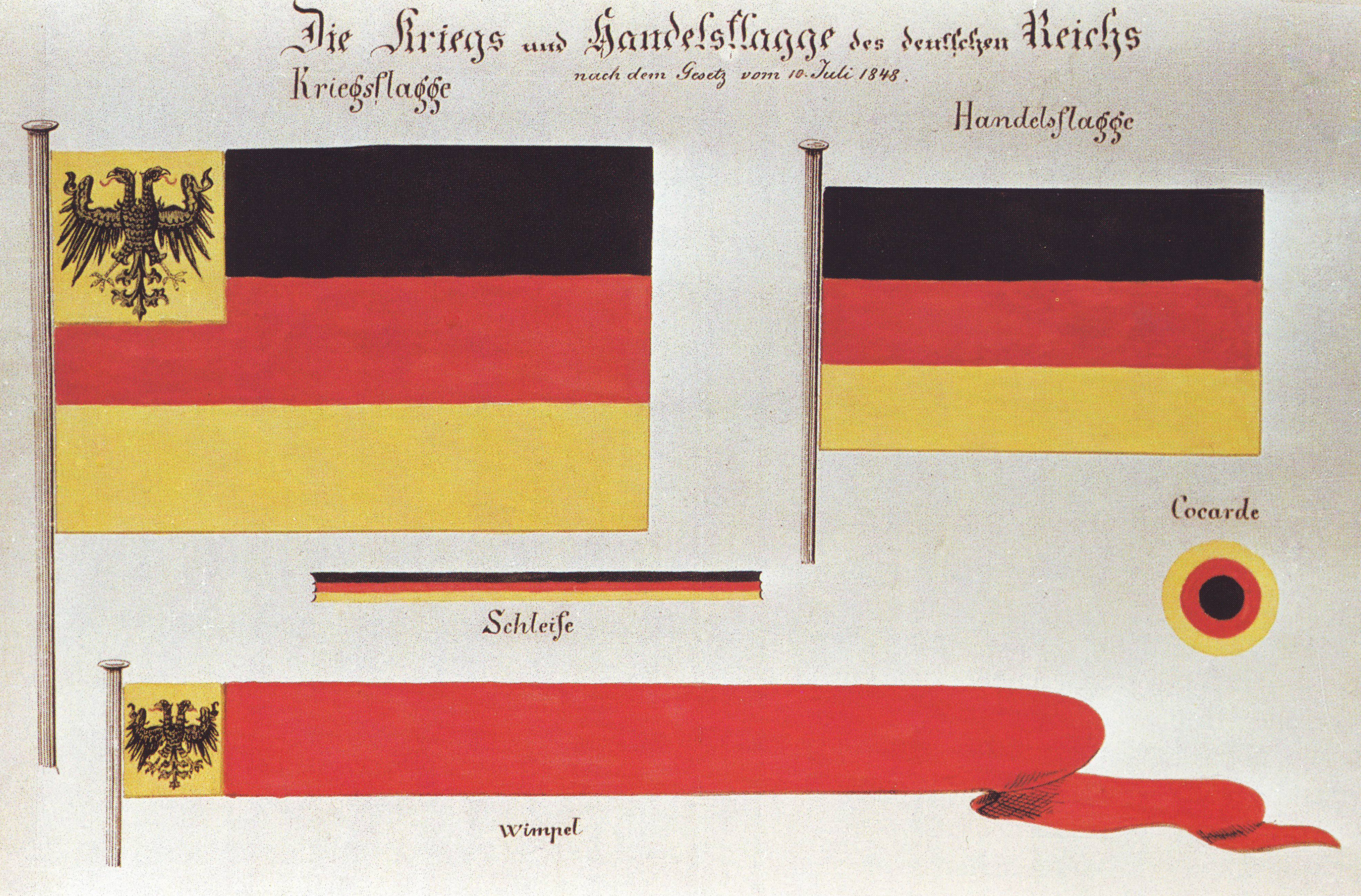
Draft for the war and civil ensign from 1848

The Imperial law regarding the introduction of a war and civil ensign (German: Reichsgesetz betreffend die Einführung einer deutschen Kriegs- und Handelsflagge) was an imperial law of the revolutionary German Empire of 1848. It describes the colours black-red-gold and the usage of a general German imperial flag and a war ensign for the Imperial Fleet.

== History ==
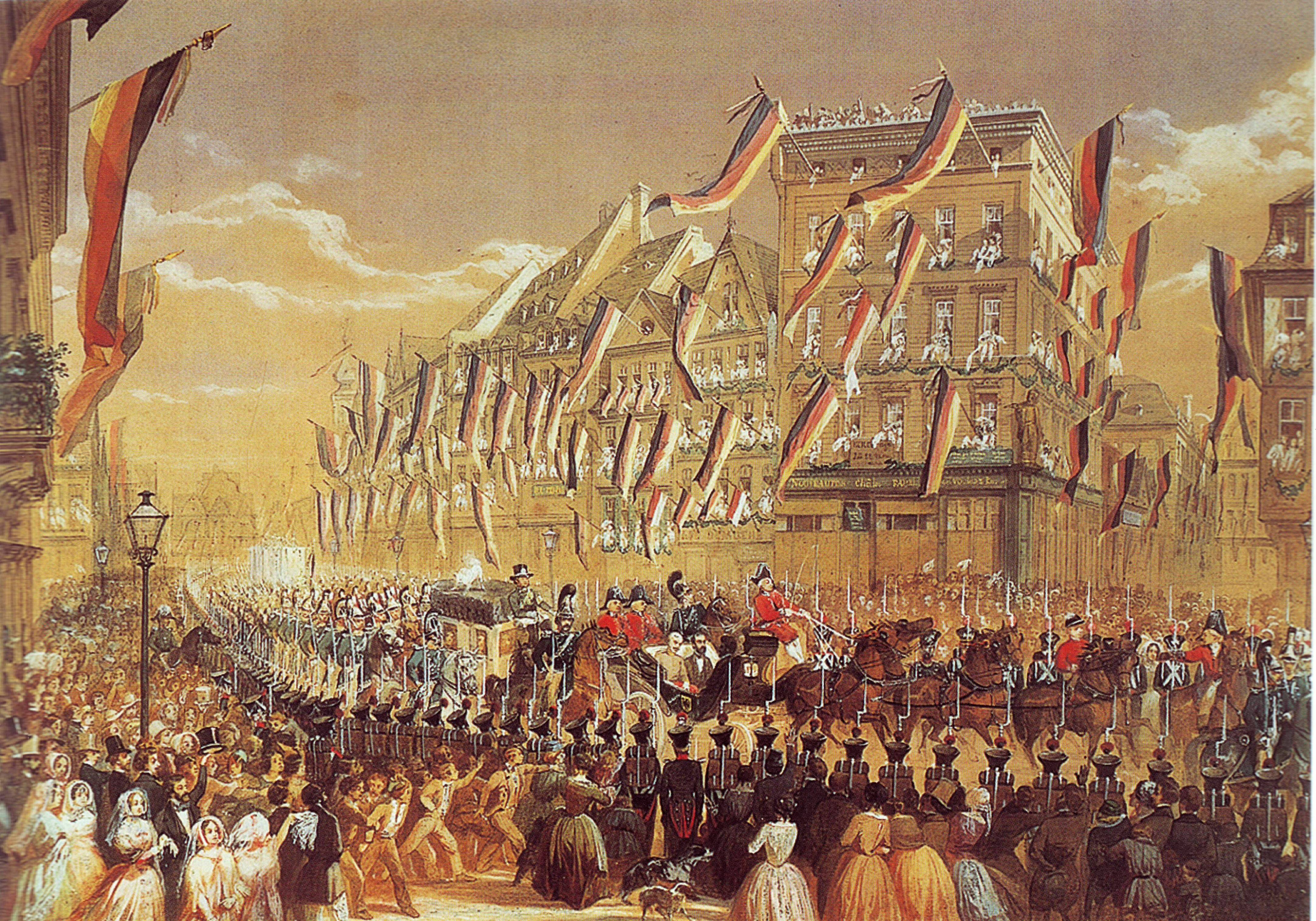
Sea of flags at the arrive of the Imperial Regent in Frankfurt, July 1848

During the German Revolution of 1848 the colours black-red-gold found general acceptance. The Bundestag adopted them, and even Prussian King Frederick William IV wore such an armband on 22 March, when he promised that Prussia will become a part of Germany.

On 31 July the National Assembly in Frankfurt decided on a law, but only on 12 November did the Imperial Regent sign it. Regent Archduke John of Austria had postponed the law because the great powers had not recognized the Empire. Great Britain threatened to consider the German flag as a pirate flag. Still, constitutional historian Ernst Rudolf Huber explains, the flag law was absolutely valid legally. Because of the general popularity of the colours the imperial constitution of March 1849 lacked a paragraph on the flag.

== Content ==
According to the imperial law (article 4) German commercial ships had to travel under the 'national flag'; but they were allowed to use additionally the flag of their state or city. The law distinguished between the national flag, also called 'general German imperial flag', and the war ensign: the latter contained the imperial coat of arms in the upper quarter. While articles 1 and 3 describe the third colour as yellow, article 2 describes a 'golden (yellow) ground.'

== Ships sailing under black-red-gold ==
German war ensign

The Central Power (German government) was still not universally recognized; that is the reason for the permission to sail also under a state flag. In May 1849 an incident occurred, when a British ship entered the harbour of Kiel but did not salute the German flag. With a warning shot one reminded the ship of this duty under international law. Negotiations led to a formal apology from London.

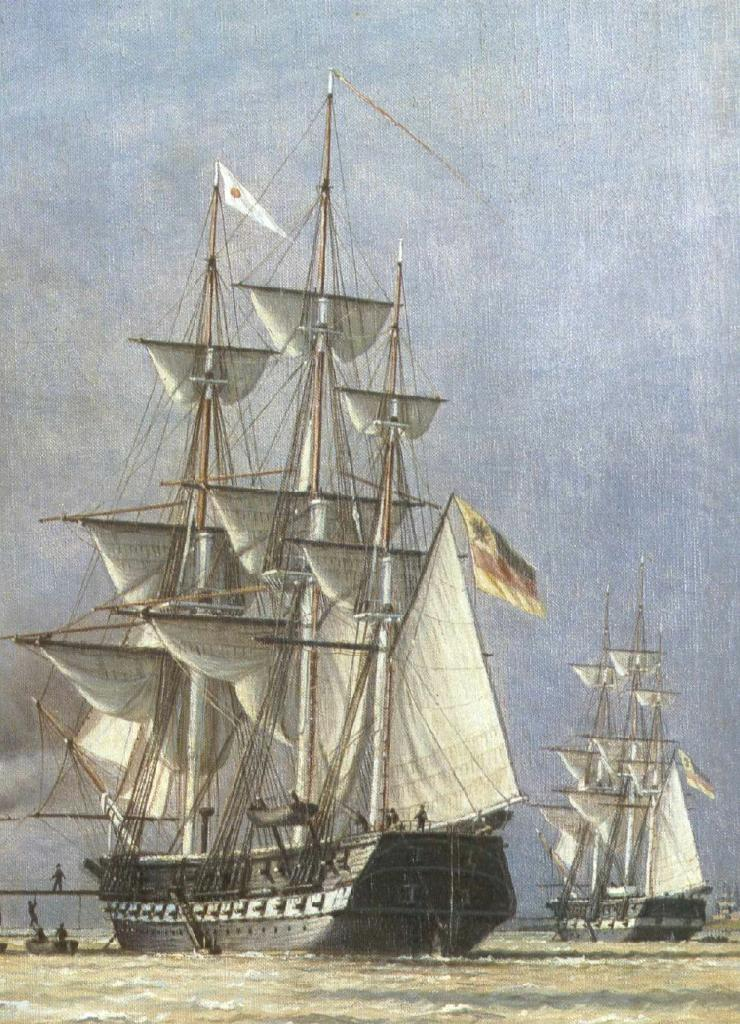
The fregates Eckernförde and Deutschland, 1849, with the war ensig

On 4 June 1849, at the Sea Battle of Heligoland, the commander of the then British island led the German ships be shot at for a warning. After a complaint the British Foreign Office threatened to regard ships as privateers if they fight without official authority.

The German Bundestag, introducing the colours on 9 March 1848, but also the Central Power had forgotten to announce the new flag to foreign countries (with exception to the USA). After 21 June 1849 it struggled to receive this recognition. When the Central Power ended its activities in December 1849, the Bundeszentralkommission took over. In May 1850 the US, the Netherlands (as a member of the German Confederation), Belgien, Sardinia, Turkey, Portugal, Naples, Spain, Greece and conditionally France had accepted the flag. Great Britain was asked but answered on 29 July procrastinatorily.

== Sources ==
- Ernst Rudolf Huber: Dokumente zur deutschen Verfassungsgeschichte. Volume 1: Deutsche Verfassungsdokumente 1803–1850, 3rd edition, Kohlhammer, Stuttgart et al., 1978, S. 401, no. 109: Reichsgesetz betreffend die Einführung einer deutschen Kriegs- und Handelsflagge vom 12. November 1848 (Reichsgesetzblatt 1848, pp. 15/16.)
