= Urburschenschaft =

Student fraternity in Jena, Germany

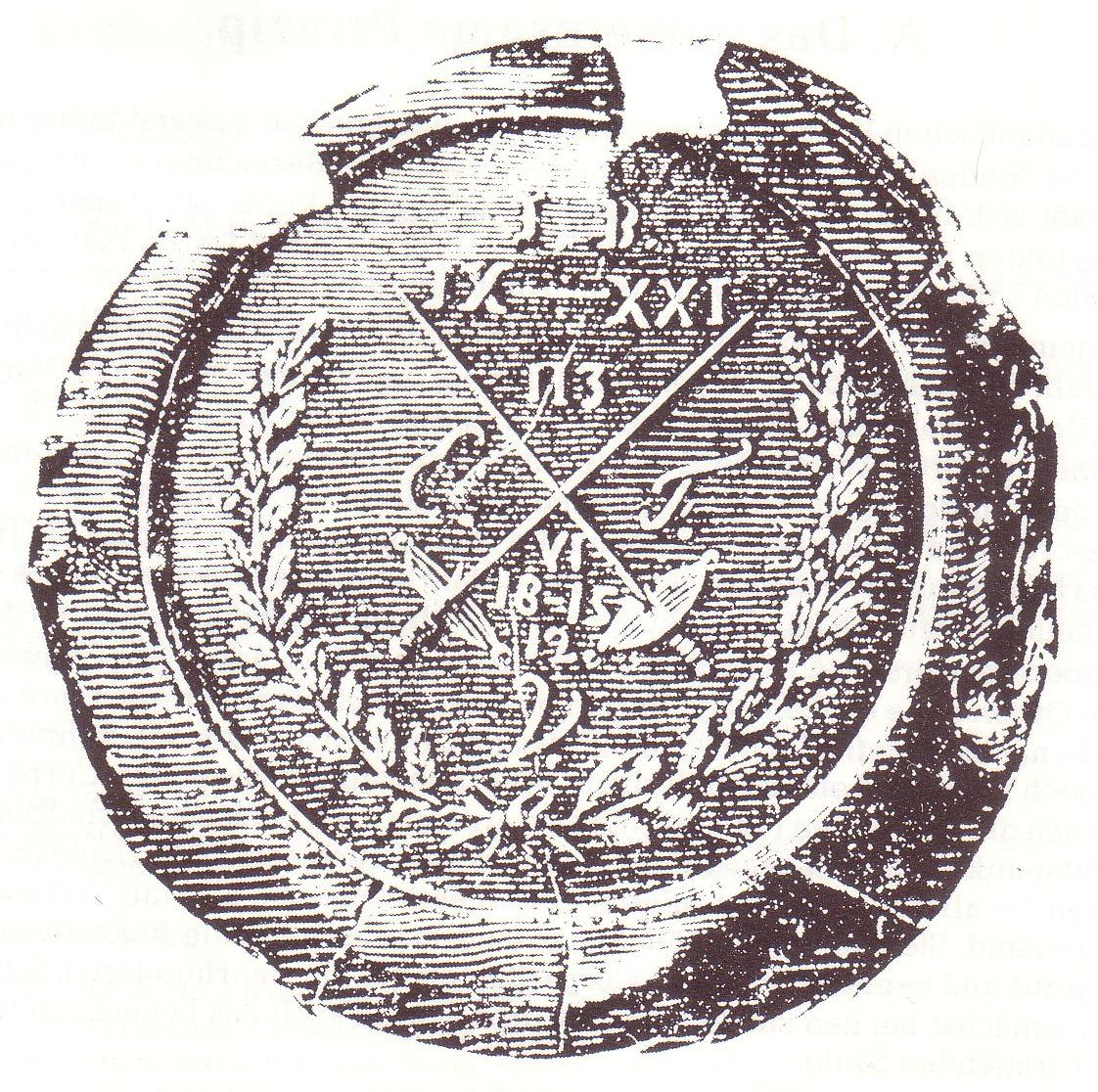
- 1815 Seal
- Founded: 1815; 210 years ago University of Jena
- Type: Studentenverbindung
- Affiliation: Independent
- Status: Defunct
- Emphasis: Burschenschaft
- Scope: Local
- Motto: Ehre, Freiheit, Vaterland "Honor, Freedom, Fatherland"
- Colors: Black, Red and Gold
- Flag
- Chapters: 3
- Members: 859 lifetime
- Headquarters: Jena, Thuringia; Germany

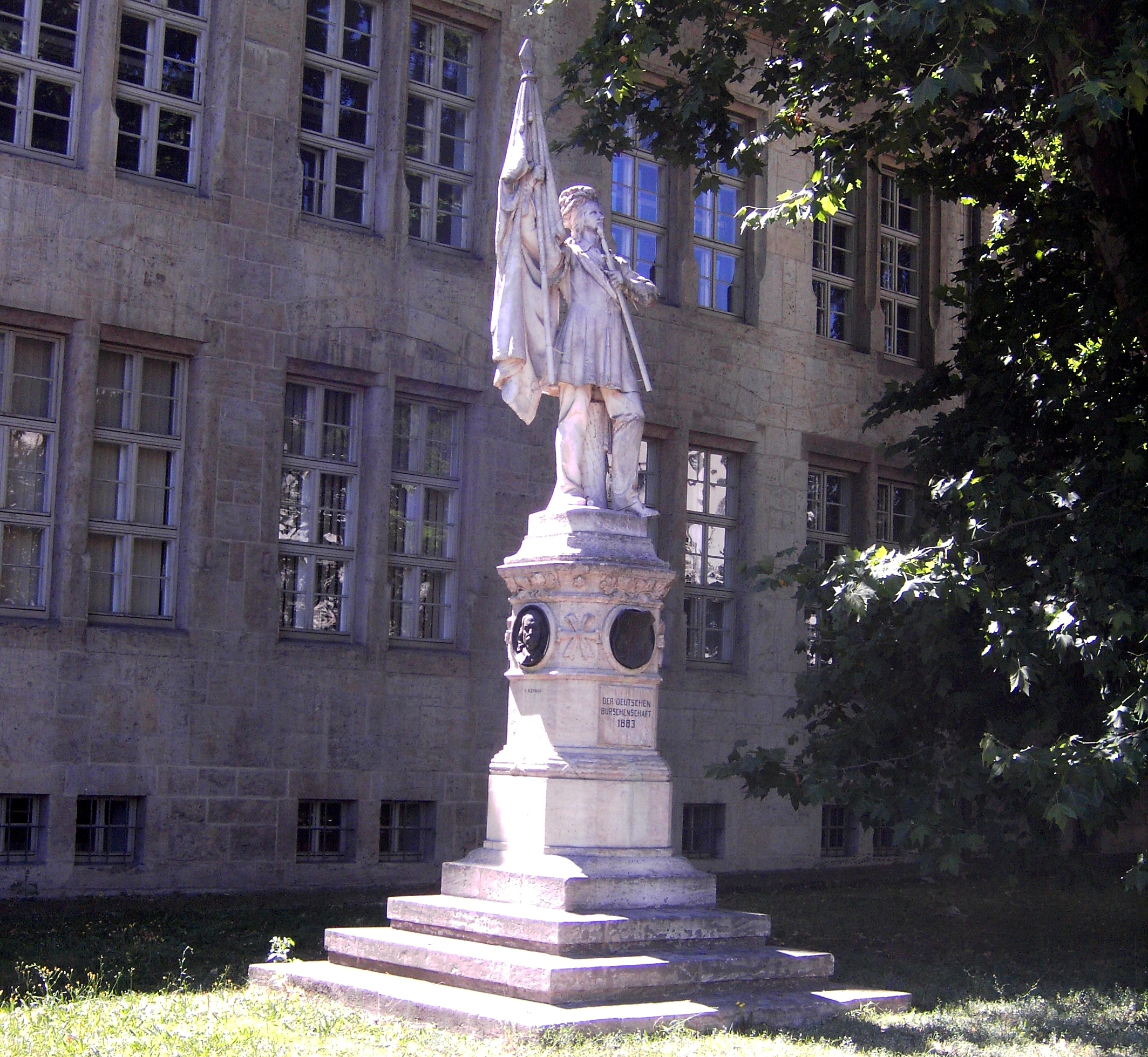
Urburschenschaft Monument at the Friedrich Schiller University Jena

The Urburschenschaft (German: [ˈʔuːɐ̯ˌbʊʁʃn̩ʃaft]) was the first Burschenschaft, a form of the German student fraternity known as Studentenverbindung. It was founded in 1815 at the University of Jena and lasted through 1819.

== History ==
Urburschenschaft was founded in 1815 at the University of Jena in Jena, Thuringia, in Germany. It formed when the university's existing Seniors' Convention of Landsmannschaft dissolved the convention and reformed as the first Burschenschaft.

Its founders wanted to abolish regional student groups and organize all students (Burschen) into a unified Burschenschaft. The group supported liberal and nationalistic ideas such as abolishing Germany's small states and creating a united Germany. This was a concept promoted by Jakob Friedrich Fries, a lecturer at the University of Jena at the time.

Urburschenschaft had 859 active student members, about sixty percent of all the students at the University of Jena from the summer of 1815 to the winter semester of 1819–1820. At other German universities, Burschenschaften were founded in the early 19th century as associations of university students were inspired by the ideals of the liberal and nationalistic ideas of Urburschenschaft. Its motto was Ehre, Freiheit, Vaterland or “Honor, Freedom, Fatherland”.

Despite its success at Jena, the group was unsuccessful in achieving its goal of establishing a single student fraternity for all universities. In 1819, Urburschenschaft split into three fraternities: Arminia Jena, Germania Jena, and Teutonia Jena. In addition, the Jena Landsmannschaft reformed in 1820, including Corps Franconia-Jena zu Regensburg, Corps Saxonia Jena, and Corps Thuringia Jena.

== Symbols ==
The fraternity's motto is Ehre, Freiheit, Vaterland or "Honor, Freedom, Fatherland".

Originally, Urburschenschaft's couleurs were from the state flag by the elder Reuss noble line in 1778, because the group used that flag.

Having no known connections to that event, Urburschenschaft changed its couleurs to Black-Red-Gold. Many founding members of the Jena Burschenschaft had been fighting in the Lützow Free Corps during the Wars of Liberation; uniforms of the Royal Prussian Free Corps von Lützow were black, with red trim, and golden-colored brass buttons. Its flag was Red-Black-Red with a gold oak leaf in its center and gold fringe on its edges.

When Urburschenschaft became defunct in 1819, Daniel August von Binzer wrote the song "We had built a stately house". A verse from the song is, "The ribbon was cut, it was black, red and gold, and God suffered it, who knows what he wanted!" This cemented the association of these colors with the fraternity and the German democracy movement. Later, the Urburschenschaft flag's colors were the basis of the national colours of Germany.

== Notable members ==
One of its first members was Heinrich von Gagern, the president of the Frankfurt Parliament from 1848 to 1849.
