= Adolf Soetbeer =

German economist

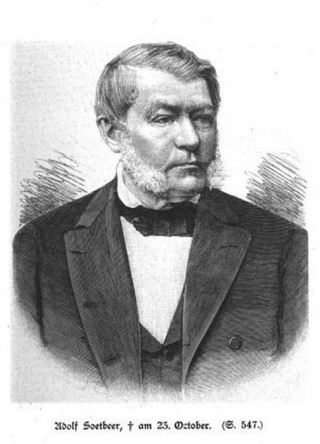
Adolf Soetbeer 001.JPG

Adolf Soetbeer (23 November 1814 – 22 October 1892) was a German economist, born at Hamburg. In 1840 he became librarian and in 1843 Secretary of the Hamburg Chamber of Commerce, where he laid the foundation of the excellent system of commercial statistics for which Hamburg became noted. He published Denkschrift über Hamburgs Münzverhältnisse (1846) and subsequently numerous monographs and pamphlets, defending the cause of gold monometallism. Until his death he ranked as the leading defender of the single gold standard, the adoption of which by Germany was brought about largely through his efforts. Among his most important works are:

- Denkschrift betreffend die Einführung der Goldwährung in Deutschland (1854)
- Zur Frage der deutschen Münzeinheit (1861)
- Beiträge zur Geschichte des Geld- and Münz- wesens in Deutschland (1862)
- Edelmettalproduction und Wertverhältnis zwischen Gold und Silber seit der Entdeckung Amerikas bis zur Gegenwart (1879)
- Materialien zur Erläuterung und Beurteilung der wirtschaftlichen Edelmettallverhältnisse und der Währungsfrage (1885).
