= Hanseatic flags =

Banners of Hanseatic cities

13th-century Hanseatic flag of Lübeck.

Hanseatic flags are the banners of Hanseatic cities that were flown by cogs and other ships of the Hanseatic League from 13th to 17th centuries.

== History ==
Originally, Hanseatic ships displayed red gonfalones on their masts, which had a cross at its peak to denote the protection of the sovereign. Red was also the colour used by Danish and English shipping, the English later adopting the St George's Cross. From the second half of the 13th century, the individual Hanseatic cities created various banners to distinguish themselves from other member cities. The red gonfalone remained in use in addition to these flags. The oldest Hanseatic flag is the plain red banner used by Hamburg. Hanseatic flags were mostly red-white and some featured symbols, such as crosses.

Many cities that were members of the Hanseatic league continue to use red and white as their city colours today.

== Hanseatic pennant ==
In addition to these banners, ships also flew a Hanseatic pennant (Hanseatenwimpel) where the upper half is white (silver) and the lower half is red.

Hanseatic pennant (1:16)

== Banners ==
=== 13th century ===
Hamburg

Riga

Lübeck

=== 14th century ===
Bremen

Danzig (Gdańsk)

Elbing (Elbląg)

Rostock

Stralsund

=== 15th century ===
Königsberg (Kaliningrad)

Wismar

Stettin (Szczecin)

=== Other seals and coins ===
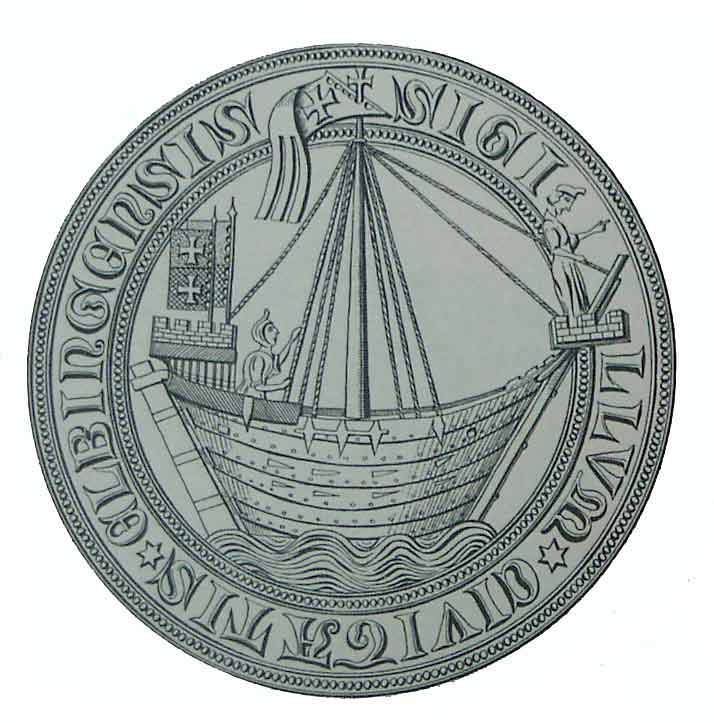
1350 seal of Elbląg (Elbing), depicting the ship flying city banner

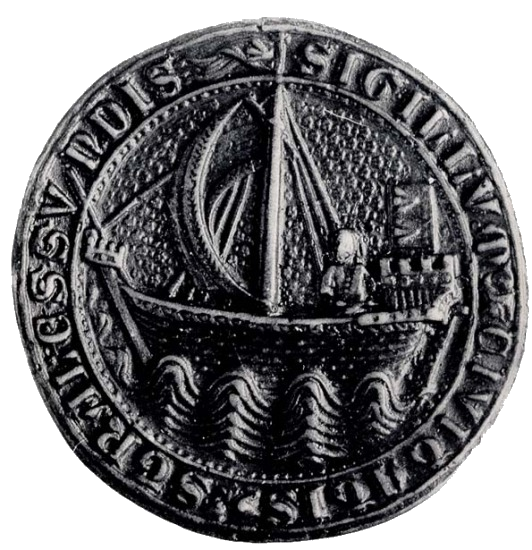
Seal of Stralsund (1329)

== Flags of Hanseatic cities today ==
Arnheim (Arnhem)

Arnsberg

Beckum

Berlin

Bielefeld

Bocholt

Bochum

Borgentreich

Braunschweig

Breckerfeld

Bremen

Köln (Cologne)

Deventer

Dinslaken

Doesburg

Dortmund

Duisburg

Elbląg

Emmerich am Rhein

Erfurt

Frankfurt an der Oder

Gdańsk

Geldern

Geseke

Goslar

Göttingen

Greifswald

Groningen

Hagen

Halle (Saale)

Hamburg

Hamm

Hannover (Hanover)

Haselünne

Hattem

Hattingen

Herford

Hildesheim

Kamen

Kampen

Kiel

Memel (Klaipėda)

Kolberg (Kołobrzeg)

Königsberg (Kaliningrad)

Köslin (Koszalin)

Kraków

Lübeck

Magdeburg

Minden

Münster

Neuss

Nijmegen

Oldenzaal

Ommen

Osnabrück

Paderborn

Pernau (Pärnu)

Ratingen

Riga

Roermond

Rostock

Stolp (Słupsk)

Soest

Solingen

Stockholm

Stralsund

Stettin (Szczecin)

Reval (Tallinn)

Dorpat (Tartu)

Toruń

Unna

Fellin (Viljandi)

Vreden

Warburg

Warendorf

Werne

Wesel

Winterberg

Wipperfürth

Wismar

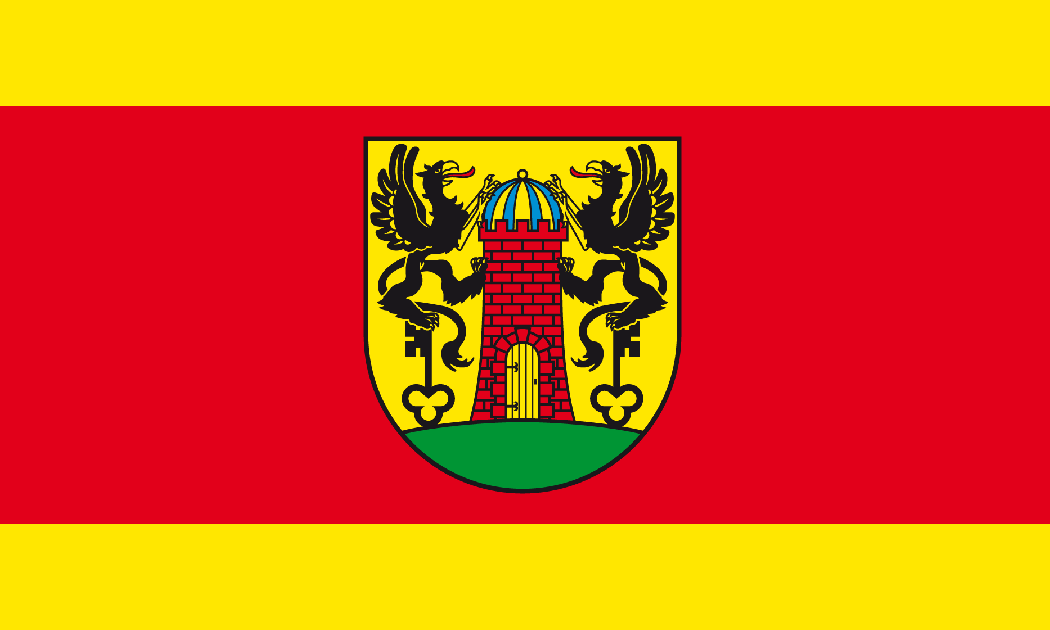
Wolgast

Breslau (Wrocław)

Zutphen

Zwolle
