= Carlo Mierendorff =

German politician (1897–1943)

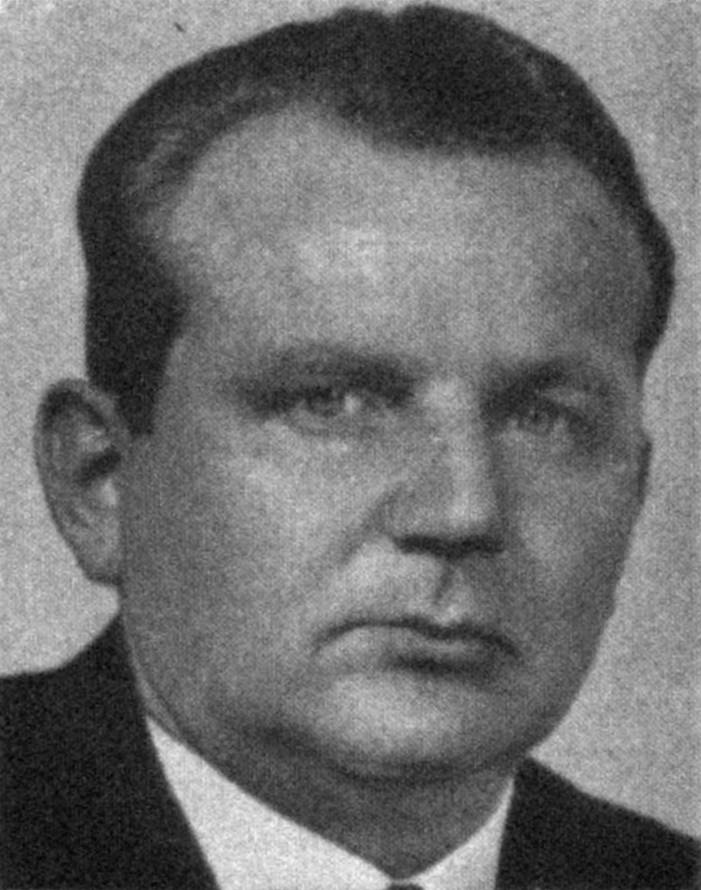
- Mierendorff c. 1932

Member of the Reichstag
- In office 13 October 1930 – 22 June 1933

Personal details
- Born: 24 March 1897 Großenhain, Kingdom of Saxony, German Empire
- Died: 4 December 1943 (aged 46) Leipzig, Nazi Germany
- Party: SPD

Carlo Mierendorff (24 March 1897 – 4 December 1943) was a German politician of the Social Democratic Party (SPD) during the Weimar Republic. An intellectual activist and regional politician in the People's State of Hesse, he played a major role in the propaganda of the SPD and the anti-fascist Iron Front during the last years of the republic. He was elected to the Reichstag in 1930. After the Nazi rise to power, he was arrested and spent several years in concentration camps before being released in 1938. He then helped organise the underground resistance to the Nazi regime until his death in December 1943 in an Allied air raid on Leipzig.

== Early life ==
Mierendorff was born in Großenhain on 24 March 1897 to father Georg, who sold textiles, and mother Charlotte. His family was non-religious but of Lutheran background. He played violin and piano in his childhood and had a good relationship with both of his parents. His father held liberal political views and, after the family moved to Darmstadt, he sent Carlo and his older brother Wilhelm to the humanist Ludwig-Georg-Gymnasium in 1907. There, Carlo acquired an interest in art and literature and became involved in the Wandervogel movement.

== Military service and activism ==
After the outbreak of the First World War, at age 17, Mierendorff enlisted and was sent to the eastern front near Łódź. He was awarded the Iron Cross second class for his service, but became ill and was hospitalised in March 1915 with an inner-ear infection which caused him to become deaf in his left ear. He returned to active duty in November 1917 and served on the western front; the next year, he was personally awarded the Iron Cross first class in a ceremony by Kaiser Wilhelm II.

Though patriotic at the outbreak of the war, he soon grew disillusioned. In 1915, he began publishing a magazine with a group of friends, featuring expressionist poetry and essays on art. He became one of its leading authors even while at the front, writing a number of short stories and two novels. The events of 1918 radicalised Mierendorff. He later recalled that, while serving on the western front in October, his unit closely followed news from Russia: "The common refrain of our evenings was that 'we want to be good Bolsheviks.'" In the magazine's final issue in November, he called for readers to take the initiative in the unfolding revolution.

He returned to Darmstadt that month and co-founded a new publication, a socialist journal, in which he appealed to intellectuals and youth to demand radical change. He attacked the Social Democrats for their alliance with the military and opposition to the radical left, and after the revolution frequently criticised Germany's new institutions and government. The journal drew some attention locally, mostly from both left- and right-wing opponents, but ceased publication due to bankruptcy in mid-1920. Mierendorff began studying political science in Heidelberg in 1919 and, after brief moves to Munich and Freiburg, completed his dissertation on "the economic policy of the German Communist Party" in 1923.

== SPD ==
Considering himself an intellectual activist more than a socialist, he soon began to fear that counterrevolution would bring down the new republic, which he viewed as the best hope for a just society. After right-wing and völkisch students began disrupting lectures by liberals such as Max Weber and Albert Einstein, Mierendorff joined the SPD in January 1921. He led the party's student organisation in Heidelberg and spent much time criticising antisemitism and reaction.

After the assassination of foreign minister Walther Rathenau in 1922, the government ordered all state institutions to close temporarily and fly the republican flag in his honour. Philipp Lenard, an antisemitic and nationalist professor at Heidelberg, refused to close his institute and demanded that students attend his classes. Mierendorff requested that the university take action, and after being ignored, organised a demonstration of 500 students to confront Lenard. When he again refused to follow the order, Mierendorff convinced a police officer to take him into "protective custody", and the students closed the institute and raised the flag themselves. Mierendorff was subsequently charged with breaking and entering, disturbing the peace, and fomenting a riot. He was sentenced to four months imprisonment in April 1923, but served no time due to an amnesty. He also avoided efforts by the university to deny him his degree over the incident. The case gained national prominence and was on one occasion discussed in the Reichstag.

After completing his dissertation, Mierendorff moved to Berlin and began work as a research assistant with the Transport Workers Union. In 1925 he applied for an editorial post at Vorwärts, the SPD's party newspaper, but was rejected. He was instead appointed as deputy chief editor of the minor Hessischer Volksfreund in Darmstadt. Uninterested in Marxist theory and believing the older generation of party leaders to be out of touch, he was frequently critical of their positions. In 1926 he joined the staff of Paul Hertz, secretary of the SPD Reichstag group, in hopes of influencing the party's politics directly. He wrote in the SPD's yearbook, parliamentary newsletter, and other publications.

Mierendorff excelled during the 1928 election campaign and afterwards became one of the party's leading experts on agitation and propaganda. The executive considered placing him on the staff of Otto Braun or Carl Severing in the Prussian government, but Mierendorff had no desire to work under these veterans. He instead became press chief for his friend Wilhelm Leuschner, interior minister of Hesse, a position he held until the end of the republic. Back in Darmstadt once again, Mierendorff voiced his unorthodox perspectives in a number of party journals.

He was particularly concerned about reactionary influence in the republic's institutions. He believed that most active voters had accepted the republican form of government, but monarchist spirit manifested in disputes over policy, such as the use of the imperial flag and the expropriation of the princes. He was especially worried about the Reichswehr's enduring independence from civilian control and frequently agitated against it.

Mierendorff was also critical of proportional representation in the electoral system, which he blamed for Germany's fragmented political landscape and unstable coalition governments. In his view, the use of party lists disconnected from candidates from voters, leading to disillusionment and decline in turnout. He believed that parties filled parliaments with specialists and veterans who failed to adequately represent the citizenry and prevented generational change in politics. Considering these issues a potentially lethal threat to the parliamentary system, he called for the establishment of a majoritarian electoral system, which he believed would force parties to coalesce into broad alliances and connect more closely with voters, to whom they would be more accountable. This was in sharp contrast to the SPD's traditional view on the electoral system – the majority system used during the Imperial era was heavily biased in favour of the nobility and capitalists, and for decades had prevented the SPD from achieving fair representation. Most of the party saw proportional representation as one of the key democratic advances of the republic.

Mierendorff recognised the threat of Nazism earlier than most Social Democrats. Keeping a close eye on the far-right throughout the late 1920s, he believed that fascism in Germany had the potential to pose an acute threat to the republic. In the summer of 1930, he noted the Nazi Party's rise in local elections across the country during 1928–29. He attributed this to its strong organisation and enthusiastic membership, and its usage of economic anxiety and racial hatred to appeal to the middle classes and peasants. He also noted their success in recruiting youth, who were attracted by the party's culture of action and simple slogans. At this time, he believed that the Nazis could win up to sixty seats in the Reichstag in the next election, drawing support mostly from the bourgeois parties whose voters would be swayed by its emotional rhetoric and opposition to Marxism. He urged mobilisation and action against this threat, but the leadership of SPD were preoccupied with the crisis of the Brüning government. The Nazis ultimately won 107 seats in the September election.

Mierendorff's criticism of the SPD intensified in the aftermath and he urged the party to change its strategy. He believed they had fumbled the election campaign by primarily targeting Brüning rather than the Nazis and Communists, neglected the appeals to emotion which the Nazis used so effectively, and abandoned extraparliamentary politics to the two anti-republican parties. He dedicated his time during the remainder of the republic's lifespan to analysing fascism and developing proposals to fight it. By 1931 he believed that Nazi success grew from many sources of social discontent, not only the economic crisis as was party orthodoxy, although he discounted antisemitism as a major factor. In his view, the SPD needed to present an alternative, positive vision to attract voters. Their program must appeal to all sectors of society from which Nazism drew its strength to effectively counter it. He proposed that SPD propaganda focus on internationalism and reconciliation to counter Nazi nationalism and chauvinism, economic recovery to win over the disaffected, and reform of the electoral and federal system to bolster democratic legitimacy.

In September 1931, Mierendorff and Leuschner uncovered the Boxheim Papers, a collection of internal Nazi documents which detailed their plan to deal with a left-wing uprising, involving martial law, executions, and cutting off supplies to worker-occupied cities if necessary. The papers were publicised in November and made headlines, but no charges were brought over the issue as bourgeois leaders, who viewed the Nazis as potential allies, declined to pursue the case.

== Iron Front ==
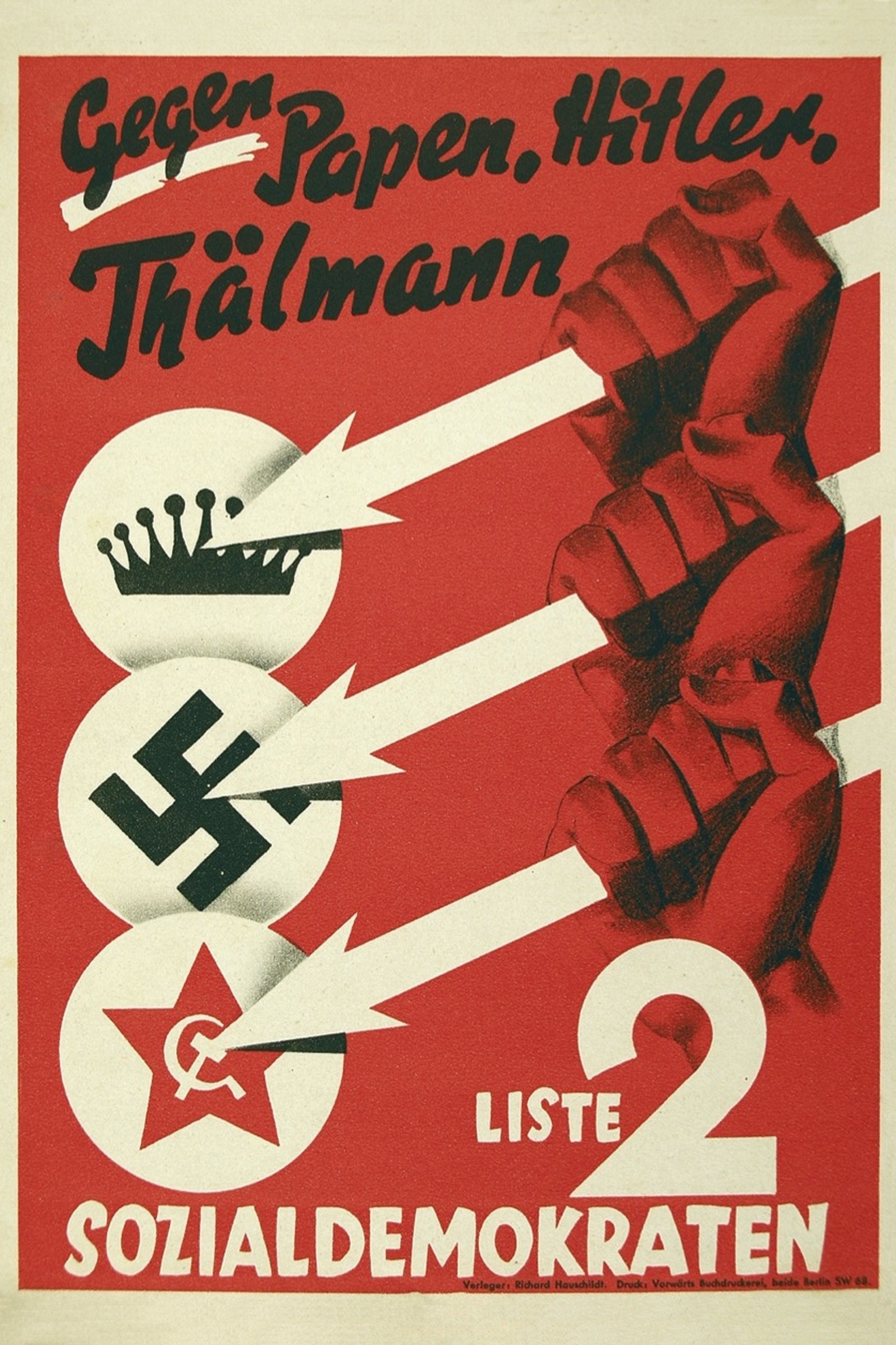
A widely publicised election poster depicting the Three Arrows striking the forces of monarchism (Papen), fascism (Hitler), and communism (Thälmann).

The papers nonetheless contributed to the founding of the Iron Front later that year. Mierendorff recruited exiled Russian social democrat Sergei Chakhotin to develop the organisation's image and propaganda, hoping to appeal to those who were not swayed by traditional means such as the press and public meetings. They created the Three Arrows representing "unity, activity, and discipline", although they were most famously used in an SPD poster for the November 1932 election to depict the struggle against monarchism, fascism, and communism; they later became an iconic symbol of social democracy across Europe. Mierendorff and Chakhotin also promoted the greeting "freedom" (German: Freiheit) with a raised fist among members of the Iron Front.

Mierendorff hoped that a more activist, propaganda-focused strategy would reinvigorate the SPD and unite its divided left and right wings in pursuit of action against Nazism on the ground. In February 1932, the Reichsbanner agreed to appoint Chakhotin to the head of Iron Front's propaganda department, and his proposals began to be deployed throughout the country. They were popular among the rank and file, but struggled to find acceptance among the leadership, and were implemented sluggishly. When Mierendorff and Chakhotin approached the SPD executive with their proposals ahead of the Prussian state election in April, they were faced with concerns about public image and the potential for trouble with the police. Though the executive agreed after some delay, the plan was adopted chaotically late in the campaign, and the SPD lost the election badly.

Mierendorff and Chakhotin were given free rein to fully implement their proposals in the Hessian state election on 19 June. Over the course of four weeks, the Iron Front campaigned vigorously. Activists distributed 50,000 buttons bearing the three arrows, posted flags and banners in public spaces, and greeted neighbours with the antifascist salute. Campaign rallies used young speakers to appeal to the youth, and the Iron Front orchestrated marches and rallies at the crescendo of the campaign to demonstrate their unity and readiness. They organised a total of ten major events during the campaign compared to the Nazis' four; in the final week of the campaign, the SPD held three parades in the capital Darmstadt while the Nazis held none.

Mierendorff and Chakhotin believed their efforts were successful and were greatly enthused by the results of the election. Compared to the previous six months earlier, the SPD won 4,100 more votes, bucking the declining national trend. The Nazis also fell by 600 votes in Darmstadt itself. Mierendorff admitted that their success was limited to certain areas – the Nazis improved their overall performance from 37% to 44% – but was pleased with the outcome. Despite a substantial decline in turnout, he believed that they had been successful in mobilising non-voters. Their model was widely deployed during the July federal election. Though the SPD still suffered a decline, the Iron Front was energised by its new image, and its Nazi and Communist opponents took note.

== End of the republic ==
The Prussian coup and the Nazis' success greatly disheartened Mierendorff, however. Afterwards, he wrote: "The Weimar constitution essentially exists only on paper. In such an historical moment the party has one essential task: to recognize reality." Building on his previous criticisms, he stated that the SPD had failed by refusing to challenge nationalist foreign policy, push constitutional reform, or put forward an alternative economic vision. By tying themselves to the establishment, they became easy targets for the Nazis' propaganda. Though he welcomed the adoption of a program advocating "socialist restructuring of the economy" after the July election, he believed that the party's noncommital approach to extraparliamentary action or new forms of propaganda rendered it ineffective.

Mierendorff's faith in the SPD leadership deteriorated as they refused to consider extraparliamentary action in the midst of the deepening crisis: "There is no one interested in our agitation, and the work to reform the party from within — oh God, that, too, looks anything but encouraging." He helped organised mass protests in Frankfurt and Darmstadt in response to the appointment of Hitler as Chancellor in January 1933, but struggled to counter the pessimism which gripped the social democratic movement. He held out hope that the constitution would not be immediately dismantled, and that the Nazi government would fail to fulfill its economic promises, giving new strength to the forces who opposed them. However, in short order, the Reichstag Fire Decree brought the wrath of the state upon the SPD and destroyed their ability to fight. Mierendorff himself became a fugitive wanted for "corruption". Shortly after the March 1933 election, he escaped over the border to Zurich.

== Arrest, resistance, and death ==
He did not go into exile in Switzerland, however. Believing that he was dutybound to fight, Mierendorff returned to Germany after two weeks. He attended the Reichstag on 23 March and voted against the Enabling Act. He evaded arrest for almost three months before being taken in on 13 June. On 21 June, he was brought to Osthofen concentration camp, where he was beaten and abused in the first night and had to spend several weeks in sickbay. He was also psychologically mistreated: for days, Mierendorff had to straighten nails that other prisoners had to bend. After being transferred to various other concentration camps, he was released in 1938. Afterwards, despite surveillance by Nazi authorities, he made contact with numerous underground opposition groups and wrote for the resistance under the pseudonym "Willemer". In 1941, he joined the Kreisau Circle. In the shadow cabinet of Ludwig Beck, Mierendorff was proposed as a senior member of the propaganda department.

Mierendorff was killed in an Allied air raid on Leipzig on 4 December 1943. He was buried in the Darmstadt forest cemetery.

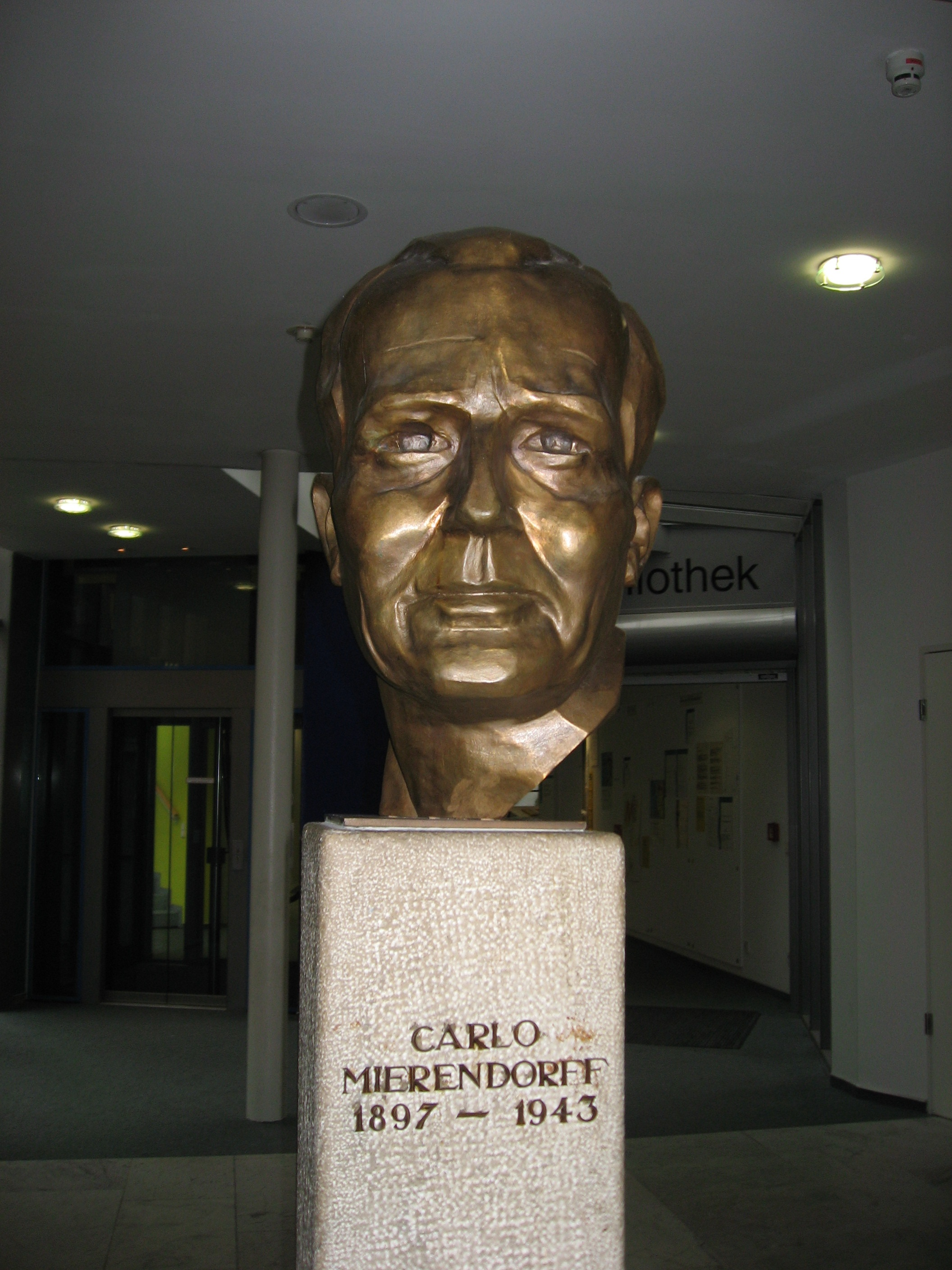
Bust of Mierendorff in the Justus-Liebig-Haus in Darmstadt

Mierendorffplatz in Charlottenburg, Berlin, is named in his honour, as are numerous streets in towns and cities across Hesse.
