= Nikolay Ustryalov =

Nikolay Ustryalov may refer to:

- Nikolay Gerasimovich Ustryalov (1805–1870), Russian historian
- Nikolay Vasilyevich Ustryalov (1890–1937), his grand nephew, pioneer of Russian National Bolshevism
