= YPSL =

YPSL may refer to:

- Young People's Socialist League (1907), the youth wing of the Socialist Party of America;
- Young People's Socialist League (Socialist Party USA), the youth wing of Socialist Party USA.
