= Alexander Pomorsky =

Russian poet

Alexander Nikolaevich Pomorsky (17 August 1891 – 1977) was a Russian poet. He was active in Russian Revolution and Proletkult.

He published his first poems in 1908. In that same year he joined the Bolshevik faction of the Russian Social Democratic Labor Party.

In August 1915 he intervened in a public debate in Kharkov at which supporters of the Russian Empire's participation in the First World War were discussing the issue of "the importance of the military industrial committees and the participation of workers in the country's defense," Pomorsky spoke against the war and received not only a warm response from the audience but also a two year prison sentence.

In 1917, he published his first book of poems Песни борьбы (Songs of the Struggle) followed by Цветы восстания (Flowers of the Rebellion) in 1918. He wrote for Pravda before moving to Tambov where he settled in Kozlov (renamed Michurinsk in 1934). Here he edited Izvestia, the newspaper of the Kozlov Soviet. In September 1918 he headed the newly formed Tambov Proletkult, a left-wing workers' cultural organisation. He was involved in making sure books were published and that the town had a thriving theatrical culture..

Following end of the civil war, Pomorsky went Sukhum where he worked in Political Education for three years then moving to Tiflis to continue his political work. By the 30s he was living in Moscow. In the 1920s and 1930s, he wrote several wrote poems dedicated to the transformations taking place in the Transcaucasus.

The collection Стихи и песни (Poems and Songs) was published in 1936.
