= Nikolai Avdakov =

Russian industrialist and statesman

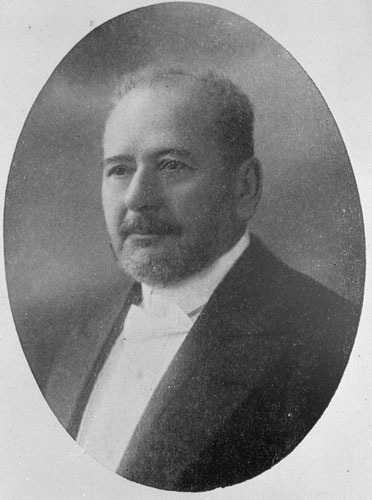
Nikolai Avdakov

Nikolai Stepanovich Avdakov (Russian: Никола́й Степа́нович Авдако́в; 16 (28) February, 1847, Staro-Shchedrinskaya - 11 (24) September, 1915) was an ethnic Armenian engineer, industrialist and capitalist active in Russian Empire. From 1906 he was strongly associated with the Association of Industry and Trade until his death in 1915.

His business interests included playing a founding role of Prodamet, being chairman of Produgol and commercial director of the Société Générale's subsidiary Rutchenko Coal Company. He was a member of the State Council, which was established as the upper legislative chamber in 1906. Shortly before his death in 1915 he was briefly chairman of the Central War Industry Committee.
