= Three Arrows =

Political symbol

Versions
- The version used as the emblem of the Iron Front
- Adopted: 1932
- Use: An official emblem of the Social Democratic Party of Germany and its paramilitary wing the Iron Front; anti-fascist symbol designed to deface the Nazi swastika

The Three Arrows (German: Drei Pfeile) is a political symbol associated with the Social Democratic Party of Germany (SPD), used in the late history of the Weimar Republic. First conceived for the SPD-dominated Iron Front as a symbol of the social democratic resistance against Nazism in 1932, it became an official symbol of the Party during the November 1932 German federal election, representing their opposition towards monarchism, Nazism, and communism.

Since its inception, the symbol has been used in many different contexts by a variety of anti-fascist, social democratic and socialist organisations.

== Weimar Republic ==
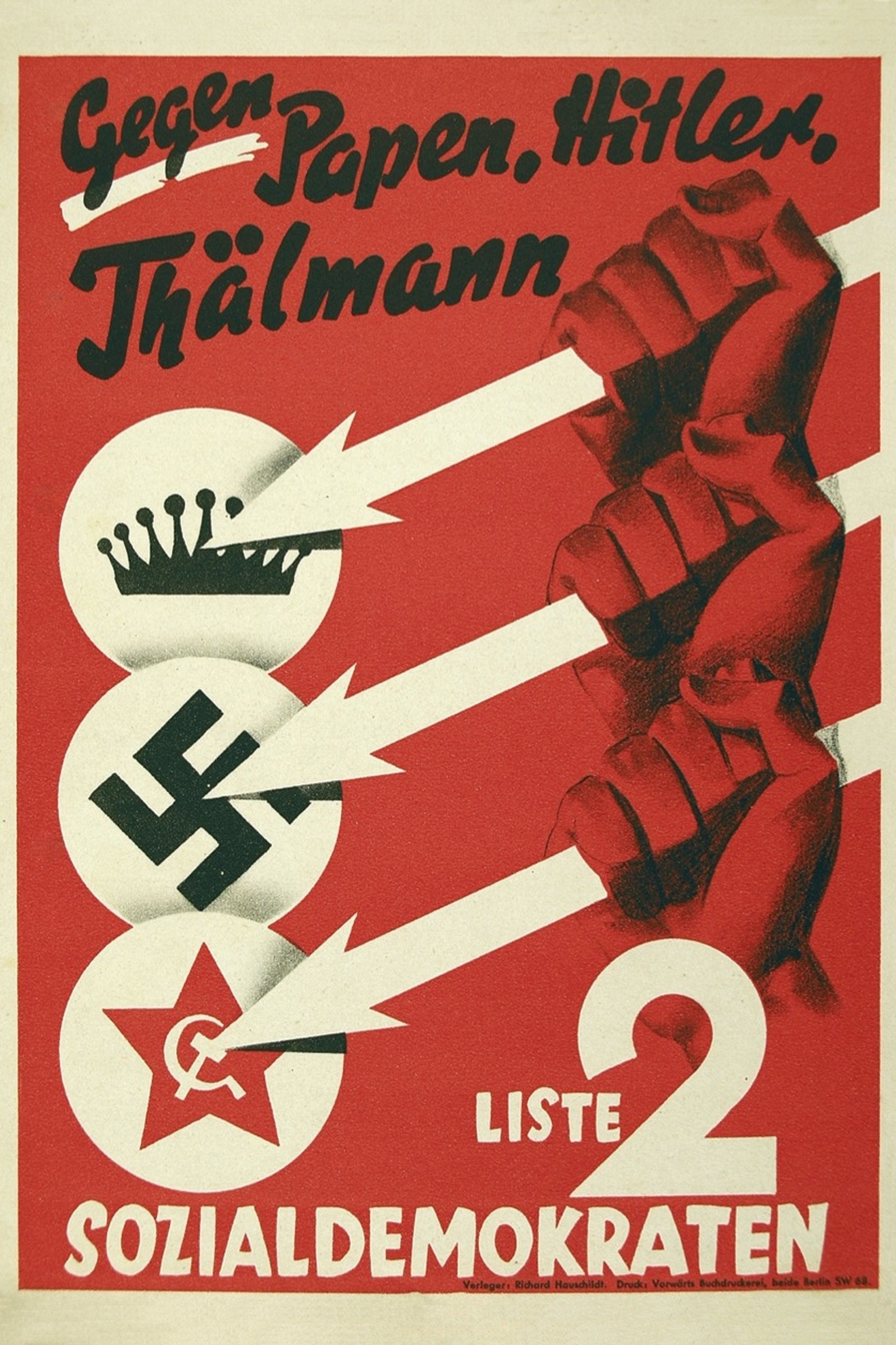
A widely publicized election poster of the Social Democratic Party of Germany from 1932, with the Three Arrows symbol representing resistance against monarchism, Nazism and communism, alongside the slogan "Against Papen, Hitler, Thälmann"

The Social Democratic Party of Germany (SPD) was opposed by both the Nazi Party (NSDAP) and the Communist Party (KPD). In this setting, the SPD organizer Carlo Mierendorff recruited Russian exiled physiologist Sergei Chakhotin as the propagandist of the paramilitary Iron Front, and together they developed propaganda initiatives to counter the NSDAP and the KPD in early 1932. The two launched the Three Arrows as a symbol for the social democrat militancy. The Iron Front was regarded as a "social fascist terror organisation" by the KPD.

Cover of Chakhotin's book Three Arrows against the Swastika

Mierendorf and Chakhotin launched the Three Arrows against the Swastika (Dreipfeil gegen Hakenkreuz) campaign. Chakhotin authored a book by the same name. The Three Arrows were thought to represent the struggle of the social democratic movement against reaction (referring to monarchism), communism and fascism. On a widely used and publicized SPD election poster for the 6 November 1932 Reichstag elections, the Three Arrows were used to represent opposition to the Communist Party, the monarchist parties, and the Nazi Party, accompanied by the slogan "Against Papen, Hitler, Thälmann". The three arrows also represented the three agents of working class strength: political (represented by the SPD), economic (represented by the trade unions) and physical (represented by the Reichsbanner Schwarz-Rot-Gold). Chakhotin provides an even wider range of meanings, including the three elements of the movement (political/intellectual power, economic force, physical force), the three qualities demanded of fighters (activity, discipline, union), as well as the ideals of the French Revolution (liberté, égalité, fraternité). He also noted that "the figure 3 appears so often in human life, in thoughts, in personal life, and in history, that it has become a sort of 'sacred figure'."

The aesthetic of the campaign and the Three Arrows symbol as such drew inspiration from Soviet-Russian avant-garde revolutionary artwork. According to Chakhotin, his inspiration for the Three Arrows was a swastika that had been crossed over with chalk in Heidelberg. Per Chakhotin's argument, the Three Arrows and the swastika would always appear as if the three lines were imposed over the swastika rather than the other way around. The Three Arrows were adopted as an official social democrat symbol by the SPD leadership and the Iron Front by June 1932. Iron Front members would carry the symbol on their arm bands. The slogan "neither Stalin's slaves nor Hitler's henchmen" was also used by the SPD in connection with the symbol.

== Use outside Germany ==
In August 1932, the Austrian Social Democrats adopted the Three Arrows as their combat symbol. The Austrian socialist poet Karl Schneller dedicated the poem Drei Pfeile to the 1932 Austrian Social Democratic Party congress. The symbol was banned in Austria in 1933. During the Nazi regime, the symbol appeared on pamphlets of the Revolutionary Socialists of Austria and was used in graffiti. During 1932–1935, it was also used in Belgium, Denmark and the United Kingdom.

After Chakhotin had been forced into exile to France, the symbol became used by the French Section of the Workers' International. The Three Arrows remained the symbol of the French socialists until the 1970s, when it was substituted with the fist and rose symbol. After World War II, the Three Arrows became the official party logo of the Social Democratic Party of Austria (SPÖ) in 1945. The symbol had been modified to include a circle, and the symbolism changed to represent the unity of industrial workers, farm workers and intellectuals. The Three Arrows remained a prominent symbol of the Social Democratic Party of Austria until the 1950s. According to the modern SPÖ, the Three Arrows represent opposition against fascism, capitalism and clericalism.

The Portuguese Democratic People's Party, created in 1974 in the aftermath of the Carnation Revolution, which put an end to the 48-year-long dictatorship in Portugal, and renamed itself the Social Democratic Party in 1976, uses an adaptation of the Three Arrows as its logo since its foundation. However, its arrows are pointing upwards, and each have a different colour (previously black, red and white; the white having been replaced by orange). According to party members involved in the discussions about the choice of symbols, the Arrows were chosen as a way to differentiate the party from its main rivals' easily recognizable logos: The Socialist Party's raised fist and rose (fist and rose), and the Communist Party's hammer and sickle. It is also supposed to stress the resistance to and rejection of fascism and Nazism.

The Three Arrows were adopted by socialist and antifascist organizations in Poland. In the 1930s the symbol became an emblem of two political parties: Polish Socialist Party (Polska Partia Socjalistyczna) and General Jewish Labour Bund in Poland (Algemejner Jidiszer Arbeter Bund in Pojln).

The Three Arrows symbol is popularly used within the antifa movement in the United States, along with flags based on the symbol of antifa in Germany. Sections of the American Left, including the Young People's Socialist League, have adopted the Three Arrows as a logo.

In October 2024, the Anti-Fascist Internationalist Front (AIF) in Myanmar formed to participate in the ongoing civil war and use the Three Arrows Symbol in their flag.

Logo of the French Section of the Workers' International (SFIO)

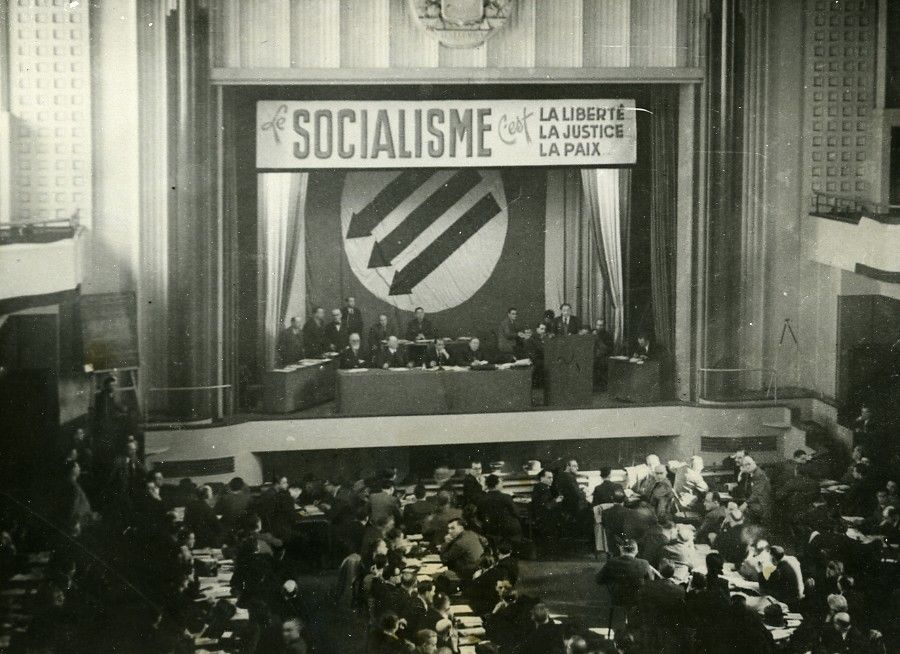
Extraordinary National Congress of the SFIO, March 1946

Logo of the General Jewish Labour Bund in Poland

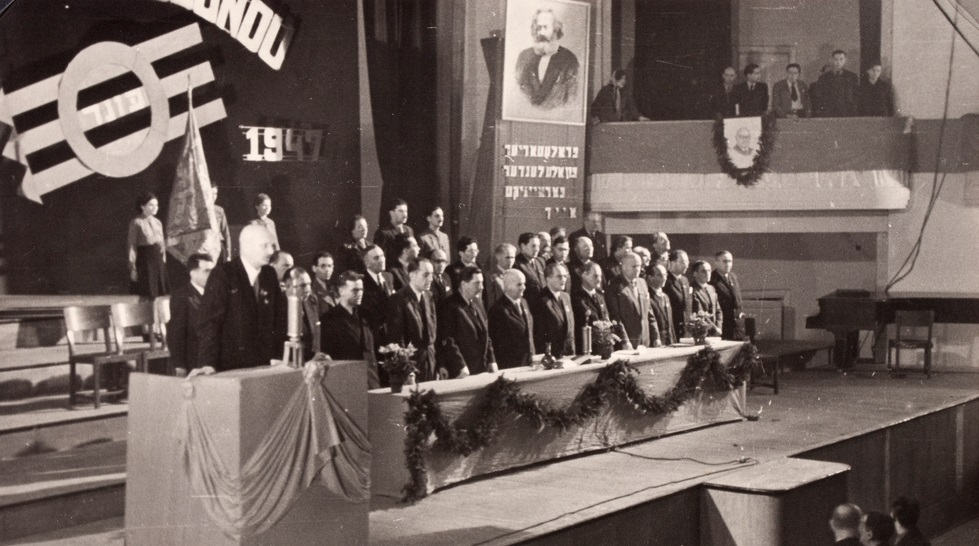
Meeting of the Bund in Poland, 15 November 1947

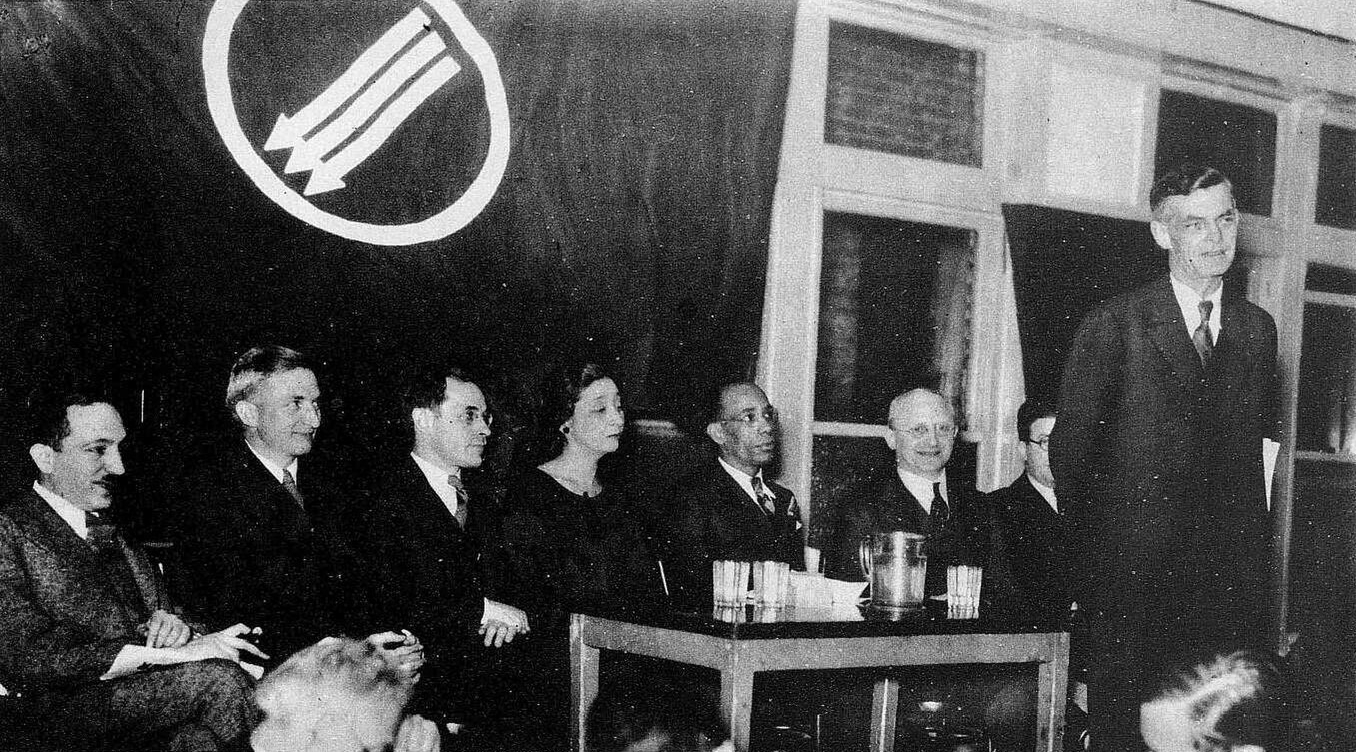
Meeting of the Bronx Socialist Centre, November 1933

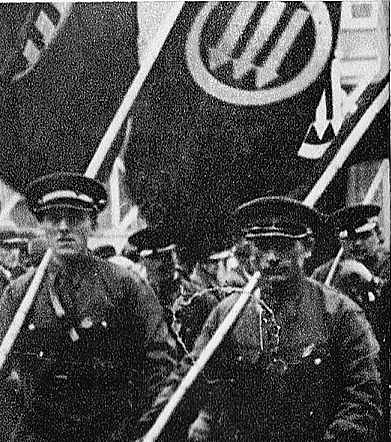
Demonstration of Akcja Socjalistyczna (Socialist Action), a paramilitary organization of the Polish Socialist Party, before 1939

Flag of the Anti-Fascist Internationalist Front (AIF) in Myanmar

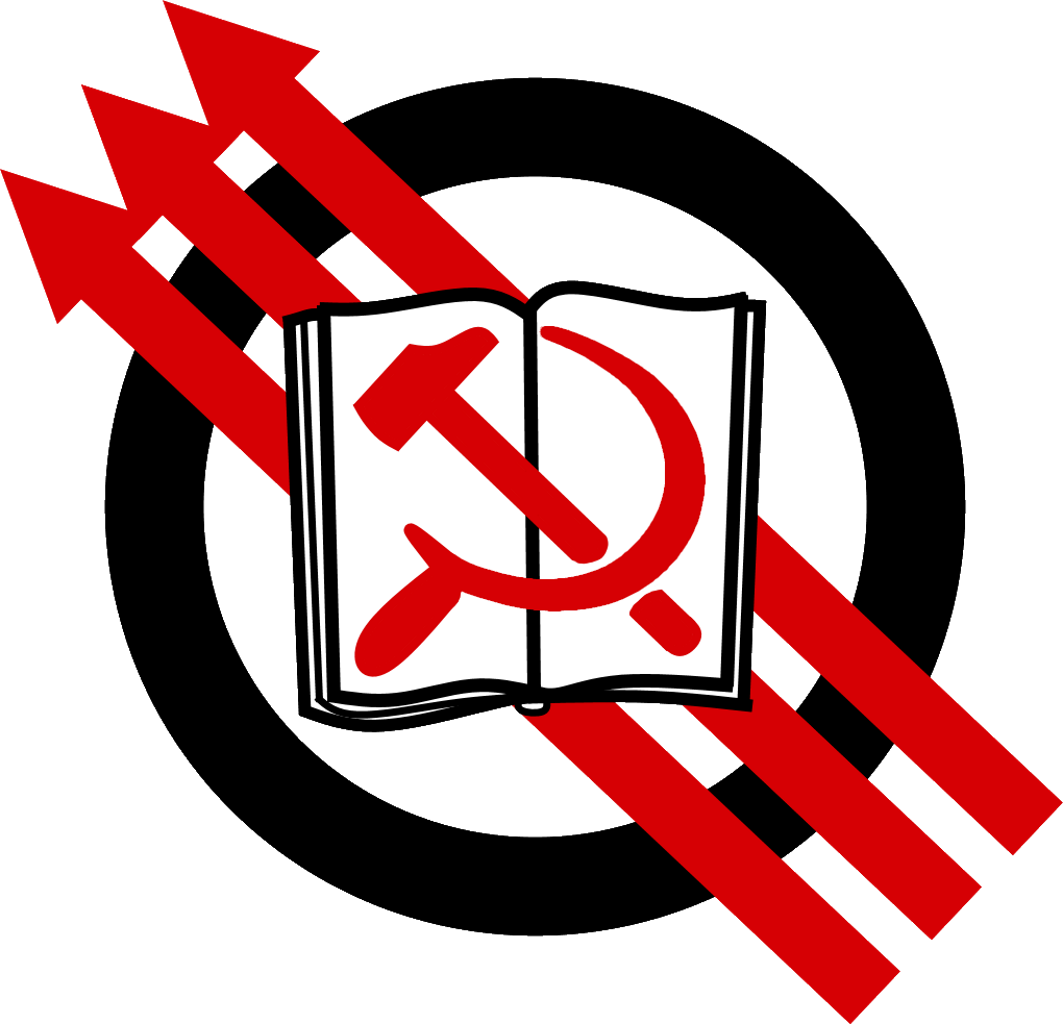
Logo of the Socialist Party of Italian Workers (PSLI)

The current logo of the Social Democratic Party in Portugal, inspired by the German Social Democrats' Three Arrows

The current flag of the Social Democratic Party of Austria

== See also ==
- Weimar paramilitary groups
- Weimar political parties
- Post–World War II anti-fascism
- Arrow (symbol)
- The Six Arrows
