= Karl Höltermann =

German Social Democratic activist, journalist, and politician

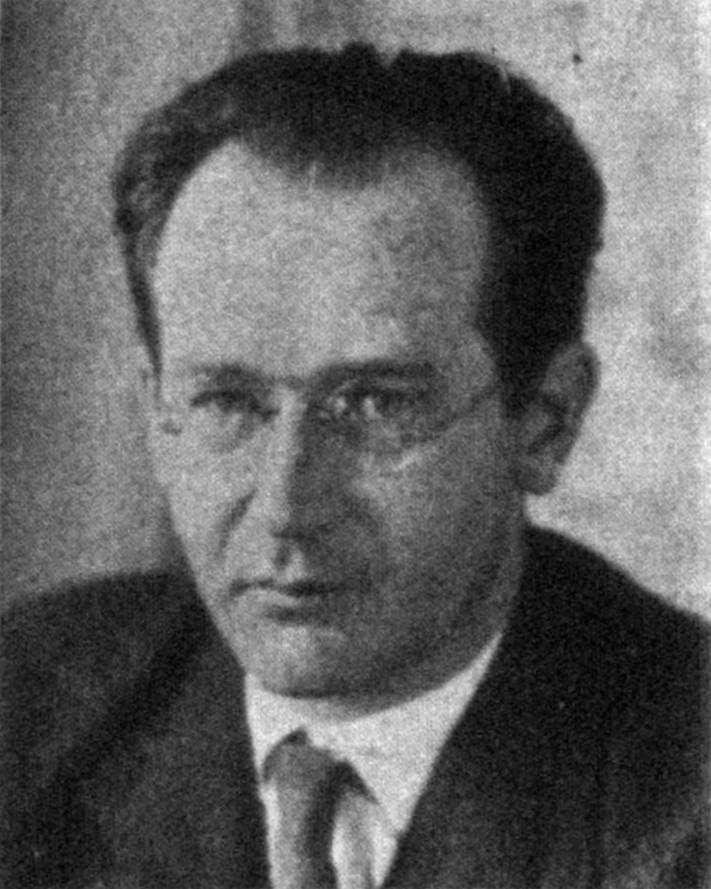
- Höltermann c. 1932

Chairman of the Reichsbanner Schwarz-Rot-Gold
- In office December 1931 – March 1933
- Preceded by: Otto Hörsing
- Succeeded by: Position abolished

Member of the Reichstag for Magdeburg
- In office 31 July 1932 – 22 June 1933
- Preceded by: Multi-member district
- Succeeded by: Constituency abolished

Personal details
- Born: 24 March 1894 Pirmasens, Palatinate, Kingdom of Bavaria, German Empire
- Died: 3 March 1955 (aged 60) Hemel Hempstead, Hertfordshire, England
- Party: SPD
- Spouse: Helene Marold (1897–1977)
- Children: Ursula; Dora; Erna Rosa
- Occupation: Political activist Journalist-editor; Politician

Karl Höltermann (20 March 1894 – 3 March 1955) was a German Social Democratic activist, journalist and politician who served as the chairman of the Reichsbanner Schwarz-Rot-Gold from 1931 until its forced dissolution in 1933. He also served as a member of the Reichstag (German parliament) for just over a year, from 1932 to 1933. By trade he started out as a typesetter, but after his wartime experiences he re-emerged as a successful party-political journalist.

== Life ==
=== Provenance and early years ===
Karl Höltermann was born in Pirmasens, a town near the German border with France and Luxembourg known, then as now, a centre of Germany's shoe manufacturing industry. Sources describe his father as "a shoe maker and trade union functionary". He was still an infant when the family relocated to Nuremberg, where he grew up, and where he was apprenticed as a typesetter. Early on he joined the Young Socialists trade union and, a little later, the Social Democratic Party. After completing his apprenticeship he took a period abroad as a wandering journeyman. The world changed in July/August 1914 with the outbreak of war, and in 1915 Höltermann was conscripted for military service. He served as a soldier on the western front between 1915 and 1919, having reached the rank of junior officer by the time he was demobilised. He was badly injured through gas poisoning in 1918, but remained on the frontline.

=== Journalism and SPD politics ===
By 1919 Höltermann was working as a journalist, initially as a trainee with the Fränkische Tagespost, a party newspaper published in Nuremberg. That was followed by a stint as a contributing editor with the Berlin-based Social Democratic Press Service. Later in 1920 he moved to Magdeburg, taking a post as political editor with Volksstimme, a regional daily newspaper at that time, which usually featured favourable coverage of the SPD. Shortly after Höltermann arrived at Volksstimme, the editor-in-chief, Paul Bader, left the paper and Höltermann took his place.

In 1922/23 he was a co-founder of "Republikanischen Notwehr" (loosely, "Republic Self-defence") in Magdeburg, an SPD group set up in response to the emergence of para-military "Freikorps" units set up in the wake of the war. These Freikorps units generally made up of disillusioned, unemployed former soldiers, and were usually organised and led by former army officers committed to a nostalgic nationalism, which put them at odds with the ideals of the German Republic. "Republikanischen Notwehr" was committed to defending the new republican order. The "Republikanischen Notwehr" had its first public outing in April 1923, by which point it was able to muster a parade of approximately 1,500 men. It very quickly became effective across the entire Prussian province of Saxony. Later, in February 1924, Höltermann teamed up with Otto Hörsing. Together, they launched Reichsbanner Schwarz-Rot-Gold, an organisation described by Otto Hörsing as a "non-partisan organisation for the protection of the [German] republic and democracy in the fight against the Swastika and the [Soviet] Red star." The "Republikanischen Notwehr" was subsumed into the Reichsbanner Schwarz-Rot-Gold: Karl Höltermann became deputy chairman of the national organisation. He also took charge of setting up and running (on an unpaid basis) "Das Reichsbanner," a national newspaper for the organisation, which was produced in Magdeburg. "Illustrierten Republikanischen Zeitung," also produced in Magdeburg by Höltermann, later joined "Das Reichsbanner" on the news-stands. Otto Hörsing had for many years been known for an eccentric approach to his regional leadership role in the party. During the latter 1920s he seems to have become increasingly scandal-prone and irascible. In 1931 matters came to a head, and a falling out with party colleagues led to Hörsing resigning from Reichsbanner. Karl Höltermann, previously Hörsing's deputy, took over the Reichsbanner's leadership duties. In December 1931 Höltermann stood as chairman in an "acting" capacity. Later in April 1932 Höltermann was elected chairman by the membership. He continued to serve until the banning of the organisation by the Nazi party, a move which came in the broader context of the cancellation of democracy in March 1933.

=== Street politics ===
The Great Depression's economic crisis during the later 1920s triggered massive unemployment and intensifying political polarisation across Germany, which increasingly spilled onto the city streets and squares. Both the communists and Nazis were increasingly open about cultivating paramilitary wings. Those still backing parties of the centre-right and centre-left - notably the SPD - were less attracted by this style of politics, but there was nevertheless a powerful yearning for protection from the hooligan extremists. In 1931 Karl Höltermann was instrumental in setting up the "Eiserne Front" (Iron Front) republic protection organisation. Support for the Iron Front came from the SPD, the mainstream (i.e. non-communist) trades union confederation and from the increasingly politicised associations and groupings of sports clubs.

=== Parliament and the end of democracy ===
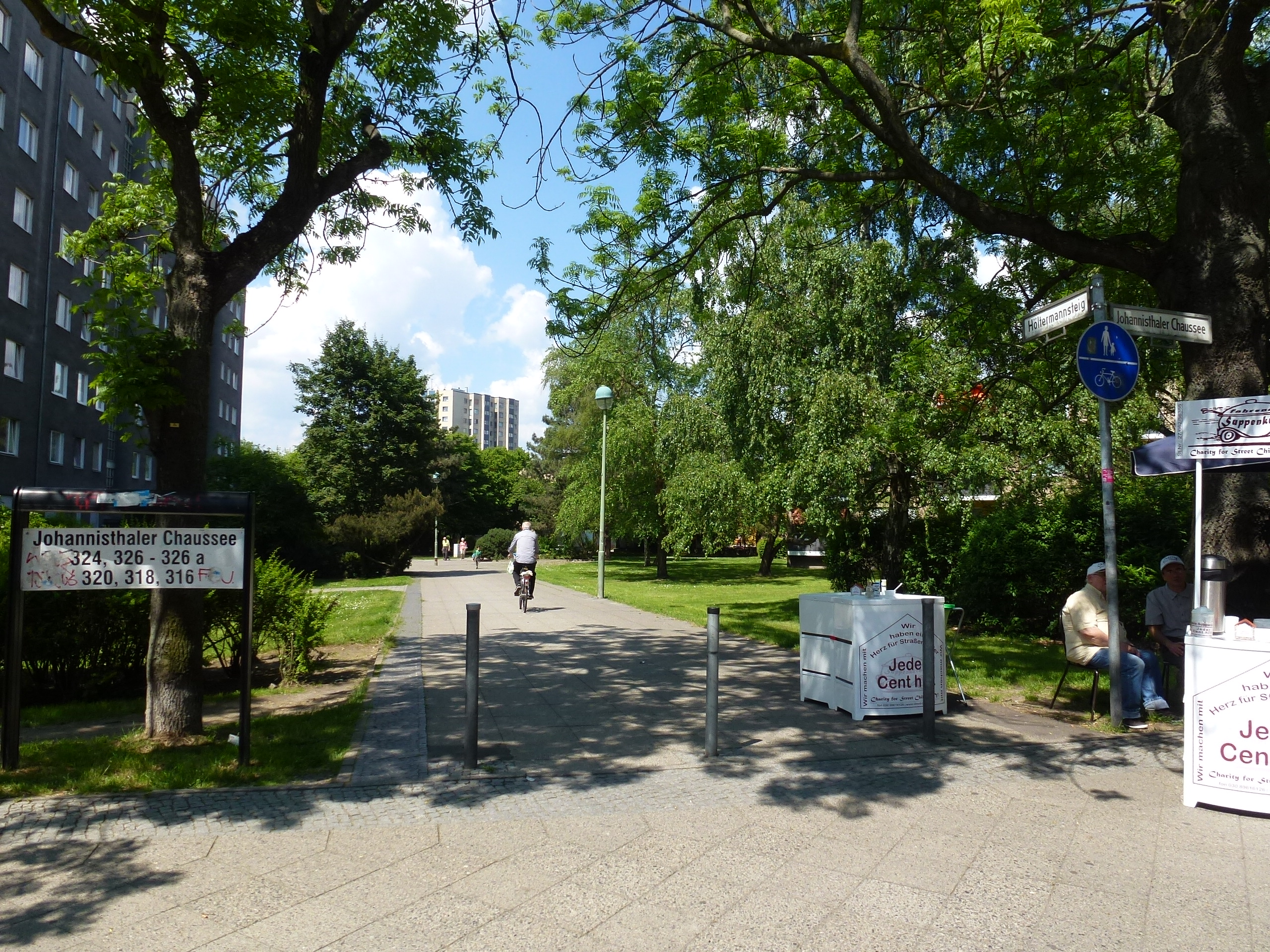
In the Berlin district of Gropiusstadt a pathway named after Karl Höltermann provides pedestrian and cycle access to the maternity unit.

- "Governments come and go .... After Hitler it will be our turn! It will be the German republicans who will again have to clear up the wreckage. We prepare for that day!"
- "Regierungen kommen und gehen. [...] Nach Hitler kommen wir! Es werden wieder die deutschen Republikaner sein, die einen Scherbenhaufen aufräumen müssen. Auf diesen Tag richten wir uns ein!"

Karl Höltermann, concluding his address to the final general assembly of the Reichsbanner organisation, 18 February 1933

Between July 1932 and (notionally) June 1933 Karl Höltermann also sat in the Reichstag (national parliament), as an SPD member, representing Electoral District 10 (Magdeburg). Sources are silent on his parliamentary contributions. By 1932 the Reichstag had become for most purposes ineffective: it was deadlocked, with the moderate parties unwilling to enter into any sort of a coalition with the National Socialists and the Communist Party, both of whom were bitterly hostile toward the SPD (whom the communists termed social fascists). Had the National Socialists and the Communist Party entered into a coalition after the November 1932 election they would have jointly commanded a Reichstag majority, but such a coalition was unthinkable for both parties. The National Socialist leader in any case had other plans, and used the parliamentary deadlock to maneuver his party into a semi-constitutional power grab, which took effect in January 1933. The Hitler government now lost no time in transforming Germany into a one-party dictatorship. At the end of February the newly reconfigured security services used the Reichstag fire as a pretext for a wave of arrests beginning 28 February 1933. Their lists of their political opponents were, at this stage, still up to date. Their first detainees were almost all Communist Party members. However many leading members of other parties were also taken into custody during the weeks that followed. Karl Höltermann, as a known Nazi opponent, and because of his position as leader of Reichsbanner Schwarz-Rot-Gold, was in particular danger. For several months he lived "underground" (i.e. unregistered and therefore illegally), hidden in Berlin. In May 1933 he managed to flee the country, escaping to Amsterdam. By this time Helena, his wife, had been taken into custody by the security services, along with their family.

=== Exile ===
For the next couple of years he lived in Belgium and then in the Saarland. The Saarland had been under French military occupation since 1919, and was for most purposes beyond the reach of the German security services. Early in 1935 the region was returned to German rule, however. Many opponents of Nazism who had taken refuge in the Saarland were imprisoned by Nazi forces. A German arrest warrant had been issued against Höltermann in 1934, but he nevertheless evaded capture, instead fleeing to London. On 11 June 1935 the Höltermann family were formally relieved of their German citizenship, which left them stateless. He lived with his family in England throughout the rest of the Hitler years and beyond.

Relatively little is known about Höltermann's final two decades of his life. He was able to network with fellow political exiles from Germany. One source mentions an attempt to set up an "alternative" London-based SPD leadership team, which came to nothing, as did his efforts to reconstitute Reichsbanner Schwarz-Rot-Gold from exile, and use it to coordinate or at least encourage resistance back in Germany. Shortly before the outbreak of World War II in September 1939, Karl Höltermann was one of three London-based German anti-Nazis proposed by Group Captain Malcolm Grahame Christie to Foreign Ministry Mandarin Lord Vansittart for membership of a putative "German advisory committee." The British authorities, however, did not pursue the idea. Several sources document other exiled German political refugees in London refer to a group of former German parliamentarians working with Höltermann, without spelling out the nature or extent of the group's activism. After 1942 Höltermann withdrew completely from any ongoing political engagement by the British-based exile community.

According to one source the arrest warrant issued against Höltermann in 1934 remained in force throughout his entire period of exile. After World War II ended for Germany in May 1945, along with the end of the Hitler nightmare, any outstanding warrant from 1934 was of no relevance. Between 1945 and 1955 Höltermann made a number of visits to the three occupation zones, which in May 1949 constituted West Germany. A British "Naturalisation Certificate" was issued for his daughter on 5 August 1947, at which point the family were living in Kings Langley, a prosperous commuter village short distance outside London, and close to St Albans. Karl Höltermann remained in England until he died a couple of weeks short of what would have been his sixty-first birthday, on 3 March 1955.

== Brother ==
Karl Höltermann's younger brother was the Bavarian politician Arthur Höltermann.
