= Sergei Chakhotin =

Russian microbiologist and sociologist

- Сергей Чахотин
- Born: Sergei Stepanovich Chakhotin; 13 September 1883; Istanbul, Ottoman Empire
- Died: 24 December 1973 (aged 90); Moscow, Russian SFSR, Soviet Union
- Education: Third Odessa Gymnasium (Gold Medal); University of Heidelberg (Doctorate)
- Alma mater: Imperial Moscow University
- Notable work: Dreipfeil gegen Hakenkreuz (1933); Le viol des foules par la propagande politique (1939)
- Movement: Social democracy; Anti-fascism
- Children: 7
- Honours: Honorary Doctorate in Biology (1960, Ministry of Higher and Middle Special Education)
- Scientific career
- Fields: Biology; Zoology; Oncology; Sociology
- Institutions: Heidelberg University; University of Messina; Russian Academy of Sciences (Laboratory of Physiology); Kaiser Wilhelm Institut für medizinische Forschung; Academy of Sciences of the Soviet Union

Sergei Stepanovich Chakhotin (Note: His surname is also transliterated as Chakotin, Tschachotin or Tchakhotine.) (Russian: Серге́й Степа́нович Чахо́тин; 13 September 1883 – 24 December 1973) was a Russian biologist, sociologist and social democrat.

Chakhotin was the inventor of a technique of "cell optical microsurgery". He applied the ideas of Frederick Winslow Taylor and Ivan Pavlov in developing a theory of political propaganda which he applied in opposing the Bolshevik regime (1917–1919) and the rise of fascism in Europe (in Germany 1930–1933; Denmark 1933–1934; and France 1934–1945). He wrote extensively on organization theory, particularly on the "scientific organization of labour" (Russian: Научная Организация Труда, romanized: Nauchnaya Organizatsiya Truda; also known as NOT).

== Life ==
=== Early life ===
Chakhotin was born on 13 September 1883, in Istanbul (then in the Ottoman Empire), the son of the Russian consul Stepan Ivanovich Chakhotin. His father had previously been a private secretary to Ivan Turgenev, before pursuing a diplomatic career which led to him becoming a consular interpreter in Istanbul. His mother, Alexandra Motzo, was Greek, and in 1893 he moved with her to Odessa. After graduating from the Third Odessa Gymnasium with a Gold Medal in 1900, Chakhotin enrolled in the Medical Faculty of Moscow University. Participation in a student protest in 1902 resulted in his arrest, incarceration in the Butyrki prison, and exile abroad. In Munich, he enrolled in the Faculty of Medicine and attended the lectures of Wilhelm Konrad Röntgen. He obtained a Doctorate in Zoology (summa cum laude) from the University of Heidelberg in 1907. In Heidelberg he studied problems of zoology under Professor Johann Adam Otto Bütschli, and oncology under Professor V. Čzerny. In 1907, he was invited to the University of Messina by Professor Alberico Benedicenti, Director of the Laboratory for Research in Marine biology, where he engaged in research into mono-cellular organisms, including the Pterotrachea. Chakhotin suffered a spinal injury during the 1908 Messina earthquake. Following recovery, he resumed research in the Zoological Station of Anton Dhorn in Naples and in the Marine Zoological Station of Villefranche-sur-Mer. Following visits to Odessa, Moscow and Kazan in 1909, Chakhotin returned to Heidelberg where, in 1912, he devised a technique of "cell optical microsurgery", using ultra-violet rays projected through a quartz lens and a narrow opening in a metal disc. In 1912 he took up a position in St. Petersburg as assistant in the Laboratory of Physiology of the Imperial Academy of Sciences under Ivan Petrovich Pavlov. He continued to work under Pavlov until 1918, returning occasionally to Villefranche-sur-mer and Naples for research purposes.

=== Involvement in the Russian Revolution and Civil War: 1915–1919 ===
In 1915, Chakhotin was involved with the Committee for Military-Technical Assistance (Komitet Voenno-Technicheskoi Pomoschi), which liaised with technical, industrial and scientific experts in order to mobilise them for the war effort. His role was that of general secretary of the Bureau for Organizing Morale, a section dedicated to propaganda. Chakhotin claimed to have been, on the eve of the February Revolution of 1917, a member of the "Defencist" group of Social Democrats around G.V. Plekhanov. He worked briefly for the Provisional Government and, following the October Revolution, in the propaganda departments of the Volunteer Army under General Anton Denikin and the Don Army under General Pyotr Krasnov. He left the service of Krasnov when the latter entered into negotiations with the Germans in Ukraine. He left Russia in 1919.

=== Change of Landmarks ===
In emigration, Chakhotin came to the conclusion that opposition to the Bolshevik regime was futile: the émigré intelligentsia should contribute to Russia's economic recovery, promoting the new principles of organization developed in the West in order to "Americanize" Russian industrial production. In Paris in 1920 he delivered a paper To Canossa!, (Note: The title references a common Continental European saying ("going to Canossa"), itself a reference to the historic Walk to Canossa. In modern usage, it refers to an act of penance or submission. To "go to Canossa" is an expression that describes doing penance, often with the connotation that it is unwilling or coerced.) in which he argued this case to a circle that included Yu. V. Kliuchnikov, S. S. Lukyanov, A. V. Bobrishchev-Pushkin and Yu. N. Potekhin, with whom he founded the "Change of Landmarks" group (Smena vekh). In 1921 his paper was included in an anthology published under this title in Prague. The group published a weekly journal with the same title in Paris from 29 October 1921—25 March 1922. In March 1922, on the eve of the Genoa Conference, the Soviet government approved the publication of a daily paper in Berlin, "On the eve" (Nakanune). As members of the editorial board, Chakhotin and Kliuchnikov attended and reported on the Genoa conference. By 1924, when the paper closed down, Chakhotin had published around 40 articles in Nakanune.

=== Campaigning against Nazism: 1930–1933 ===
The Three Arrows symbol of the Iron Front was co-authored by Chakhotin.

From 1926, Chakhotin resumed his work on cell micro-surgery and embarked on new work on cancer research in the Institute of Experimental Pharmacology of the University of Genoa. In 1929, with the support of Albert Einstein, he obtained a three-year grant from the Research Foundation of America, which enabled him to take up a research position at the Kaiser William Medical Institute (Kaiser Wilhelm Institut für medizinische Forschung) in Heidelberg the following year. Chakhotin's years in Germany involved intense political activity. At the end of 1931, he and fellow members of the Reichsbanner Schwarz-Rot-Gold, a socialist defence league, waged a "war of graffiti" in Heidelberg, defacing the swastikas on Nazi posters with a single white arrow. In 1932, he campaigned with the Iron Front (Eiserne Front) against the Nazis, alongside the German Social Democrat, Carlo Mierendorff. Chakhotin designed the Three Arrows, the symbol of the Iron Front. With Mierendorff, he published Foundations and Forms of Political Propaganda (German: Grundlagen und Formen politischer Propaganda). His writings of this period provided the foundations for his key work on crowd psychology and propaganda techniques — Le viol des foules par la propaganda politique (Paris, 1939). On 22 April 1933, following police searches at his home and laboratory, Chakhotin was dismissed from the Kaiser Wilhelm Institute.

=== Scientific and political work in France ===
The symbol of the French Section of the Workers' International uses the Three Arrows.

Following a brief stay in Denmark in 1934, Chakhotin took up residence in France where he obtained a succession of posts in the Collège de France, the Institut Prophylactique de Paris, the Hôpital Léopold Bellan, and the Institut de biologie physico-chimique). During most of his time in France his material situation was precarious. Politically he became involved with the radical wing of the SFIO, in particular with Marceau Pivert and Jean Zyromsky and the Jeunesse Socialiste where he established himself as an authority in anti-fascist propaganda. By 1936, he had become an assistant to Marceau Pivert, eventual Secretary of the Federation of the Seine of the SFIO and head of propaganda for the SFIO at the outset of the Popular Front government. The Three Arrows symbol became current in the propaganda of the SFIO and of Pivert's group, the "Gauche Révolutionaire". In 1939, his key work Le viol des foules par la propaganda politique was published in Paris. Shortly after the release, it was removed from bookshops by the French police, and was formally banned, with copies being destroyed when the Germans occupied France in 1940. In June 1941, following the German invasion of the USSR, Chakhotin was arrested and held in an internment camp in Compiègne. He was released on 23 January 1942, thanks to a character reference provided by four distinguished German scientists. The prison authorities had been unaware of his authorship of Le viol des foules. In early 1944, Chakhotin was invited to assist the Fondation française pour l'étude des problèmes humains under the Nobel Prize-winning medical scientist Alexis Carrel in constructing a scientific data base, and to advise on the application of the biological sciences to the social sciences. His monthly fee of 5,000 francs provided an adequate income after years of penury. However, on 8 March 1944 he resigned from the Fondation following allegations of Carrel's association with the Pétain regime.

=== Return to the Soviet Union ===
In 1954, Chakhotin left France to work once again with Alberico Benedicenti at the Institute of Experimental Pharmacology of the University of Genoa. Some time later he moved to Rome to work in the Pharmacological Institute and in the Institute of Public Health (Italian: Instituto Superiore della Sanità). He remained in Italy until 1958. In October 1937, Chakhotin had declined the offer of a scientific post in Soviet Russia. However, in April 1958 he accepted a position at the Institute of Cytology of the Academy of Sciences in Leningrad where he worked until 1960. He delivered lectures at the Institute of Cytology; at the Institute of Microbiology of the Academy of Sciences; at the Sixth All-Union Congress of Anatomists, Histologists and Embryologists in Kiev in 1958; at the Congress of Physiologists in Minsk in 1959; before the Society of Physiologists in Leningrad in 1959; to the Institute of Cytology and Zoology in Leningrad; to the Institute of Animal Morphology in Moscow; to Moscow State University; to the Institute of Experimental Pathology and Therapy in Sukhumi. He gave demonstrations of his methods and technical apparatus at the International Symposium on Radio-Biology in Moscow in 1960. On 28 May 1960, he was awarded an Honorary Doctorate in Biology by the Ministry of Higher and Middle Special Education. In late 1960 he took up a position as Head of the Laboratory of Micro-Beam Surgery of the Institute of Biophysics of the Academy of Sciences in Moscow. On 16 September 1967, he transferred to the Institute of the Biology of Development of the Academy of Sciences. From 1 July 1970, he had the status of scientific consultant at the Institute, in which he worked until his death.

Sergei Chakhotin died on 24 December 1973 in Moscow.

== Personal life ==
Sergei Stepanovich had three brothers: Ivan, Stepan and Nikolai. His brother Stepan (1888–1931) was an accomplished poet and graphic artist in the style of the "World of Art" (Mir iskusstva). In 1928, he produced a series of drawings for Sergei's memoir on the Messina earthquake. These are reproduced in the edition published in Messina in 2008. Stepan was shot by the Soviet regime on 15 July 1931.

Sergei Chakhotin was married five times and had seven sons (a first child died in childbirth). According to his wishes, his ashes were scattered in the island of Corsica which he frequently visited as an amateur painter, and where he and his first wife had taken a belated honeymoon in 1908.

== Key works ==
- Chakhotin, Sergei Stepanovich. Organizatsiya. Printsipy, metody v proizvodstve, torgovle, administratsii i politike (Berlin, "Opyt", 1923; Gosizdat, Moscow-Petrograd, 1924; 2nd edition Gosizdat, Leningrad, 1925).
- Tschachotin, Sergei (1933). Dreipfeil gegen Hakenkreuz [Three Arrows against the Swastika] (in German). Kopenhagen: Verlag Aktiver Sozialismus.
- Tchakhotine, Serge (1952) [1939]. Le viol des foules par la propagande politique (in French) (2nd revised ed.). Paris: Gallimard. The 1st French edition has been translated as:
  - Chakhotin, Serge (1940). The rape of the masses. The psychology of totalitarian political propaganda. Translated by Dickes, E. W. London: George Routledge & Sons. New York: Alliance Book Corporation (Open Library: OL6411667M). The term "totalitarian" does not figure in the title of the French editions of 1939 or 1952 but was added in the English language editions of 1940. The English translation of 1940 has been re-printed by Routledge [London, 2017].
  - Psikhicheskoye nasiliye nad massami Психическое насилие над массами (in Russian). Yaroslavl State University. 2016.
  - Other translations exist in Esperanto, Italian, Japanese, Portuguese and Romanian.

== See also ==
- Three Arrows
