= Committee for Military-Technical Assistance =

The Committee for Military-Technical Assistance (Russian: Комитет Военно-Технической Помощи) was an organisation set up in 1915 by the Tsarist authorities to ensure greater collaboration between industrial and technical experts and the Russian war effort.

== Sections ==
The Bureau for Organizing Morale was set up under the Menshevik Sergei Chakhotin. Its role was to produce propaganda for the war effort.

== See also ==
- War Industry Committees
