= Smenovekhovtsy =

Russian émigré political movement of the 1920s

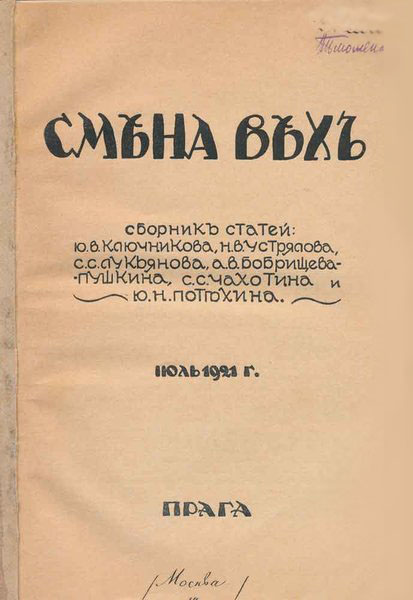
Cover of the magazine Smena Vekh. July 1921

The Smenovekhovtsy (Russian: Сменовеховцы, IPA: [smʲɪnɐˈvʲexəftsɨ]) was a political movement in the Russian émigré community, formed shortly after the publication of the magazine Smena Vekh ("Change of Signposts") in Prague in 1921. This publication had taken its name from the Russian philosophical publication Vekhi ("Signposts") published in 1909.

== Ideology ==
The ideas in the publication soon evolved into the Smenovekhovstvo movement, which promoted the concept of accepting the Soviet regime and the October Revolution of 1917 as a natural and popular progression of Russia's fate. Smenovekhovstvo encouraged its members to return to Soviet Russia, predicting that the Soviet Union would not last and would give way to a revival of Russian nationalism.

Smenovekhovtsy supported co-operation with the Soviet government in the hope that the Soviet state would evolve back into a "bourgeois state". Such cooperation was important for the Soviets, since the whole Russian "White diaspora" included 3 million people. The leaders of smenovekhovstvo were mostly former Mensheviks, Kadets and some Octobrists. Nikolay Ustryalov (1890–1937) led the group. On March 26, 1922, the first issue of Nakanune (Russian: Накануне, lit. 'On the eve', the Smenovekhovtsy newspaper) was published; Soviet Russia's first successes in foreign policy were praised. Throughout its career, Nakanune was subsidised by the Soviet government. Alexey Tolstoy had become acquainted with the movement in the summer of 1921. In April 1922, he published an open letter addressed to émigré leader Nikolai Tchaikovsky, and defended the Soviet government for ensuring Russia's unity and for preventing attacks from the neighbouring countries, especially during the Polish-Soviet War of 1919–1921.

== Opposition ==
Conservative émigrés such as those in the Russian All-Military Union (founded in 1924) opposed the Smenoveknovstvo movement, viewing it as a promotion of defeatism and moral relativism, as a capitulation to the Bolsheviks, and as desirous of seeking compromise with the new Soviet regime. Repeatedly, the Smenoveknovtsi faced accusations of ties with the Soviet secret-police organisation OGPU, which had in fact been active in promoting such ideas in the émigré community. On the Smenovekhovstvo movement in October 1921, Soviet leader Vladimir Lenin commented: "The Smenovekhovtsy express the moods of thousands of various bourgeois or Soviet collaborators, who are the participants of our New Economic Policy."

== History ==
Representatives of the Smenovekhovtsy who settled in the Soviet Union did not survive the end of the 1930s; almost all the former leaders of the movement were arrested by the NKVD and executed at a later date. The biologist Sergei Chakhotin returned to the Soviet Union only after Stalin's death, in 1958, and thus was the sole one of the authors of Smena Vekh to escape repressions.

There were other émigré organizations which, like the Smenoveknovtsy, argued that Russian émigrés should accept the fact of the Russian revolution. These included the Young Russians (Mladorossi) and the Eurasians (Evraziitsi). As with the Smenovekhovtsy, these movements did not survive after World War II. Ukrainian émigrés also fostered a movement in favour of reconciliation with the Soviet regime and of return to the homeland. This included some of the most prominent pre-revolutionary intellectuals such as Mykhailo Hrushevskyi (1866–1934) and Volodymyr Vynnychenko (1880–1951). The Soviet Ukrainian government funded a Ukrainian emigre journal called Nova Hromada (first published in July 1923) to encourage this trend. The Soviets referred to this movement as a Ukrainian Smena Vekh, as did its opponents among the Ukrainian emigres, who saw it as a defeatist expression of Little Russian Russophilia. For this reason, the actual proponents of the trend rejected the label of Smenovekhovtsy.

According to Anatoliy Golitsyn, a KGB officer who defected in 1961, the movement was controlled by the OGPU.

"[it] was used by the Soviet service to mislead émigres and intellectuals in Europe into believing that the strength of communist ideology was on the wane and that the Soviet regime was evolving into a more moderate, national state."

== Bibliography ==
- Christopher Gilley, The 'Change of Signposts' in the Ukrainian Emigration. A Contribution to the History of Sovietophilism in the 1920s, Stuttgart: ibidem, 2009.
- Anatoliy Golitsyn, New Lies for Old, Dodd, Mead, 1984
- Hilda Hardeman, Coming to Terms with the Soviet Regime. The "Changing Signposts" Movement among Russian Émigrés in the Early 1920s, Dekalb: Northern Illinois University Press, 1994.
- M.V. Nazarov, The Mission of the Russian Emigration, Moscow: Rodnik, 1994. ISBN 5-86231-172-6
- "Changing Landmarks" in Russian Berlin, 1922-1924 by Robert C. Williams in Slavic Review Vol. 27, No. 4 (Dec., 1968), pp. 581–593

== See also ==
- Nikolay Vasilyevich Ustryalov
- National Bolshevism
