= Young People's Socialist League (Socialist Party USA) =

Youth arm of the Socialist Party USA (1989–2010)

- Chairman: Various
- Founded: October 1989
- Preceded by: Young People's Socialist League (1907)
- Dissolved: November 2010
- Headquarters: Chicago, Illinois
- Mother party: Socialist Party USA
- Website: http://socialistparty-usa.org/ypsl/index.html

The Young People's Socialist League (YPSL), founded in 1989, was the official youth arm of the Socialist Party USA. The group comprised party members under the age of 30. It shared the same name as the Young People's Socialist League, which was affiliated with the Socialist Party of America.

== Organizational history ==
=== Socialist Party of America renamed as Social Democrats, USA ===
In its 1972 Convention, the majority of delegates voted to change the name of the Socialist Party of America name to "Social Democrats, USA" by a vote of 73 to 34. The change of name was supported by the two Co-Chairmen, Bayard Rustin and Charles S. Zimmerman (of the International Ladies Garment Workers Union, ILGWU), and by the First National Vice Chairman, James S. Glaser; these three were re-elected by acclamation.

=== National convention of 1972 ===
The Convention elected a national committee of 33 members, with 22 seats for the majority caucus, 8 seats for Harrington's coalition caucus, 2 for the Debs caucus, and one for the "independent" Samuel H. Friedman, who also had opposed the name change.

The convention voted on and adopted proposals for its program by a two-one vote, with the majority caucus winning every vote. A Vice Chairman of the Young People's Socialist League (YPSL), Carl Gershman introduced the international program that was approved. It called for "firmness toward Communist aggression". However, on the Vietnam War, the program opposed "any efforts to bomb Hanoi into submission" and to work for a peace agreement that would protect Communist political cadres in South Vietnam from further military or police reprisals. Harrington's proposal for an immediate cease fire and an immediate withdrawal of U.S. forces was defeated. Harrington complained that, after its previous convention, the Socialist Party had endorsed George McGovern with a statement of "constructive criticism" and had not mobilized enough support for McGovern.

After their defeat at the Convention, some members of the minority caucuses left: at most 200 members of the Coalition Caucus led by Michael Harrington went on to form the Democratic Socialist Organizing Committee (later becoming the Democratic Socialists of America), some former members of the Debs Caucus led the formation of the "Socialist Party of the United States of America".

=== National convention of 1974 ===
The official YPSL continued its existence as the youth section of Social Democrats, USA. The group held a six-day-long "National School" in conjunction with its 1974 Convention, held from December 26 to 31 at Malibu, California. A bevy of prominent speakers addressed the gathering, which was coordinated by National Secretary Paul Landsbergis, with lecturers including Sidney Hook, Tom Kahn, SDUSA Executive Director Carl Gershman, professors Seymour Martin Lipset and Robert Scalapino, and representatives of the A. Philip Randolph Institute and the American Federation of Teachers.

=== Socialist Party USA reformation, dissolution, and reorganization ===
In 1989, the Socialist Party USA relaunched the YPSL as the official youth arm of the Party. In 2010, the YPSL was dissolved and its members were absorbed into the SPUSA.

At the 2011 National Convention, the resolution to revive the YPSL was passed. As stated in the National Convention Pre-Convention Discussion Bulletin, "Having a youth affiliation will help the SPUSA tap into the radicalization of youth around the country. Locals around the country are already involved in several campus issues from rising tuition, loan debt, jobs, and many other issues. The SPUSA and YPSL combination will help revitalize the party, and tap into an abundant source of Socialist energy and spirit."

However, "It is understood that the SPUSA cannot, and will not form YPSL on it's [sic] own. It will be up [to] those YPSL members themselves to do so. The SPUSA will only help support the re-founding with funds, organizing, and other skills as are available."

== Organizational logo ==
YPSL's traditional symbol is the "Three Arrows", which has been interpreted differently over the course of the emblem's existence. The arrows are today meant to symbolize the three ways in which humanity works for a better society. They are:

- Education - YPSL publishes pamphlets and magazines and holds educational forum meetings
- Direct Action - YPSL engages in protests, non-violent demonstrations and engages in strike support
- Elections - Through its parent organization, the Socialist Party USA, YPSL supports candidates for public office

American use of the "Three Arrows" logo originated in the fall of 1933 with the organization of a uniformed "Socialist Vanguard" in New York City, in which about 40 squads of eight members, each squad headed by a "captain" were formed. The Vanguard wore distinctive royal blue shirts and bore a new organizational logo, which was described in the official monthly newspaper of the YPSL:

Three arrows enclosed in a circle is the emblem of the Vanguard, borrowed from the now-destroyed Iron Front in Germany. The arrows stand for the slogan of the Young People's Socialist League: "Organization, education, solidarity."

In the German context, the "Three Arrows" logo was a social democratic symbol designed by Sergei Chakhotin, former assistant to the physiologist Ivan Pavlov in 1931. The circular logo was designed so as to be able to easily cover Nazi swastikas.

The three arrows originally stood for the Social Democratic Party of Germany (SPD) opposition to three enemies of democracy: communism, monarchism, and fascism (in Germany: Nazism).
