= Otto Hörsing =

German social democratic politician (1874–1937)

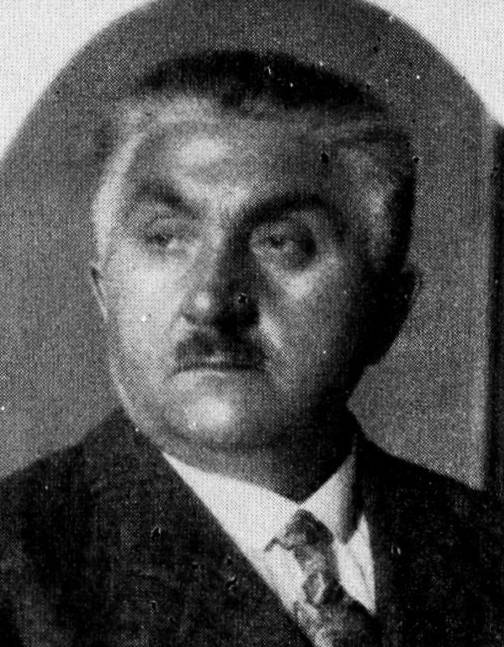
- Hörsing c. 1932

Chairman of the Reichsbanner Schwarz-Rot-Gold
- In office February 1924 – December 1931
- Preceded by: Position established
- Succeeded by: Karl Höltermann

Member of the Landtag of Prussia
- In office 5 January 1925 – 31 March 1933
- Preceded by: Constituency established
- Succeeded by: Multi-member district

Member of the Reichstag
- In office 6 February 1919 – 19 November 1922
- Preceded by: Multi-member district
- Succeeded by: Constituency abolished

Personal details
- Born: 18 July 1874 Groß Schilleningken, Province of Prussia, German Empire
- Died: 16 August 1937 (aged 63) Berlin, Nazi Germany
- Party: SPD (before 1932); SRPD (after 1932)
- Occupation: Blacksmith

Friedrich Otto Hörsing (18 July 1874 – 16 August 1937) was a German Social Democratic politician who served as chairman of the Reichsbanner Schwarz-Rot-Gold from its foundation in 1924 until 1931. He also served as a member of the Reichstag (German parliament) from 1919 to 1922, and the Landtag of Prussia from 1925 to 1933.

== Biography ==
Hörsing was born in Groß Schilleningken near Memel, East Prussia (today Šilininkai, Lithuania), and was trained to work as a blacksmith in his youth. He joined the Social Democratic Party (SPD) in 1894, became the Executive Secretary of the German Association of Metalworkers in Upper Silesia in 1905 and District Secretary of the SPD in Oppeln (1906–1914).

He served in the German Army in World War I and became a prisoner of war in Romania. After the war he returned to Silesia and became chairman of the Workers' and Soldiers' Council of Upper Silesia in Kattowitz in 1919.

In 1919 and 1920 Hörsing was the Reichs- und Staatskommissar for Silesia and Posen and the Oberpräsident of the Province of Saxony in 1920 until 1927.

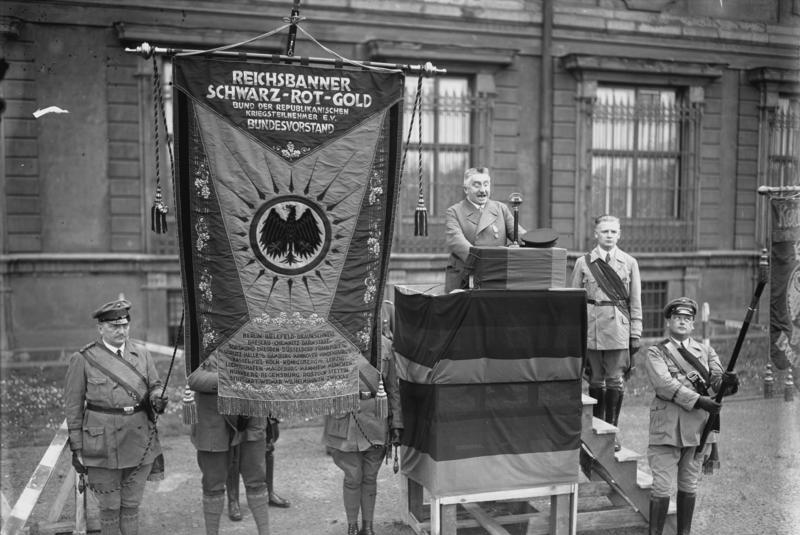
Otto Hörsing on 11 August 1929

He was a member of the Weimar National Assembly (1919), the Reichstag in 1919–22 and the Prussian Landtag (1924–1933). Hörsing represented the Province of Saxony in the Reichsrat in 1922–1930 and was a co-founder and the first Chairman of the Reichsbanner Schwarz-Rot-Gold (1924–32), which he described as a 'non-partisan protection organization of the Republic and democracy in the fight against the swastika and the soviet star'.

In 1932, Hörsing founded the Sozial-Republikanische Partei Deutschlands after he was expelled from the SPD and the Reichsbanner. In the Reichstag election of November 1932, this new organization received only 8,395 votes.

Following the Nazi take over in 1933, they banned all opposition parties and discontinued Hörsing's pension benefits. He died impoverished in Berlin in 1937.
