= Nikolai Ustryalov =

Russian academic (1890–1937)

- Николай Васильевич Устрялов
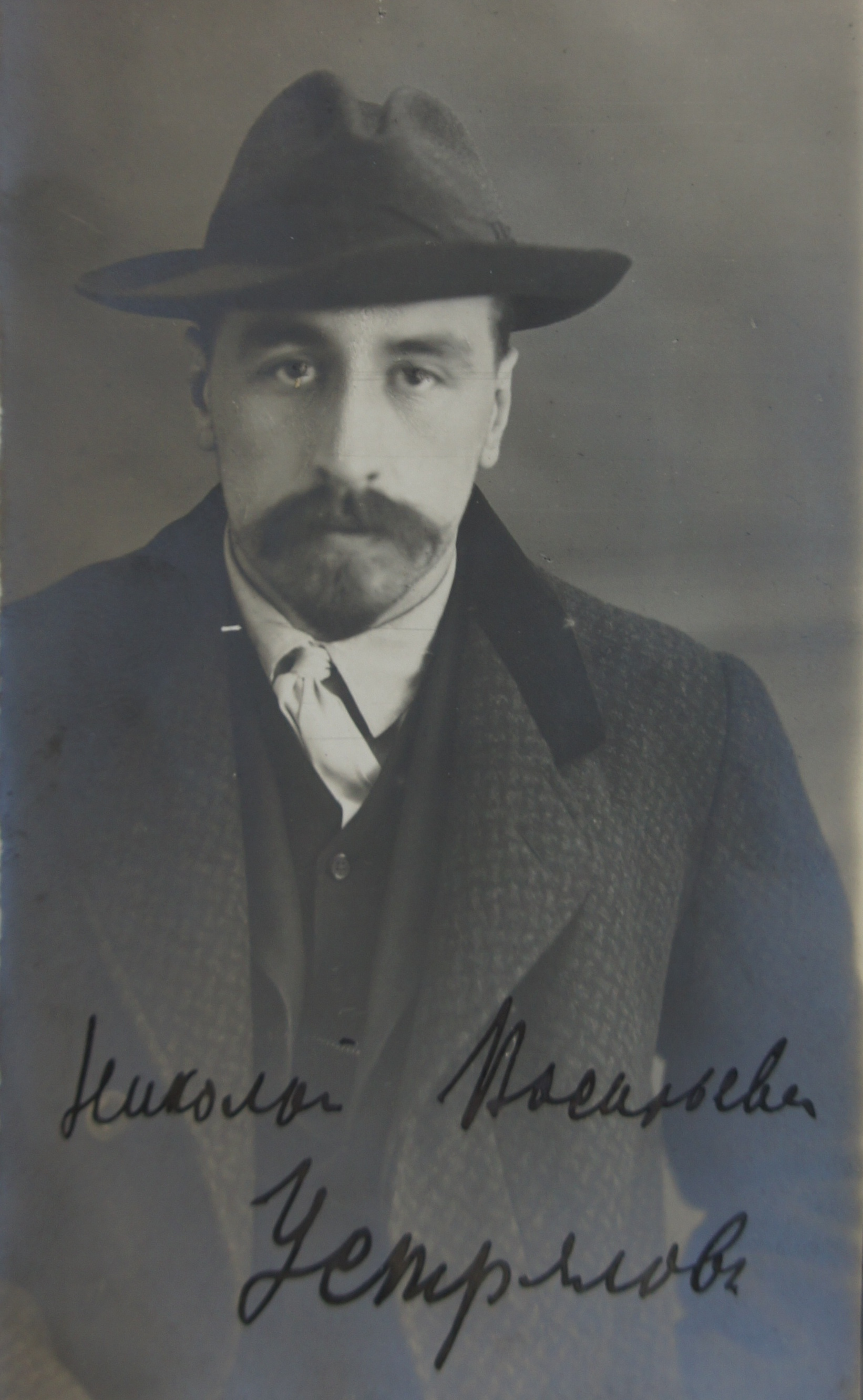
- Born: November 25, 1890; Saint Petersburg, Russian Empire
- Died: September 14, 1937 (aged 46); Moscow, Russian SFSR, Soviet Union
- Cause of death: Execution by shooting
- Occupation: University lecturer
- Employer: Moscow University
- Known for: Writer, politician
- Notable work: Smena vekh (1921)
- Political party: Constitutional Democratic Party
- Other political affiliations: Smenovekhovtsy
- Relatives: Nikolay Gerasimovich Ustryalov (great uncle)

Nikolai Vasilyevich Ustryalov (Russian: Николай Васильевич Устрялов; November 25, 1890 – September 14, 1937) was a Russian politician, philosopher and a leader of a group known as Smenovekhovtsy. His great-uncle was Nikolay Gerasimovich Ustryalov. Ustryalov and many of his followers were later executed during the Great Purge.

== Early years ==
Ustryalov was born in Saint Petersburg. He graduated in law from Moscow University in 1913. Teaching at Moscow University, he was initially a member of the Constitutional Democratic Party. Ustryalov belonged to a tendency of Slavophile intellectuals, although from early on he departed from his contemporaries by being less enthusiastic about the Eastern Orthodox Church than the likes of Sergei Bulgakov and Peter Berngardovich Struve. He started out as a supporter of the "Whites" in the Russian Civil War and saw service under the command of Aleksandr Kolchak. However Ustryalov changed his views towards a fusion of nationalism with Bolshevism, with the new communism presented as the best hope for re-establishing Russia as an international power.

== Ideology ==
Amongst Ustryalov's written works were contributions to "The Problems of Great Russia" and "Morning of Russia", two pre-Bolshevik journals in which he called for unity amongst the Slavs and rejoiced in the overthrow of Tsarist rule. In exile he founded the journal "Okno" (Window) with other dissidents and in 1921 published his seminal collection of articles "Smena vekh" ("Change of Landmarks"), in which he expounded his theories of nationalism and that gave rise to a weekly magazine, Smena vekh. The main ideologue for the Smenovekhovtsy as his followers became known, Ustryalov used written works such as In the Struggle for Russia (1920) and Under the Sign of Revolution (1925) to argue against the views of Struve. Claiming to be inspired by figures such as General Aleksei Brusilov and Vladimir Purishkevich, both of whom had said they would serve the Bolsheviks in the interests of Russia, Ustryalov called for a reconciliation with the Soviet Union as it was only the Bolsheviks who could guarantee Russia's security. With the introduction of the New Economic Policy Ustryalov saw a process of "normalisation" beginning in the Soviet Union and argued that increasingly the USSR was "like a radish" in that it was red on the outside but white on the inside. Ustryalov did not consider himself a communist, rejecting the ideology as a foreign import, but began to use the term "National Bolshevik" after discovering it in the writings of German dissident Ernst Niekisch.

Despite his enthusiasm Ustryalov was dismissed as an enemy by Vladimir Lenin and lived in exile in Harbin, Manchuria. Here he worked as an advisor at the China Far East Railway, (KVZhD). He was Dean of the Faculty of Law at Harbin from 1920 until 1924.

== Return to the Soviet Union ==
With attitudes towards National Bolshevism having thawed under Stalin, Ustryalov was able to return to the Soviet Union in 1935. Trotsky regarded the forces that gathered around Ustryalov as not wanting Russia to return to a state of semi-colonial dependence on Western capitalism and therefore anticapitalist without being the least bit socialist. According to Trotsky, Ustryalov and his followers foresaw the conversion of the Soviet state into a normal bourgeois state, and believed that this state should be supported. Ustryalov's past as a White counted against him, however, and he struggled to find employment or even acceptance as a Soviet citizen in Moscow. Eventually he was sent to a gulag.

In 1937, during the Great Purge, he was arrested on charges of espionage and "anti-Soviet agitation". On September 14, 1937, he was sentenced to death and executed on the same day.
