= Nikolay Ustryalov (historian) =

Russian Imperial historian who elaborated the Official Nationality Theory

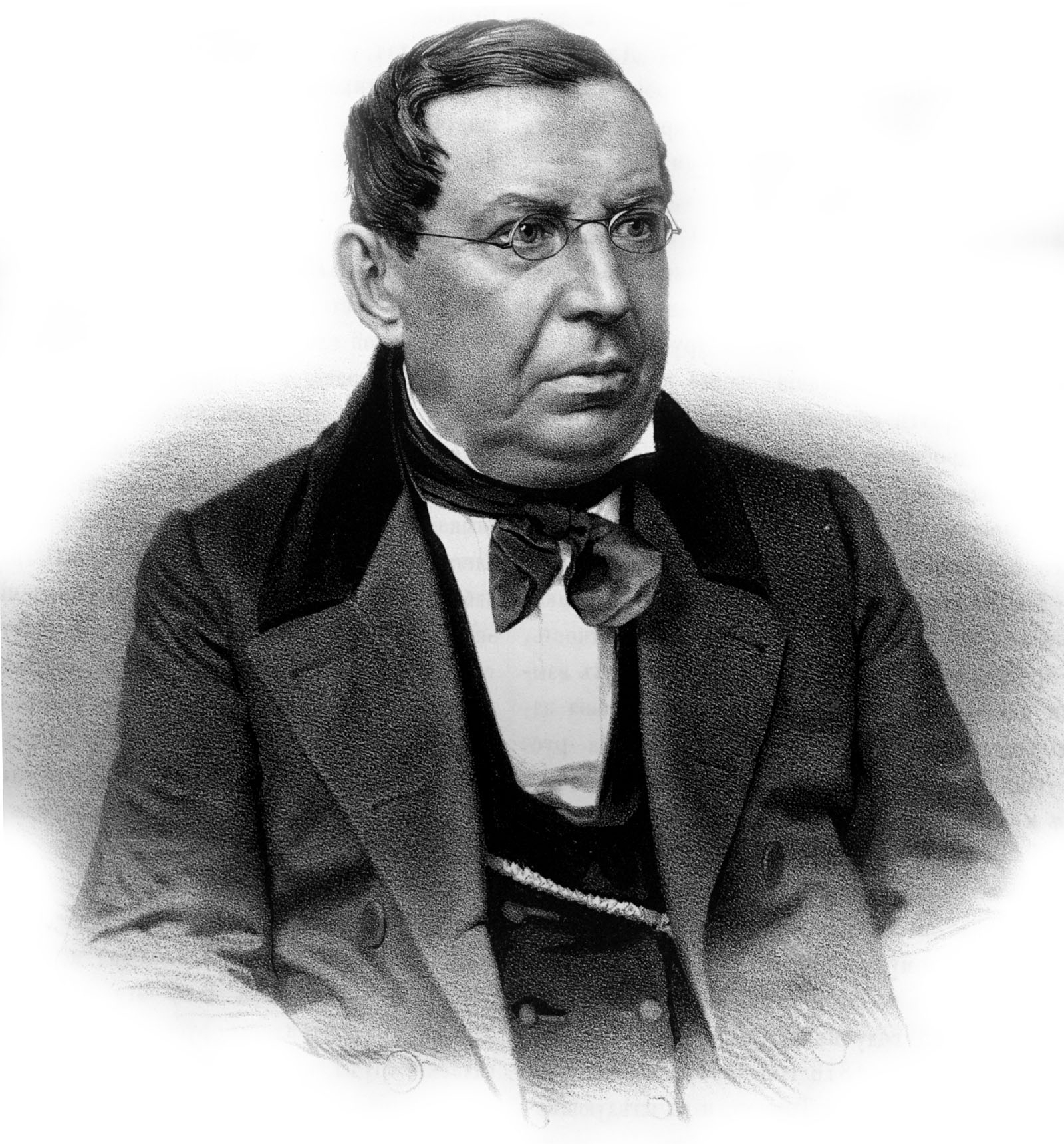
Nikolay G. Ustryalov

Nikolay Gerasimovich Ustryalov (Russian: Никола́й Гера́симович Устря́лов; 4 May (N.S. 16 May) 1805 in Bogorodickoye, Oryol Governorate, Russian Empire – 8 June (N.S. 20 June) 1870 in Tsarskoye Selo, Russian Empire) was a Russian Imperial historian who elaborated the Official Nationality Theory. His outline of Russia's history was awarded the Demidov Prize for the best Russian history textbook (1837) and was highly regarded by Nicholas I himself.

Ustryalov's father was a peasant, and his grand nephew Nikolay Vasilyevich Ustryalov was a notable politician. His major contributions to Russian historiography include the publication of several key sources on the Russian Tsardom such as Jacques Margeret's memoir (1830), the collection of reminiscences about False Demetrius I (1831), and Andrey Kurbsky's complete writings (1833).

The American Cyclopaedia (1873–1876) cites Ustryalov as the author of The History of Russia (German translation, 3 vols., Stuttgart, 1840), which "urges the gradual Russification of all the non-Russian tribes of the empire and has been officially introduced as a textbook into the Russian colleges".

Ustryalov's lectures in the University of St. Petersburg grew increasingly unpopular with students during Alexander II's liberal reign. He spent the latter part of his life working on the ten volumes of The History of Peter the Great's Reign, of which however only volumes 1-4 and 6 were completed. This work was highly regarded by his contemporaries.
