= Iron Front =

German paramilitary organization

- Eiserne Front
- Emblem of the Iron Front
- Founded: 16 December 1931
- Active regions: Germany
- Ideology: Social democracy; Democratic socialism; Anti-totalitarianism; Anti-communism; Anti-fascism; Anti-monarchism
- Political position: Centre-left to left-wing

The Iron Front (German: Eiserne Front) was a German underground paramilitary organization in the Weimar Republic that consisted of social democrats, trade unionists, and democratic socialists. Its main goal was to defend liberal democracy against totalitarian ideologies and right-wing (Note: The Iron Front was hostile not only to far-right fascist forces, but also to right-wing German conservatism in general (except Zentrum). It frequently engaged in physical altercations with right-wing paramilitary groups like Der Stahlhelm, which was associated with the national-liberal DVP and national-conservative DNVP, and viewed even moderate conservative ("centre-right" or "Bourgeois Right") organizations with deep suspicion as 'reactionary' enemies of the Republic.) and far-left politics.

The Iron Front chiefly opposed the Sturmabteilung (SA) wing of the Nazi Party and the Antifaschistische Aktion wing of the Communist Party of Germany. Formally independent, it was intimately associated with the Social Democratic Party of Germany (SPD). The Three Arrows, originally designed for the Iron Front, became a well-known social democratic symbol representing resistance against monarchism, Nazism, and communism during the parliamentary elections in November 1932. The Three Arrows were later adopted by the SPD itself.

== History ==
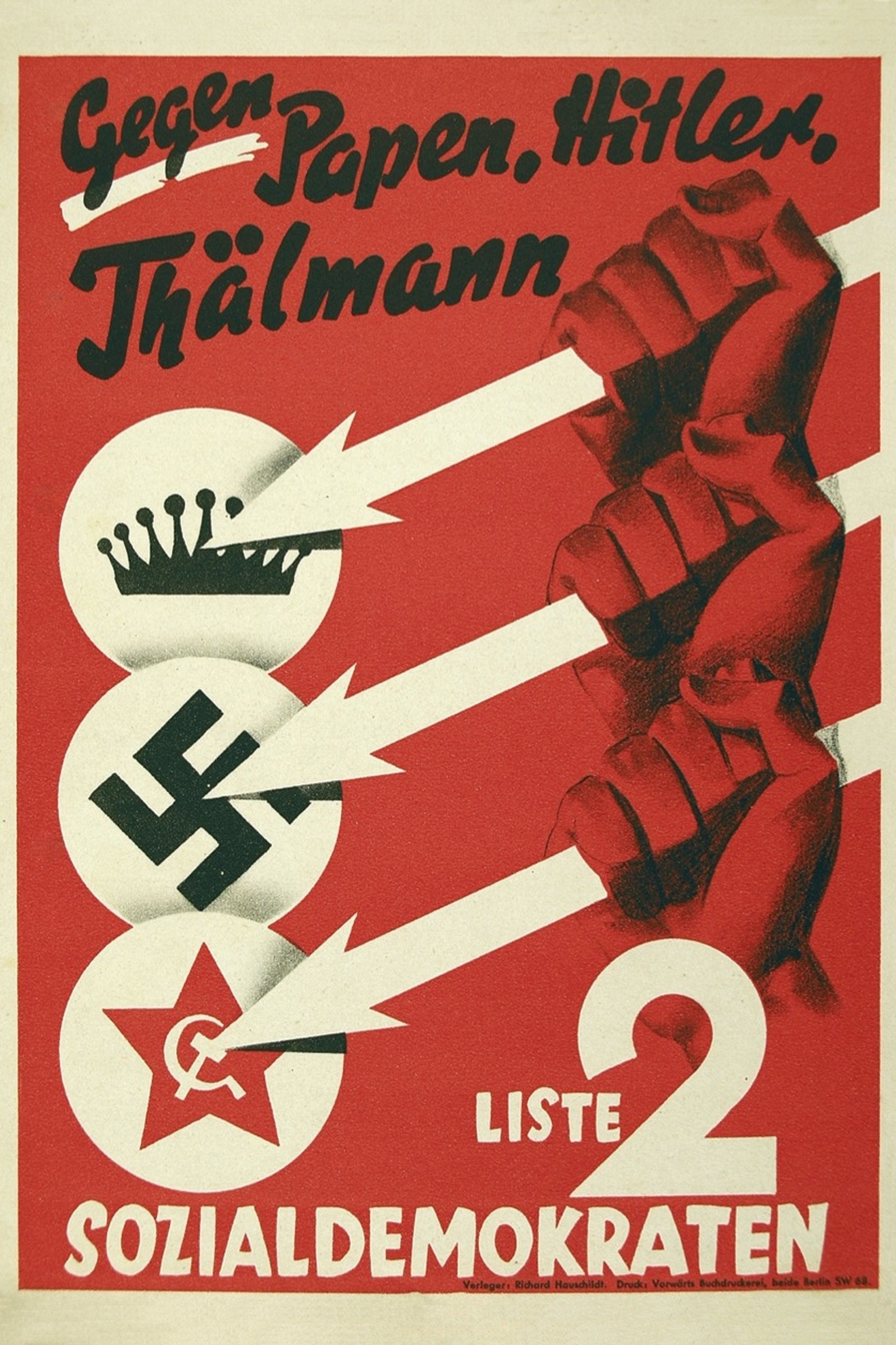
Widely publicized 1932 election poster of the Social Democratic Party of Germany, with Three Arrows symbol representing resistance against monarchism, Nazism and Communism, and with the slogan "Against Papen (monarchist candidate), Hitler (Nazi candidate), Thälmann (Communist candidate)."

The Iron Front was formed on 16 December 1931 in the Weimar Republic by the Social Democratic Party (SPD), along with the Allgemeiner Deutscher Gewerkschaftsbund (ADGB), the Allgemeiner freier Angestelltenbund (AfA-Bund), and the Reichsbanner Schwarz-Rot-Gold, and workers' sport clubs. The Iron Front was an "extraparliamentary" organisation chiefly opposed to the paramilitary organisations of both the fascist National Socialist German Workers Party (NSDAP), i.e. the Nazi Party, and the Communist Party of Germany (KPD) and established after leaders of the SPD conceded they could not abandon the streets to their enemies on the left and right. Composed of socialists, trade unionists, and republicans, its initial purpose was to defend democracy and counter the extreme-right Harzburg Front.

Following the formation of the Iron Front, SPD politician Otto Wels clarified their priorities publicly, calling for heightened vigilance, disciplined militance and promoted social democratic unity and working class solidarity. Wels presented workers as the defenders of the people's state and identified the "social rights and cultural goals of the working class" with the republic and international peace. The call was not for socialism, but for a social republic, and not for revolution, but for defence of the democratic state. The organization sought to engage the old Reichsbanner, the SPD youth organization, and labour and liberal groups, as a united front. Regarding its formation, Karl Höltermann, chairman of the Reichsbanner, commented: "1932 will be our year, the year of victory of the republic over its opponents. Not one day nor one hour more do we want to remain on the defensive. We attack! Attack on the whole line! We must be part of the general offensive. Today we call - tomorrow we strike!"

There was a positive response to the formation of the Iron Front from reenergised rank and file SPD supporters. Thousands signed up to the "Iron Book" to show their allegiance. The SPD rallied to the Iron Front, held mass demonstrations, armed themselves, and fought the Nazi SA and communist RFB in the streets. This was more than the SPD leaders wanted, but SPD workers grew increasingly militant in their resistance against the authoritarian and totalitarian movements threatening the Weimar Republic and its democratic institutions. Many of the tactics that were effectively used by the Nazis and communists were adopted by the Iron Front as their propaganda and political communication matured, and marches were held with banners, flags and music.

Its logo, the Three Arrows (pointing southwest) was designed by Russian emigre and revolutionary socialist Sergei Chakhotin, former assistant to the physiologist Ivan Pavlov in 1931. Designed so as to be able to easily cover Nazi swastikas, the meaning of the three arrows has been variously interpreted. Some say they stood for unity, activity, and discipline, whilst the present-day Reichsbanner association says the arrows of the logo stood for the SPD, the trade unions, and the Reichsbanner Schwarz-Rot-Gold, as well as for the political, economic, and physical strength of the working class. The symbol was used on a November 1932 Reichstag election poster of the SPD to represent opposition to the Nazi Party (Nazism), the Communist Party (communism), the German National People's Party (monarchism) as well as other reactionary groups.

The Iron Front was regarded as an anti-communist "social fascist terror organisation" by the KPD, which considered the SPD their main adversary. In response to the formation of the Iron Front, the KPD founded its own activist wing, Antifaschistische Aktion (Antifa), which opposed the social democrat SPD and the fascist NSDAP.

Opposition to the KPD and concerns around losing supporters to the communists meant there was no unity in the fight against Hitler and the NSDAP. Even as they prepared for the worst-case scenario of a Hitler chancellorship, the two groups refused to collaborate. Most Iron Front leadership preferred a strategy of restraint, waiting for the crisis to deepen and hoping political infighting would bring the cabinet down rather than calling for mass protests and a general strike at a time of high worker unemployment and growing KPD support. On January 30, 1933, the day Hitler was appointed chancellor, the KPD asked the Iron Front, SPD, the general trade union association ADGB and their organisations, and the Reichsbanner Schwarz-Rot-Gold to declare a general strike against Hitler. The Iron Front declined, issued a call on February 2 to "all comrades of the Reichsbanner and the Iron Front", warned against participating in "wild actions organised by irresponsible people", and exhorted members to "turn all Iron Front events into powerful rallies for freedom". Wary of communist plots and fearful of being stabbed in the back, the Iron Front preferred to put their faith in the institutions of the state and its constitution whilst awaiting the desired changes in KPD leadership that could make collaboration between the two leftist parties possible. No direct discussions between the two groups of leaders ever took place, however, as Hitler's grip on power strengthened, particularly following the Reichstag Fire of 27 February 1933.

Hitler's appointment as chancellor caused widespread agitation among social democrats across the big cities of Germany, prompting the SPD to organise rallies and campaign for the March 1933 election on "radical economic slogans with stirring calls for freedom and democratic rights" despite suffering censorship and police crackdowns from the new Nazi regime. This repression increased greatly following the Reichstag Fire, with a planned demonstration in Kassel hindered by regular police, rallies banned, and all socialist newspapers shut down. On May 2, all trade unions, with which the Iron Front was closely allied, were abolished, along with all trade union structures. Until the mid-1930s and in some cases until the war years, some local branches of the Iron Front and the former trade union organisations continued to resist, mostly by spreading leaflets, organizing secret meetings, and acts of sabotage.

== Legacy ==
The Three Arrows became a symbol of the social democratic resistance against Nazism and Soviet-style state socialism. Since roughly the 1980s, the symbol has been appropriated by American anti-fascist movements along with flags historically derived from the German Communist Party's Antifaschistische Aktion. Antifa opposed the Iron Front, whom they regarded as bourgeois and fascist, as the Three Arrows logo was used to represent resistance against Antifa's affiliated party, the KPD. The Iron Front has also become the namesake of the American Iron Front (also known as Iron Front USA), an American political activist organization that opposes the spread of authoritarianism and fascism in the United States.

The Iron Front flag has been adopted by supporters of Major League Soccer (MLS) teams including the Portland Timbers and the Seattle Sounders frequently seen at their games. MLS banned the flag in 2019 as part of a crackdown on "political symbols," although the league repealed the ban weeks later.

In June 2026, members of the SPD founded a political club of the name Eiserne Front – Demokratischer Schutzbund (Iron Front – Democratic Portection League), viewing itself as a successor to the Iron Front.

== See also ==
- Anti-Nazism
- Reichsbanner Schwarz-Rot-Gold
- Socialist Action (Poland)
- Three Arrows
- Weimar Coalition
