= War Industry Committee =

Organizations in Imperial Russia

The War Industry Committees (WIC) or Military Industrial Committees (Russian: Военно-промышленные комитеты) were set up in Imperial Russia in 1916 in order to respond to the munitions crisis particularly following a series of defeats on the Galician Front in April 1915. The first congress of the war-industries committees was held on ees 25-27 July, 1915.

Whereas there were 226 district and local committees set up by February 1916, the Central War Industry Committee had a specific role in terms of allocating money, contracts and materials on behalf of the state. The local committees developed according to the conditions from which they emerged as there was not always a strong link with the Central WIC. The Moscow WIC, for example, was quite independent of the Central WIC, and under Pavel Ryabushinsky they frequently organised contracts without going through the Central WIC. By 1917 59 committees were running factories.

== Central War Industry Committee ==
In July 1915 Alexander Guchkov, of the Progressive Bloc was elected chair of the Central Military Industrial Committee. Peter Palchinsky was deputy chair.

== See also ==
- Committee for Military-Technical Assistance
