= Reichsbanner Schwarz-Rot-Gold =

German paramilitary organization (1924–1933)

- Reichsbanner logo
- Other name: Reichsbanner
- Leaders: Otto Hörsing (1924–1931); Karl Höltermann (1931–1933)
- Founded: 22 February 1924; 102 years ago
- Dissolved: 18 February 1933; 93 years ago
- Country: Weimar Republic
- Allegiance: Social Democratic Party of Germany German Centre Party German Democratic Party
- Headquarters: Magdeburg (originally); Berlin
- Newspaper: Das Reichsbanner
- Ideology: Anti-fascism Anti-communism Liberal democracy Republicanism Majority: Social democracy Factions: Christian democracy Liberalism (German)
- Political position: Big tent; Majority: (Note: In the Weimar Republic, the SPD spanned the centre-left and left-wing; the SPD supported the anti-capitalist policy in accordance with Marxism, which is discarded with the adoption of the Godesberg Program in 1959.) Centre-left to left-wing; Factions: Centre to centre-right
- Status: Banned in 1933; Re-established in 1953 as a purely political organisation

The Reichsbanner Schwarz-Rot-Gold (German: [ˈʁaɪçsˌbanɐ ˈʃvaʁts ˈʁoːt ˈɡɔlt], lit. 'Black-Red-Gold Banner of the Reich', simply Reichsbanner in short) was an organization in Germany during the Weimar Republic with the goal to defend German parliamentary democracy against internal subversion and extremism from the left and right and to compel the population to respect and honour the new Republic's flag and constitution. It was formed by members of the centre-left to left-wing Social Democratic Party of Germany (SPD), the centre to centre-right German Centre Party, and the centre to centre-left German Democratic Party in February 1924. However, the Reichsbanner's position strongly leaned towards the SPD, and was the main antagonist of the right-wing Der Stahlhelm.

Organized militarily, the members wanted to ensure non-violent protection from the enemies of democracy. They refused to arm themselves, but were partly made up of veterans.

Its name is derived from the Flag of Germany adopted in 1919, the colours of which were associated with the Weimar Republic and liberal German nationalism, and, as it happens, the traditional party colours of its three founding parties: the Centre Party (black), the Social Democratic Party (red), and the Democratic Party (gold).

While the Reichsbanner was set up as a multiparty organization, it came to be strongly associated with the Social Democratic Party. The headquarters of the Reichsbanner was located in Magdeburg, but it had branches elsewhere.

As a pro-democracy paramilitary organization, Reichsbanner's main opponents were the Communist Party of Germany and their Rotfrontkämpferbund on the far-left, and the Nazi Party and their Sturmabteilung (SA) on the far-right. Alongside these two primary opponents, they also combatted various reactionary nationalist paramilitary organizations. Following the Nazi takeover, the Reichsbanner was banned in March 1933. Some members then played a role in the anti-Nazi resistance.

The Reichsbanner was reestablished in 1953, as Reichsbanner Schwarz-Rot-Gold, Bund aktiver Demokraten e.V. as an association for political education. The postwar club is no longer a paramilitary organization but organizes remembrance and educational activities such as seminars and panels. Congruent with its historical makeup, it is officially open for members of all democratic parties but is closely associated with the SPD. It has connections with the Memorial to the German Resistance, the armed forces, and the police.

== History ==
=== Formation and early developments (1924–1930) ===
At the time of Reichsbanner's formation, armed groups like the nationalist Der Stahlhelm, the Nazi Sturmabteilung, and the Communist Roter Frontkämpferbund continued to radicalize and intensify the armed struggle in Germany. The Reichsbanner was initially formed in reaction to the Nazis' Beer Hall Putsch and Communists' Hamburg rebellion, both failed coups, which had taken place at the end of 1923. A number of atomised left-wing republican defensive leagues had emerged throughout the country. Social Democratic leaders, most notably Otto Hörsing sought to consolidate these groups into a paramilitary organisation uniting supporters of the Republic. Thus on 22 February 1924 members of the SPD, the German Centre Party, the German Democratic Party and trade unionists in Magdeburg established the Reichsbanner. While the Reichsbanner was intended to include all elements within Germany that favoured the Republic, Social Democrats comprised roughly 90 percent of its membership.

In the fall of 1927, the Reichsbanner expelled all members belonging to the Old Social Democratic Party, accusing the party of seeking alliances with the Fascists.

Reichsbanner was a veterans' organization, in which former soldiers of the First World War enlisted their military experience in the service of the Republic. Its main goal was the defense of the Weimar Republic against usurpations of democracy from the National Socialist, Monarchist, and Communist camps. Social Democratic politician Otto Hörsing described Reichsbanner as a 'non-partisan protection organization of the Republic and democracy in the fight against the Swastika and the Soviet star'. Members saw themselves as guardians of the continuation of Germany's democratic traditions such as the Revolutions of 1848 and their namesake constitutional national colors of black, red and gold.

=== End of Weimar democracy (1930–1933) ===
Following substantial Nazi electoral successes in 1930, the Reichsbanner in September sought to strengthen itself against intensified street violence by Sturmabteilung units with a restructuring of the operational organization. Active members were divided into master formations (Stafo) and the elite units into protection formations (Schufo). In spring 1931, 250,000 men belonged to the Schufos. The "Young Banners" were also formed.

On 16 December 1931, the Reichsbanner, the Workers' Gymnastic and Sporting Federation (ATSB), the General German Trade Union Federation (ADGB), and the Social Democratic Party formed the Iron Front. Within the Front, defensive operations were the responsibility of the Reichsbanner, which became increasingly important as violence from the Communist Rotfrontkämpferbund and Nazi Sturmabteilung increased drastically.

The last federal general assembly of the Reichsbanner met on the 17th and 18 February 1933 in Berlin. In March, Reichsbanner and the Iron Front were banned throughout the Reich.

Following the banning of the Reichsbanner, some members joined Der Stahlhelm, which led to an incident where a mass registration in Braunschweig was raided by the Nazis, who called it the Stahlhelm Putsch.

=== Reichsbanner members in the Resistance (1933–1945) ===
Following its ban, some of the organization's membership, in particular the elite Schufos, took part in the Social Democratic Resistance. Resistance circles of former Reichsbanner members formed around individuals like Theodor Haubach.

=== Reichsbanner in post-Nazi Germany ===
The Reichsbanner was re-formed in 1953 as an association for political and historical education, as of November 2025 it contained roughly 1,200 members.

After its reestablishment, the Reichsbanner continued its historical practice of publishing magazines. In its modern form, the publication informs members and the public of current social issues and often contains interviews with high-ranking German politicians.

The Reichsbanner stopped wearing uniforms after the War, as uniforms are a symbol of the state monopoly on the use of force, which the modern Reichsbanner respects.

Today some German top politicians are honorary Reichsbanner members, including defense minister Boris Pistorius, ex-chancellors Gerhard Schröder, Helmut Schmid and many more.

== Historical structure and organisation ==
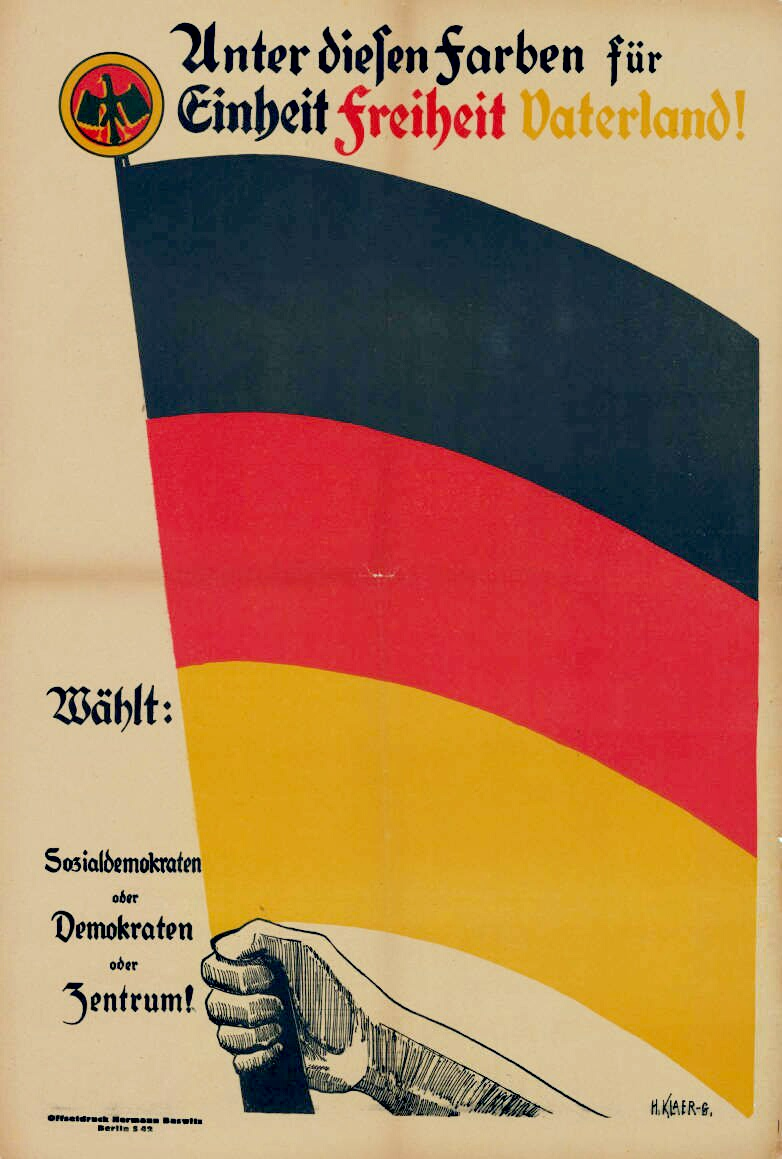
Weimar Coalition poster from the December 1924 German federal election

In the original Reichsbanner, two organizational structures existed in parallel: a registered political association and an organized fighting force.

The political organization was headed by the Federal Administration comprising a first and second chairman, three deputies, the federal treasurer, federal cashier, secretary, technical manager, federal youth leader, the sitting representatives and 15 assessors. The Federal Chairman was Otto Hörsing from the 3rd of June 1932. His deputy and later successor was Karl Höltermann. The executive committees of all organizational levels were elected from the membership of the all republican parties in the coalition.

Parallel to it, the operational organization was modeled as a military structure. The smallest unit was the group, with a group leader and eight men. Two to five groups formed a platoon (Zug), two to three platoons formed a company (Kameradschaft), two to five companies constituted a department (Abteilung), and two to five departments made up a district. At least two districts formed a circle. At the Gau and Federal levels, operational and political level structures overlapped so that the Federal Chairman was concurrently the Federal Commander, while each of the Gau chairmen were all Gauführer. The command personnel of the military organisation were recognized by badges of rank. The Federal Commander, for example, wore on his lower sleeve the federal eagle (black on a red field, with golden circular border) and two black-red-golden stripes over all.

As of 1st of July 1924, the Reichsbanner had 29 Gaue: Ostpreußen, Pommern, Brandenburg-Berlin, Niederschlesien, Oberschlesien, Halle-Saale, Magdeburg-Anhalt, Mecklenburg-Lübeck, Schleswig-Holstein, Hamburg-Bremen-Nordhannover, Braunschweig, Groß-Thüringen, Leipzig, Obersachsen, Chemnitz, Zwickau, Hessen-Kassel, Hessen-Nassau, Östliches Westfalen, Oldenburg-Ostfriesland-Osnabrück, Westliches Westfalen, Niederrhein, Obere Rheinprovinz, Hessen, Baden, Württemberg-Hohenzollern, Franken, Oberpfalz und Niederbayern, Oberbayern-Schwaben.

According to the organization's own records, membership in 1932 was gauged at three million.

== Gallery ==
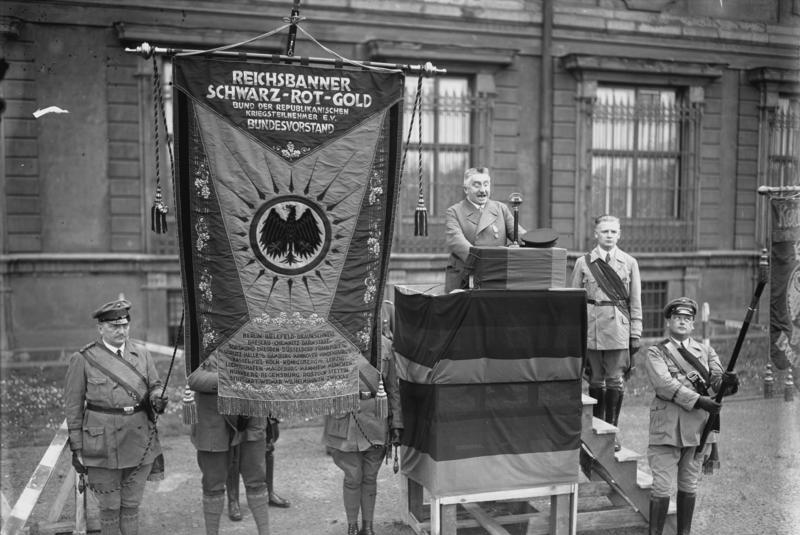
Meeting in 1929

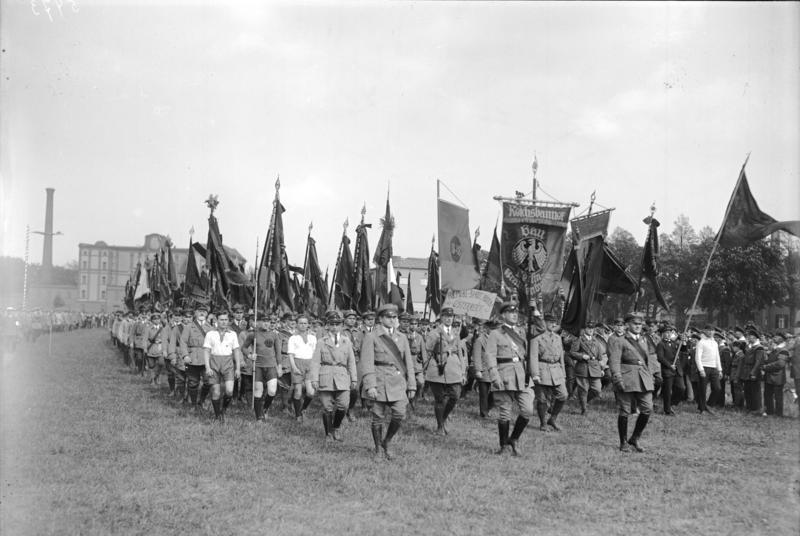
Reichsbanner marching, 1928

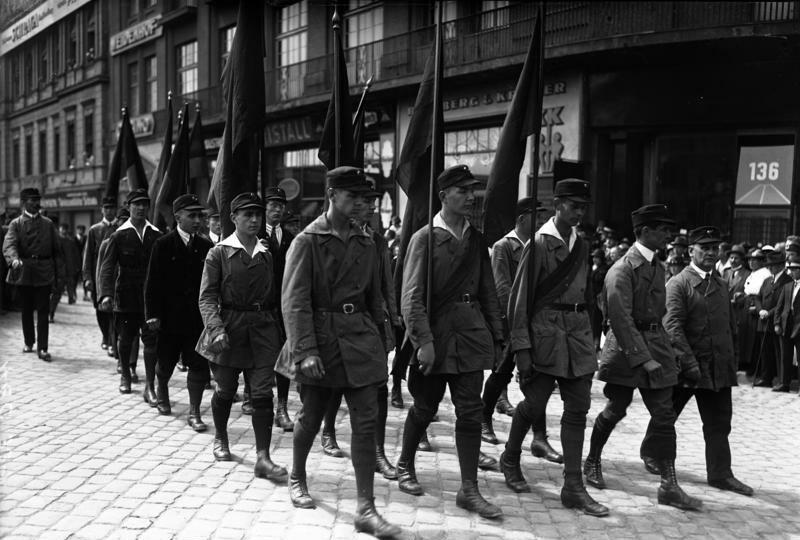
Reichsbanner marching 1930

== See also ==
- Weimar paramilitary groups
- Iron Front
- Republikanischer Schutzbund
- Arbeiter-Schutzbund

== Bibliography ==
- Günther Gerstenberg: Freiheit! Sozialdemokratischer Selbstschutz im München der zwanziger und frühen dreißiger Jahre., 2 volumes; Andechs 1997; ISBN 3-928359-03-7
- Helga Gotschlich: Zwischen Kampf und Kapitulation. Zur Geschichte des Reichsbanners Schwarz-Rot-Gold.; Dietz, Berlin (Est), 1987; ISBN 3-320-00785-8
- David Magnus Mintert: "Sturmtrupp der Deutschen Republik". Das Reichsbanner Schwarz-Rot-Gold im Wuppertal (= Verfolgung und Widerstand in Wuppertal, vol. 6; Grafenau 2002; ISBN 3-9808498-2-1
- Karl Rohe: Das Reichsbanner Schwarz Rot Gold. Ein Beitrag zur Geschichte und Struktur der politischen Kampfverbände zur Zeit der Weimarer Republik. Droste, Düsseldorf 1966.
- Pamela E. Swett: Neighbors and Enemies: The Culture of Radicalism in Berlin, 1929–1933. Cambridge, England: Cambridge University Press, 2004; ISBN 0-521-83461-9
- Carsten Voigt: Kampfbünde der Arbeiterbewegung. Das Reichsbanner Schwarz-Rot-Gold und der Rote Frontkämpferbund in Sachsen 1924–1933 (= Geschichte und Politik in Sachsen, Bd. 26). Böhlau, Köln/Weimar/Wien 2009; ISBN 3-412-20449-8
