= Flag of Nazi Germany =

National flag of Germany (1935–1945)

Reich and National Flag of Nazi Germany (1935–1945) Reichs- und Nationalflagge
- Use: National flag and ensign
- Proportion: 3∶5
- Adopted: 15 September 1935
- Relinquished: 23 May 1945
- Design: A flag featuring a red background with a black swastika on a white disc
- Designed by: Adolf Hitler
- Flag of Nazi Germany (1933–1935)
- Use: National flag and ensign
- Proportion: 3∶5
- Adopted: 14 March 1933
- Relinquished: 15 September 1935
- Design: A horizontal tricolour of black, white, and red.

The flag of Nazi Germany, officially called the Reich and National Flag (German: Reichs- und Nationalflagge), and also known as the Nazi flag or swastika flag (German: Hakenkreuzflagge), featured a red background with a black swastika in a white circle. This flag came into use initially as the banner of the National-Socialist German Workers' Party (NSDAP), commonly known as the Nazi Party, after its foundation in 1920. Shortly after the appointment of Adolf Hitler as Chancellor in 1933, this flag was adopted as mandatory for use, while the national one was the black-white-red triband of the German Empire. One year after the death of President Paul von Hindenburg, this arrangement ended. The Nazis banned usage of the imperial tricolour, labelling it as "reactionary", and made their party flag the national flag of Germany as a part of the Nuremberg Laws in 1935, which it remained until the end of World War II and the fall of the Third Reich.

== History ==
=== Origins ===
The design of the Nazi flag was introduced by Hitler as the party flag in mid-1920, roughly a year before (29 July 1921) he became his political party's leader: a flag with a red background, a white circle and a black swastika in the middle. The flag was designed by Hitler himself, as described in his book Mein Kampf, in which he explained the process by which the Nazi flag design was created, after having presented several proposals:

"I myself, meanwhile, after innumerable attempts, had laid down a final form; a flag with a red background, a white disk, and a black swastika in the middle. After long trials I also found a definite proportion between the size of the flag and the size of the white disk, as well as the shape and thickness of the swastika.

— Adolf Hitler, Mein Kampf (1925)

The Nazi Party was not the only party to use the swastika in Germany. After World War I, a number of far-right nationalist movements adopted the swastika. As a symbol, it became associated with the idea of a racially "pure" state.

=== Mandatory party flag (1933–1935) ===
Soon after Hitler was appointed Chancellor of Germany on 30 January 1933, the black-red-gold tricolour flag of the Weimar Republic was banned; a ruling on 12 March established two legal flags: the reintroduced black-white-red imperial tricolour national flag and the flag of the Nazi Party. Despite this, the new flags were not introduced officially until 14 March 1933, although this usage may have formally started earlier. On 29 April 1933, Interior Minister Wilhelm Frick decreed that all merchant ships had to fly the black-white-red ensign at the stern and the flag of the Nazi Party on the signal stay or starboard signal yard.

First national flag of Nazi Germany (1933–1935), corresponding the flag of the North German Confederation (1867–1871) and the German Empire (1871–1919).

The flag of the Nazi Party (1920–1945). On this flag, the swastika is centred, making it slightly different from the national flag used after 1935, on which the swastika is off-centred.

Initially, the official specification for the Nazi flag placed the white disk, containing the swastika, in the middle of the flag. However, on 20 December 1933 a decree was issued authorising an off-centred version of the swastika flag for use at sea. This was purely a practical decision intended to make the emblem more visible (because when a flag is flying briskly, the outer half appears shorter than the half next to the staff and the centred white circle would appear to be more towards the fly). Moreover, although the Nazi flag on land had the swastika on both sides "right-facing," the Nazi flag at sea displayed the swastika on the reverse side as a "through and through" or mirror image, so the flag had a "right-facing" swastika on the front (or obverse) side and a "left-facing" swastika on the back (or reverse) side. It is not absolutely known when the reverse of the swastika flag at sea was changed, but it can be assumed that this change was made as part of the regulations of 20 December 1933. The reasons were the same in each case: to improve the appearance ("optical proportions") of the flag when used at sea, and improve the visibility of the important design elements (by eliminating potential reverse-shadowing of the dark swastika on the white circle, especially in bright sun light). The German Government's publication Die Flaggen des deutschen Reiches (1934 edition) illustrates both versions of the swastika flag, referring to the centred version plainly as the Swastika Flag (German: Hakenkreuzflagge) and the off-centred version as the Swastika Flag on Merchant Ships (German: Hakenkreuzflagge auf Kauffahrteischiffen).

=== National flag and ensign (1935–1945) ===
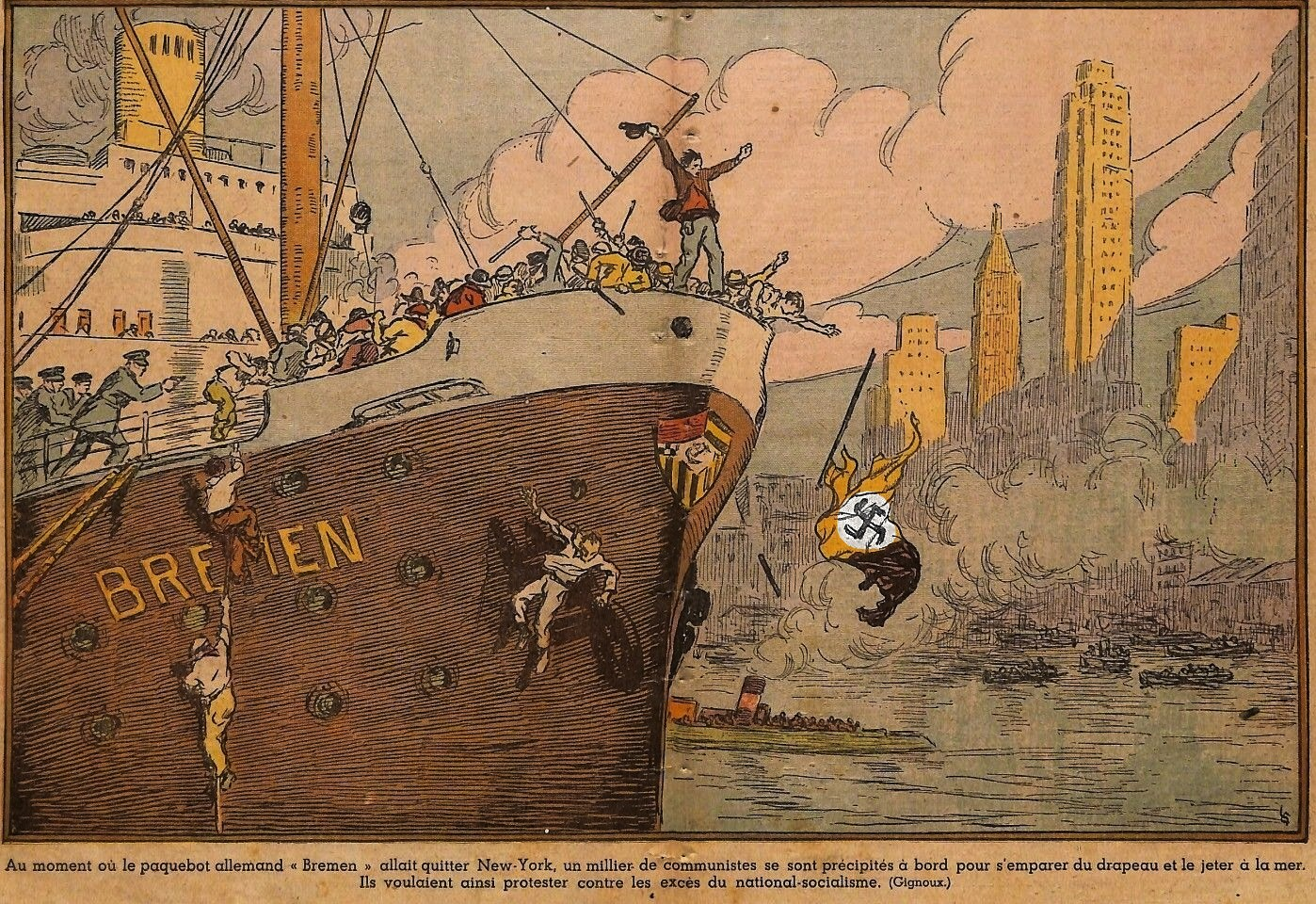
Illustration depicting anti-Nazi demonstrators attacking Bremen docked in New York Harbor, United States on 26 July 1935

On 15 September 1935, one year after the death of Reich President Paul von Hindenburg, the Nazi flag became the national flag and ensign of Germany. One reason for the change may have been the "Bremen incident" of 26 July 1935, in which a group of demonstrators in New York City boarded the ocean liner SS Bremen, tore the Nazi Party flag from the jackstaff, and tossed it into the Hudson River. When the German ambassador protested, US officials responded that the swastika was not the German national flag (unlike the black-white-red tricolour) and therefore the perpetrators could not be criminally prosecuted and punished due to the absence of elements of crime, as the German national flag had not been harmed, but only a political party symbol. The new flag law, which had been issued as a part of the Nuremberg Laws, was announced at the annual party rally in Nuremberg in 1935, where Hermann Göring claimed the old black-white-red flag, while honoured, was the symbol of a bygone era and under threat of being used by "reactionaries". Until 15 September 1935, the use of the swastika flag was authorised in the centred version, providing for the off-centred version for use at sea only, but on 15 September 1935, the Swastika Flag and the Swastika Flag on Merchant Ships – elevated to the rank of the national flag and the civil ensign, respectively – were unified and were henceforth identical except for their reverse side – the regulations demanded the disk and swastika be "slightly" set off from the centre towards the flag pole. There was therefore some confusion after the war about this arrangement. Allied soldiers deemed the centred disk versions of the swastika flag to be "national flags", so a lot of publications later maintained, mistakenly, that the centred disk version was used until the end of World War II. In fact, the only centred disk versions of the flag used after 1935 were the party flags of the Nazi Party.

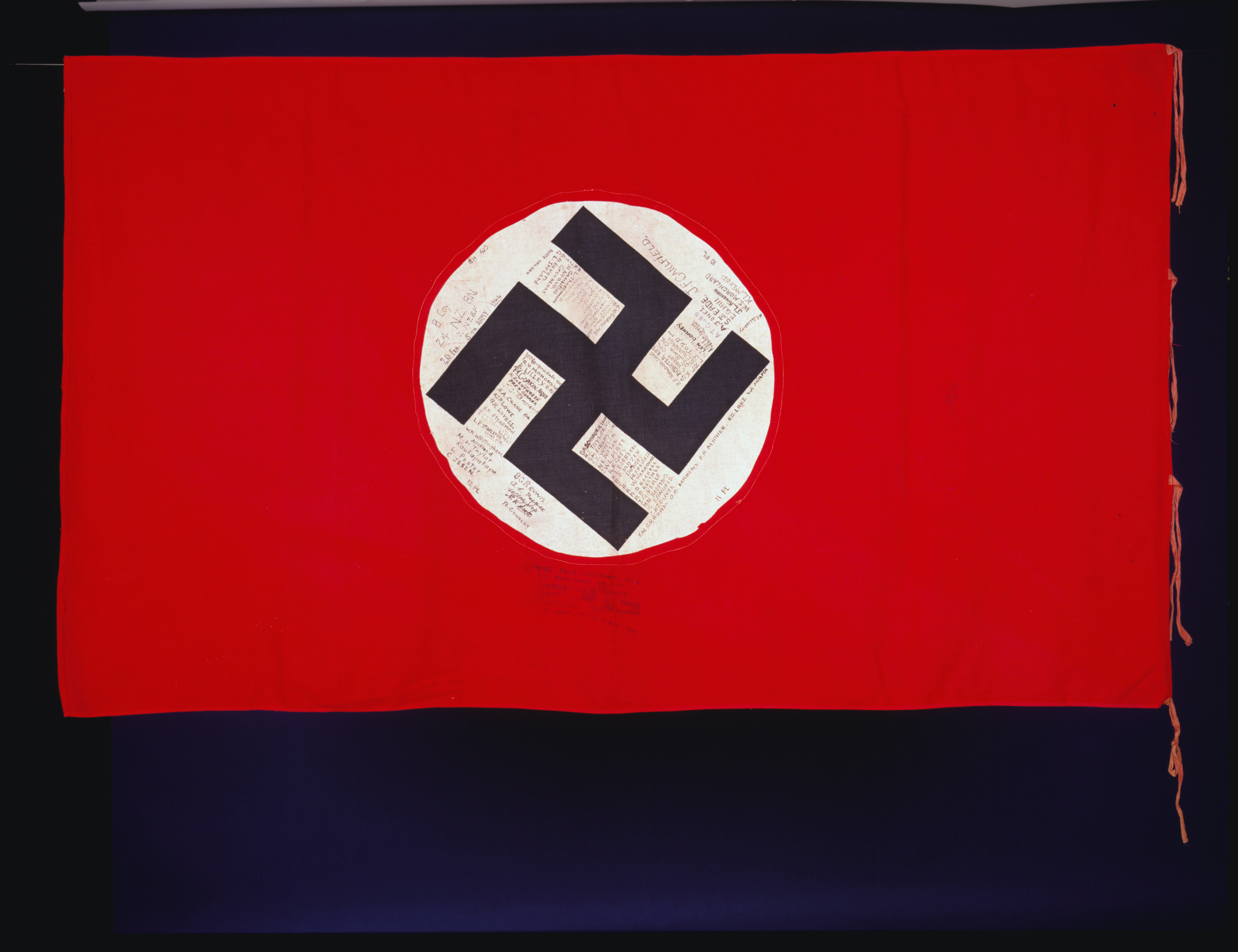
A flag from Nazi Germany found near the south bank of the Rapido River about 1,200 m (4,000 feet) west of Monte Cassino by J. McQuorkindale on the night of 17–18 February 1944. The swastika appears to be left-facing in this image.

== Symbolism ==
The Nazi flag takes its colours from the imperial tricolour, with Hitler writing that he "was always for keeping the old colours", because he saw them as his "most sacred possession" as a soldier, and also because they suited his personal taste. Hitler added new symbolism to the colours, stating that "[t]he red expressed the social thought underlying the movement. White the national thought", and that the black swastika was an emblem of the "Aryan race" and "the ideal of creative work which is in itself and always will be anti-Semitic."

== Legal status and usage since 1945 ==
At the end of World War II, after the defeat of Nazi Germany, the first law enacted by the Allied Control Council on 20 September 1945 abolished all symbols and repealed all relevant laws of the Third Reich. The possession, importation or display of swastika flags has been forbidden in several countries since then, particularly in Germany.

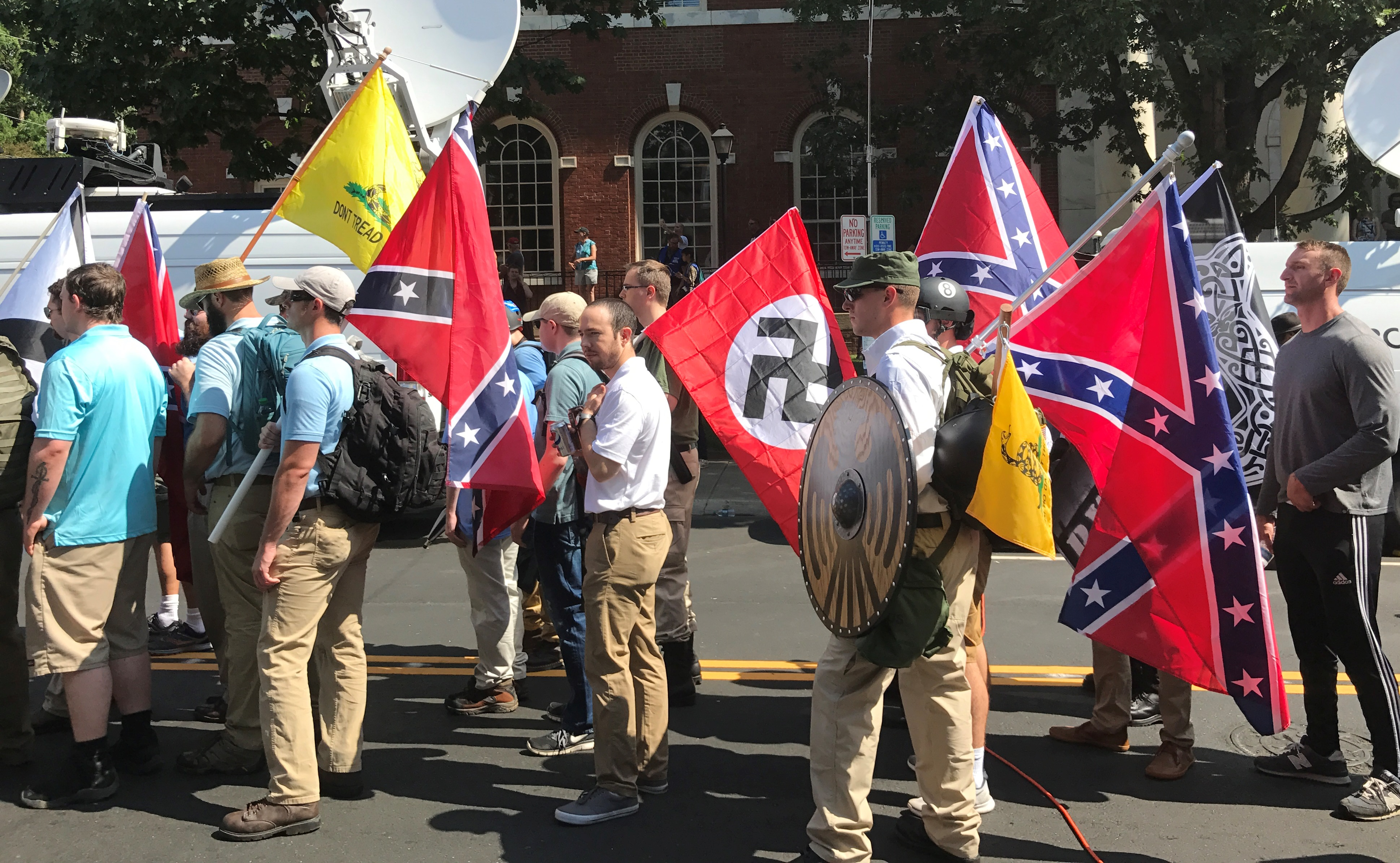
Prominent alt-right activists were instrumental in organising the "Unite the Right" rally in Charlottesville, Virginia, United States in August 2017. Here, rally participants carry Confederate battle flags, Gadsden flags, a Nazi flag and a flag depicting Mjölnir.

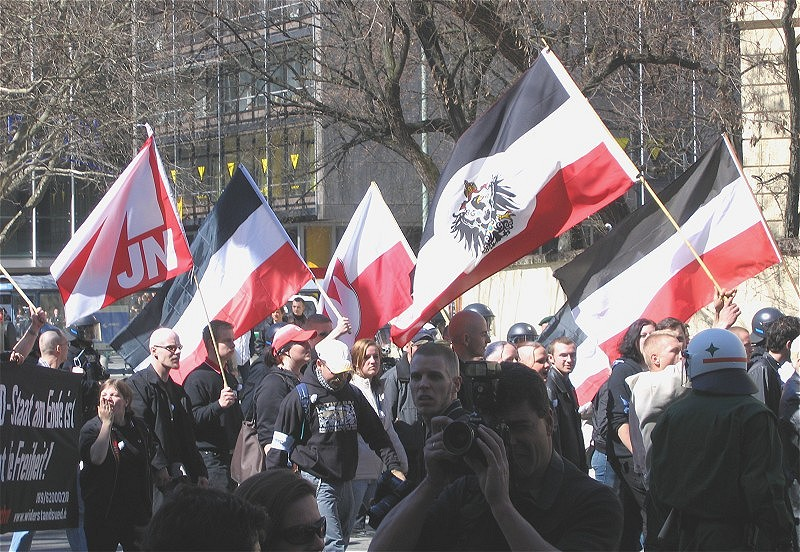
Participants of a nationalist march in Munich (2005) flying the Reichsflagge and Reichsdienstflagge of 1933–1935 (de). Even though the historical Nazis outlawed this flag in 1935 because of its "reactionary nature", the neo-Nazis in modern Germany resort to use it as a symbol, due to a ban on swastika flag usage (§ 86a StGB).

Today, the Nazi swastika flag remains in common use by neo-Nazi supporters and sympathisers outside Germany, whilst in Germany neo-Nazis use the homeland's flag of 1933–1935 instead, since the above-mentioned ban on all Nazi symbolism (e.g. the swastika, the Schutzstaffel's (SS) double sig rune, etc.) is still in effect within today's Germany according to section § 86a of the German Strafgesetzbuch. However, the imperial black-white-red flag originally did not have any racist or antisemitic meaning, despite its brief use in Nazi Germany.

== See also ==
- Colours, standards and guidons
- Flag of Germany
- List of flags of the German Navy (1935–1945)
- List of flags of the Luftwaffe (1933–1945)
- List of flags of the Wehrmacht and Heer (1933–1945)
- List of German flags
- List of German standards at the Moscow Victory Parade of 1945
- Personal standard of Adolf Hitler
- Reichskriegsflagge
