= List of flags of the Wehrmacht and Heer (1933–1945) =

This is a list of flags of the German Wehrmacht and Heer which were used in the years between 1933 and 1945 by the Reichswehr, Wehrmacht, and Heer.

== Supreme command flags of the Reichswehr and Wehrmacht ==
Flag	Dates	Designation	Description
	1933–1935	Command flag for the Reichswehr minister	The flag was introduced on 14 March 1933 and was used until 23 July 1935. The position of Reichswehr Minister and Commander-in-Chief of the Wehrmacht was held since 30 January 1933 by Werner von Blomberg.
	1935	Command flag for the Reichskriegsminister and Commander-in-Chief of the Wehrmacht	Adopted on 23 July 1935 and used until 5 October 1935. The name was changed to Reich Ministry of War on 21 May 1935.
	1935–1938	Command flag for the Reichskriegsminister and Commander-in-Chief of the Wehrmacht	Adopted on 5 October 1935 and used until 4 February 1938. Following Blomberg's dismissal in February 1938, Adolf Hitler himself assumed the position of Commander-in-Chief of the Wehrmacht. The command flag was therefore no longer used and replaced by the following:
	1938–1945	Personal standard of Adolf Hitler as Commander-in-Chief of the Wehrmacht	Adolf Hitler's personal standard, adopted on 11 April 1935, and was also used to represent the Commander-in-Chief of the Wehrmacht after Blomberg's dismissal. Since 19 December 1941, it also served as the command flag for the commander-in-chief of the army, following Hitler's takeover of the position.
	1938–1941	Command flag for the Chief of the Armed Forces High Command	With the direct assumption of command over the Wehrmacht by Hitler, the Reich Ministry of War was dissolved and replaced by a newly created Oberkommando der Wehrmacht (OKW). Its chief was from the beginning until the end of the war, Wilhelm Keitel. The flag was adopted on 6 August 1938 and used exclusively on motor vehicles. It had the same dimensions as below.
	1941–1945	Command flag for the Chief of the Armed Forces High Command	Introduced 7 April 1941, following Keitel's promotion to field marshal on 19 July 1940. The flag was also used only on motor vehicles. It had a length-to-height ratio of 5 to 3. In practice it was 30 cm high, 45 cm long and had a 15 cm deep incision. In the white central circle were two crossed field marshals, on which an imperial eagle had been placed. This sat on a wreath, which included an upright swastika.

== Supreme command flags of occupied territories ==
Flag	Dates	Designation	Description
	1940–1945	Commander flag for a Militärbefehlshaber	A Militärbefehlshaber was the head of all civilian facilities in an occupied territory (police, administration, etc.) and a member of the Wehrmacht. The flag was square in shape, but did not have a well-defined size.
	1940–1945	Commander flag for a Wehrmachtbefehlshaber	A Wehrmachtbefehlshaber was the head of all military units in an occupied territory that was not under military administration. The flag was square in shape, but did not have a well-defined size.

== Supreme command flags of the Heer ==
Flag	Dates	Designation	Description
	1933–1935	Flag for the Supreme Commander of the Army	Used between February 1934 and June 1935 with the designation Flag of the Chief of the Army Command. The position of Commander-in-Chief of the Army was held from 1932 to 1938 by Werner von Fritsch.
	1935–1941	Flag for the Supreme Commander of the Army	In 1938, Walther von Brauchitsch took over command. When Adolf Hitler made himself Commander-in-Chief of the Army, in 19 December 1941. The flag was thus no longer used, and was replaced by the Hitler's personal standard (see above).
	1944–1945	Flag for the Chief of the OKH General Staffs	The flag was introduced on 1 September 1944 and used until shortly before the end of the war. Since the position of Chief of the Army General Staff was Heinz Guderian during this period, the flag was mainly associated with him.
	1941–1945	Vehicle pennant for a Generalfeldmarschall of the Heer	The flag was introduced on 23 April 1941. It was square and had a length of 30 cm (1 ft).
	1941–1945	Vehicle pennant for generals of the Heer	The pennant was introduced on 23 April 1941; it was 35 cm × 23 cm (14 in × 9 in) in size.
	1941–1945	Vehicle pennant for other members of the Heer	The pennant was introduced on 23 April 1941; it was 30 cm × 20 cm (12 in × 8 in) in size.
	1941–1945	Command flag for the commander-in-chief of an army group	Note that the red border is thin, unlike the flag for the commander-in-chief of an Armeeoberkommando.
	1933–1945	Command flag for the commander-in-chief of an Armeeoberkommando	Until 1941, called the "flag for the staff of an army commando." Note that the red border is thick, unlike the flag for the commander-in-chief of an army group.
	1941–1945	Command flag for the commander of a Panzergruppe (armoured group)	
	1933–1945	Command flag for the commanding general of an army corps	Until 1941, called the "flag for the staff of a general command"
	1933–1945	Command flag for the commander of a division	Until 1941, called the "flag for the staff of a division"

== See also ==
- List of German standards at the Moscow Victory Parade of 1945
- List of flags of the German Navy (1935–1945)
- List of flags of the Luftwaffe (1933–1945)

== Literature ==
- Davis, Brian Leigh (1984). Flags & standards of the Third Reich: Army, navy, & air force, 1933-1945. Arco Pub. ISBN 978-0668036207.
- Oberkommando der Kriegsmarine (1992). Das große Flaggenbuch (in German). Mauritius Buch Verlag. ISBN 978-3980334204.
