= List of flags of the German Navy (1935–1945) =

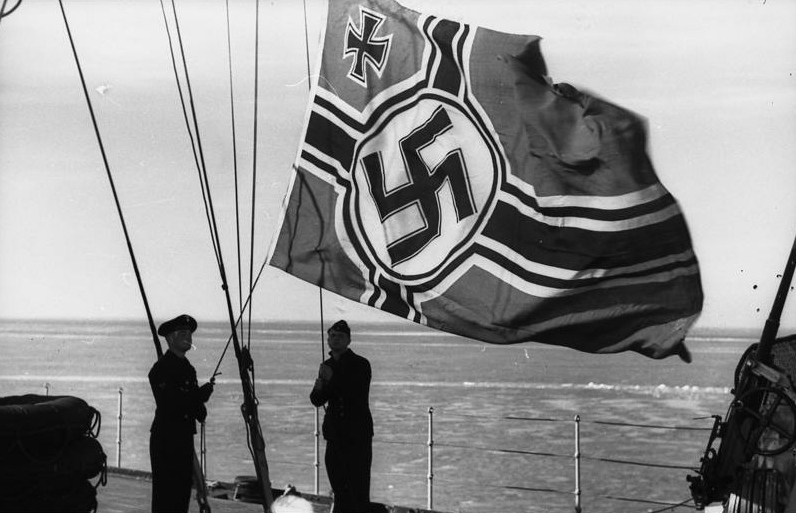
Reichskriegsflagge on a ship

This is a list of flags of the German Navy, which includes flags, standards, and pennants that used in the years between 1935 and 1945 by the German Kriegsmarine and merchant navy.

== National and merchant flag ==
Flag	Date	Designation	Description
	1935–1945	National and merchant flag, and marine jack	The width ratios of red area: circular disk: red area behaved as 9: 18: 13. At sea was used since 1933 exclusively and prescribed the version with the inwardly offset swastika.

== Merchant flag with the Iron Cross ==
Flag	Date	Designation	Description
	1935–1945	Merchant flag with the Iron Cross	Used by merchant navy captains who were retired navy officers (reserve officers)

== Reichskriegsflagge ==
The Reichskriegsflagge, which was introduced on 7 November 1935, was widely used in the Wehrmacht. Thus, it also served the Kriegsmarine as the naval ensign, which was hoisted on flag days regardless of the location of the ship. These were 1 January (New Year), 18 January (founding day of the German Empire in 1871), 30 January ("Day of National Survey"), 20 April (Adolf Hitler's birthday), 1 May ("Labour Day") and 31 May (anniversary of the Battle of Jutland in World War I). In addition, ships in home waters had to hoist the Reichskriegsflagge on 1 March (commemorating the 1935 reintegration of the Territory of the Saar Basin into Germany), 29 August (the day of the founding of the Prussian Navy in 1859), the first Sunday after Michaelmas and the day of the harvest festival. Regardless of these days, all warships that received a head of state were obliged to show the Reichskriegsflagge.

Flag	Date	Designation	Description
	1935–1937	Reichskriegsflagge	Introduced on 7 November 1935
	1938–1945	Reichskriegsflagge	The width and the course of the black stripes were changed compared to the previous version. This change was likely made in December 1937, but there are no official publications about it.

== Reich service flag ==
The Reich service flag was used by all state authorities, such as the Reichsbahn, Reichsautobahn, and Reichsbank. In the navy, the Reich service flag was carried by all state-owned vessels that were not allowed to hoist the Reichskriegsflagge. In the case of the absence of the Reich service flag, the national and merchant flag had to be flown in its place.

Flag	Date	Designation	Description
	1935–1945	Reich service flag	The flag had the proportions of 3:5. There was an upstanding swastika in the centre, on a white circle with a black border. A Reichsadler is placed in the upper hoist.

== Flags of the Kriegsmarine ==
Most command and rank flags of the German Navy had traditional character and were already used in the Imperial and before that the Prussian Navy. The flag of a grand admiral was very similar to the version used in the Imperial Navy. Completely new, however, was the rank of general admiral, which Erich Raeder, the Commander-in-Chief of the Kriegsmarine, adopted in 1936. In order to avoid Raeder having a higher rank than the Commander-in-Chief of the Luftwaffe (Colonel General Hermann Göring) and the Army (Generaloberst Werner von Fritsch), the rank of general admiral was introduced. The actual intended rank of a grand admiral as Commander-in-Chief of the Navy was "postponed" and a special flag introduced for a commander-in-chief who was not grand admiral. Raeder was promoted to grand admiral in 1939, meaning the special flag was still official, but found no use. This continued with the successor of Raeder, Karl Dönitz, who in 1943, was promoted from the rank of admiral to grand admiral, skipping general admiral.

=== Higher command rank flags ===
Flag	Date	Designation	Description
	1935–1945 (de facto until 1939)	Flag of the Commander-in-Chief of the Navy, if not a grand admiral	Two crossed admiral swords on which the admiral cross is placed
	1939–1945	Grand admiral's flag	Arranged on an admiral cross two crossed Großadmiral batons and the Wehrmacht eagle in yellow. Striking is the "shading technique" used in this flag. Both the grand admiral staff and the Wehrmacht eagle were equipped with shadow elements.
	1943–1945	Flag of the Inspector Admiral of the Navy of the Greater German Reich with the rank of grand admiral	Flag of a grand admiral with a wide light blue border which was one fifth of the width of the inner flag. The position of Admiral Inspector was held by Erich Raeder.
	1935–1945	General admiral's flag	An admiral cross with two crossed swords in yellow and brown in the lower hoist
	1935–1945	Admiral's flag	The admiral cross was already introduced in the Prussian Navy.
	1935–1945	Vice admiral's flag	An admiral cross with a black ball in the upper hoist
	1935–1945	Rear admiral's flag	An admiral cross with black balls in the upper and lower hoists

=== Other command flags ===
Flag	Date	Designation	Description
	1935–1945	Commodore pennant	The pennant raked in the topmast was cut to 60% of the total length.
	1935–1945	Seniority pennant	Like the commodore pennant but hoisted on the Yard
	1935–1945	Leader pennant	Like Kommodorestander, but freely swinging
	1935–1945	Flotilla pennant	Hoisted in the top mast
	1935–1945	Group pennant	Like the flotilla pennant but hoisted on the Yard
	1935–1945	Command pennant	The pennant was cut in a quarter of the total length and had a height-to-length ratio of 15:1000.

=== Vehicle flags and pennants ===
Flag	Date	Designation	Description
	1940–1945	Vehicle pennant for admirals as a land troop commander	All pennants and flags had a length-to-height ratio of 5:3.
	1940–1945	Vehicle pennant for sea commanders and brigade commanders of the Kriegsmarine	
	1940–1943	Vehicle pennant for department commanders of the Kriegsmarine	
	1943–1945	Vehicle pennant for department commanders of the Kriegsmarine	The yellow, clear anchor was added on 20 January 1943.
	1940–1943	Vehicle pennant for navy fortress commanders in staff officer positions and navy regimental commanders	
	1943–1945	Vehicle pennant for navy fortress commanders in staff officer positions and navy regimental commanders	The yellow, clear anchor was added on 20 January 1943.
	1940–1945	Car pennant for admirals	The pennant had a width of 35 cm and a height of 23 cm. The golden border, decorated with a total of 42 swastikas, had a width between 25 and 30 mm. The Reichsadler was of yellow colour.
	1940–1945	Car pennant for other members of the navy	The pennant had a width of 33 mm at a height of 22 cm. The golden edge had a width of 6 mm. The Reichsadler was of yellow colour.

=== War merit pennants ===
Flag	Date	Designation	Description
	1941–1945	War merit pennant	Awarded to captains of vessels not sailing under the Reichskriegsflagge for "extraordinary merit in warfare"
	1943–1945	Swallowtailed pennant for the destruction of enemy ships by coastal defence	Awarded to coastal defence units for the destruction of cruisers and above
	1943–1945	Pennant for the destruction of ships by coastal defence	Awarded to coastal defence units for the destruction of destroyers and below
	1940–1945	Pennant for the downing of enemy aircraft	Awarded to the responsible unit for downing of enemy aircraft (one for each aircraft) by anti-aircraft batteries or light anti-aircraft weapons

=== Flag for Landwehr Kriegsmarine units ===
Flag	Date	Designation	Description
	1936–1945	Flag for land-based troop units or installations of the German Navy (left side)	Introduced on 8 September 1936. As prescribed for all flags of the Wehrmacht, the dimensions of the flag were 126 by 126 cm. It was attached to a 3 meter long flagpole.
	1936–1945	Flag for land-based troop units or installations of the German Navy (right side)	Same as above

== Other naval flags ==
Flag	Date	Designation	Description
	1935–1936	Water sports flag	The black-white-red flag with a white, 45 degree twisted anchor on the black stripe. Used from 31 May 1935 to 17 January 1936
	1936–1945	Water sports flag	On a black, white-lined, clear anchor placed a white disc with the swastika. Adopted on 6 April 1936
	1935–1945	Pilot flag	Flag of pilot vehicles and pilot signal. The height or width of the white stripe was one fifth of the height of the inner flag.
	1935–1945	Identification mark of Weserlotsen vehicles	Placed in the topmast and indicated that the pilot vehicle has ready-to-use pilots on board. The size ratios of the flag were 5:9.
	1936–1945	Postal navy flag	Introduced on 14 March 1936

== Flags for special occasions ==
Flag	Date	Designation	Description
	1935–1945	Black-white-red imperial war ensign	Hoisted on commemoration days on special orders
	1935–1945	Imperial war ensign	Hoisted as a flag on every 31 May (remembrance of the Battle of Jutland)
	1940–1945	Austro-Hungarian war flag	Raised as a flag on the heavy cruiser Prinz Eugen in place of the imperial war ensign on every 31 May

== See also ==
- List of flags of the Luftwaffe (1933–1945)
- List of flags of the Wehrmacht and Heer (1933–1945)

== Literature ==
- Angolia, John R.; Schlicht, Adolf (1993). Die Kriegsmarine - Uniforms & Traditions 3 Volume. R. James Bender Publication. ISBN 9780912138459.
- Busch, Rainer; Röll, Hans-Joachim (2003). Der U-Boot-Krieg 1939–1945 — Die Ritterkreuzträger der U-Boot-Waffe von September 1939 bis Mai 1945 [The U-Boat War 1939–1945 — The Knight's Cross Bearers of the U-Boat Force from September 1939 to May 1945] (in German). Hamburg, Berlin, Bonn Germany: Verlag E.S. Mittler & Sohn. ISBN 978-3-8132-0515-2.
- Davis, Brian Leigh (1984). Flags & standards of the Third Reich: Army, navy, & air force, 1933-1945. Arco Pub. ISBN 978-0668036207.
- Oberkommando der Kriegsmarine (1992). Das große Flaggenbuch (in German). Mauritius Buch Verlag. ISBN 978-3980334204.
