= Alter Jägermarsch =

"Sechseläutenmarsch" (1:19)

Alter Jägermarsch (AM II, 239), also known as the Marsch der Freiwilligen Jäger aus den Befreiungskriegen or simply Jägermarsch (Russian: Егерский марш) is a Russo-German military march with origins from the Coalition Wars.The march was most commonly used by HM Life Guards Jäger Regiment of the Russian Empire, and was also found in the Prussian Armeemarschsammlung.

Today, the march is most commonly associated with the Soviet Union and the Russian Federation, under the name or Russkaya Slava (Russian: Русская Слава, lit. 'Russian Glory'). With the rehabilitation of pre-revolutionary Russian military traditions into the Soviet Army by Joseph Stalin during the Great Patriotic War, the march saw renewed use, and was included in the 1945 Moscow Victory Parade.

A variant of the march is also considered the unofficial anthem of Zurich, with the name Sechseläutenmarsch.

== History ==
Suvorov with the Imperial Russian Army at the Gotthard Pass.

The origins of Alter Jägermarsch are unclear. Melodic similarities can be found in the works of Jean Baptiste Lully, from the reign of Louis XIV of France. A number of sources attribute the march to the Russian general Alexander Suvorov, likely adopted by the Imperial Russian Army during the War of the Second Coalition. However, the piece is not included in Anton Dörfeldt's Imperial Russian March Collection (1809-1816), nor was adopted as a regimental march. Nonetheless, Jägermarsch saw frequent use until falling out of practice as a result of the Russian Revolution and subsequent Civil War.

Forces of the Soviet Armed Forces marching to Jägermarsch during the 1945 Moscow Victory Parade (10:32)

In order to boost esprit de corps during the Great Patriotic War, a large number of Tsarist military traditions were rehabilitated into the Soviet Army under the command of Joseph Stalin. Subsequently, the march saw renewed use, being used prominently in the 1945 Moscow Victory Parade. The march would come into common use with the Group of Soviet Forces in Germany and East German National People's Army, as well as occasional use in Soviet and later Russian aligned countries.

The march was adopted by the Prussian Army from their Russian allies, as the Marsch der Freiwilligen Jäger aus den Befreiungskriegen, in reference to the War of the Sixth Coalition (Known in Germany as the War of Liberation). The march was adapted by Heinrich Homann, the Bandmaster of the 2nd Royal Prussian Pomeranian Jäger Battalion. The march was officially placed in the Prussian Armeemarschsammlung by Kaiser Wilhelm II. Following the collapse of the German Empire, the march would continue to be used by the inter-war Reichswehr and later Wehrmacht. Following the war, the West German Bundeswehr largely abandoned the ceremonies of Prussian militarism. As a result, while the march remains in limited use, this is largely in a historical context and mostly confined to ceremonial use. Due to the heavy influence of Imperial Germany on Chile, Alter Jägermarsch remains in common use in the Chilean Armed Forces.

Festive variants of the march can be found throughout Switzerland and Germany, in cities such as Zurich, Sankt Goar and Rottweil, most prominently as the Sechseläutenmarsch. A section was used as a jingle for the radio station Energy Zürich.

== See also ==
- Der Hohenfriedberger
