= List of Soviet military units that lost their standards in World War II =

During World War II each unit of the Red Army had a military standard, as required by the Decree on Revolutionary Red Banners of the WPRA Units from 11 June 1926 (superseded by the Decree on the Red Banner of the Military Units of the Red Army from 21 December 1942). The standards were typically in the form of a rectangular red banner with the Soviet state emblem and the unit's name on the front side. The decree required the standard to be present at the battlefield. The loss of the standard "due to faintheartedness" was punishable by court-martial and the disbandment of the military unit. On several occasions the standards were saved at the cost of life or hidden to prevent their capture. However, within months following the invasion of the Soviet Union the Germans captured dozens of Soviet regimental and divisional standards. Some others were later either retrieved or substituted with new ones.

== Battalions ==
Unit	Details of the standard's loss
97th Separate Communication Battalion	Captured by the Germans in 1941
132nd Separate NKVD Escort Troops Battalion	Captured by the Germans after the defense of Brest Fortress, being found under the fortress' ruins
573rd Communication Battalion	Stolen due to negligence of Lieutenant Pavlov. Captain Rutkovsky, who entrusted the standard to Pavlov, was arrested for 15 days, reduced in rank, and had half of his salary withheld

== Regiments ==
Unit	Details of the standard's loss
8th Guards Airborne Rifle Regiment	Lost in 1944 during the battle of Nyíregyháza. Because the regiment's personnel had been killed in action while protecting the standard, the People's Commissar of Defense allowed the regiment to receive a new standard and retain its Guards status.
9th Vyborg Rifle Regiment	Captured by the Germans in 1941
10th Guards Airborne Rifle Regiment	Lost in 1944 during the battle of Nyíregyháza. Alongside the 8th Guards Airborne Rifle Regiment, the regiment was allowed by the People's Commissar of Defense to receive a new standard and retain its Guards status, as its personnel had also died while protecting the standard.
16th Rifle Regiment	Lost in unclear circumstances after the battle on 10 February 1943, the prosecutor's investigation was inconclusive.
30th Horse Artillery Regiment	Captured by the Wehrmacht during the Battle of the Kerch Peninsula
43rd Guards Mortar Regiment	Went missing in the summer of 1942 during an encirclement in Salsk Steppe. The regiment was disbanded, but after it was revealed that the standard had actually been given to a shepherd to prevent its capture, the unit was restored under its original name.
159th Honorary Revolutionary Separate Regiment	Captured by Finnish troops
71st Howitzer Regiment	Captured by the Germans during the Battle of Uman
99th Communication Regiment	Captured by the Germans during the Battle of Uman
133rd Rifle Regiment	Captured by the Germans below Uman
214th Cavalry Regiment	Lost on 26 October 1944 due to internal mismanagement during the battle of Nagykálló. As the result, the regiment was transformed into a penal military unit and its commander, Lieutenant Colonel Yevgeny Danilevich, was reduced in rank to major. In February 1945 the regiment was restored to its original status. This is the only case of punishment of the entire unit for the loss of standard during the war.
220th Cavalry Regiment	Lost in 1944 during the battle of Nagykálló, and later retrieved after eight days
243rd Howitzer Artillery Regiment	Captured by the Germans in 1941
243rd Rifle Regiment	Captured by the Germans in 1941
283rd Corps Artillery Regiment	Captured by the Germans in the village Podvysokoye (present Ukraine), hung at the headquarters of commander Ludwig Kübler
479th Anti-Aircraft Regiment	Captured in 1941
754th Howitzer Artillery Regiment	Burned down in February 1944 after the staff car transporting it had been directly hit by an aircraft bomb
945th Rifle Regiment	Captured by the Germans in 1945 during the battle of Metgethen
975th Artillery Regiment	Lost in action during the Second Battle of Kharkov. The regiment was disbanded and transformed into a rifle regiment.

== Divisions ==
Unit	Details of the standard's loss
18th Rifle Division	Captured in 1940 by Finnish troops during the Winter War
23rd Guards Rifle Division	Burned down on 24 April 1945 after the staff car transporting it had been fired upon during the Battle of Berlin
24th Samara–Ulyanovsk Rifle Division	Lost within weeks after the invasion of the Soviet Union. Retrieved after the liberation of Smolensk Oblast
44th Guards Rifle Division	Lost during transportation. Private Tuchin, who was ultimately responsible for the standard's transportation, shot himself. Two other responsible persons, Captain Ustinov and starshina Pestov, were court-martialed and sentenced to 10 and 7 years in prison, respectively. As the standard had been lost due to negligence and not at the battlefield, the division was ultimately allowed to receive a new standard.
86th Rifle Division	Burned down in the division's headquarters during the German bombing of Ciechanowiec in 1941
181st Rifle Division	Captured in August 1942 when the division's commander Major General Timofey Novikov and his entourage tried to escape from encirclement
299th Rifle Division	Captured by the Germans during the battle of Dedilovo in 1941
335th Rifle Division	Lost during the division's escape from encirclement in 1942
365th Rifle Division	Lost around 17 February 1942 during the division's attempt to escape from encirclement in the Battles of Rzhev

== See also ==
- List of German standards at the Moscow Victory Parade of 1945
