= Reichskriegsflagge =

War flags and war ensigns used by the German armed forces

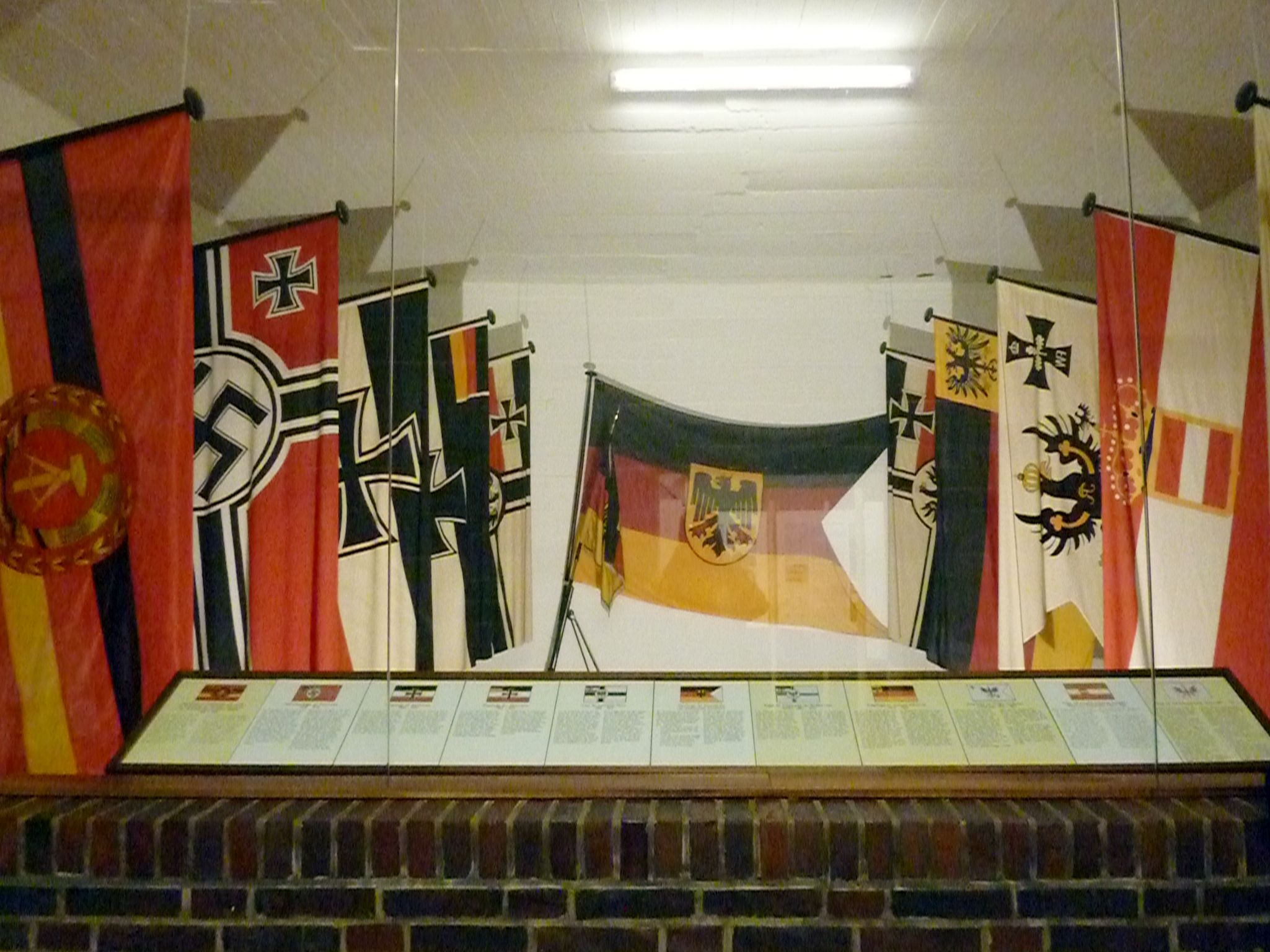
German, Prussian, and Austrian war ensigns, including those called "Reichskriegsflagge"

The term Reichskriegsflagge (German: [ˈʁaɪçsˌkʁiːksflaɡə], lit. 'Imperial War Flag') refers to several war flags and war ensigns used by the German armed forces in history. A total of eight different designs were used in 1848–1849 and between 1867–1871 and 1945.

Today the term refers usually to the flag from 1867–1871 to 1918, the war flag of Imperial Germany.

== History ==
=== North German Confederation ===
After the Austro-Prussian War, the entire German coastline was controlled by Prussia and its allies (blue).

The State of the Teutonic Order (whose flag is shown here) greatly influenced the history of Prussia, which became the dominant German state and the source for most of the new war ensign's visual elements.

After Prussia defeated Austria in 1866, the North German Confederation was founded by Prussia in order to replace the former German Confederation in which Austria had been the dominant power. The new Confederation eventually became the German Empire after the Franco-Prussian War, hence the Imperial German flags date back to the North German Confederation.

Because Prussia had emerged as the leading German state and the black-red-golden colour scheme was, at that time, associated with pan-Germanism (a Germany including Austria) and the revolution of 1848, the Prussian king and President of the North German Confederation, Wilhelm I, insisted on using new flags inspired by Prussia and without the traditional German colours. Therefore, the North German and eventually Imperial German flags prominently featured the Prussian colours (black and white) as well as symbols like the Prussian eagle and the Iron Cross. And while seafaring was the traditional domain of the Hanse in Germany, virtually all of the 19th century German coastline (including the North Sea coast) and naval power belonged to Prussia after the decisive victory in 1866.

Prince Adalbert of Prussia, the commander-in-chief of the North German Navy, was commissioned with the task of designing the new war ensign. Around 1850, he already had designed a number of potential war ensigns for a hypothetical German nation-state under Prussian rule, which never were adopted as the project was not realised at that time. He used his old ideas to design the new North German war ensign with heavy involvement of the Prussian king, leading to numerous changes, like the inclusion of the Iron Cross in its original shape.

The flag that was finally adopted became the war ensign of the German Empire after its founding, similar to the North German merchant ensign.

One of Prince Adalbert's early proposals for a German war ensign, featuring a black cross outlined in white atop a red banner

One of Prince Adalbert's early proposals for a German war ensign, featuring a black cross outlined in white atop the black-red-yellow tricolor of Germany

One of Prince Adalbert's early proposals for a German war ensign, featuring a black cross outlined in white atop a yellow-red bicolor

One of Prince Adalbert's early proposals for a German war ensign, 1849

1867 proposal for a North German war ensign

The final design for the North German war ensign, 1867

=== German Empire ===
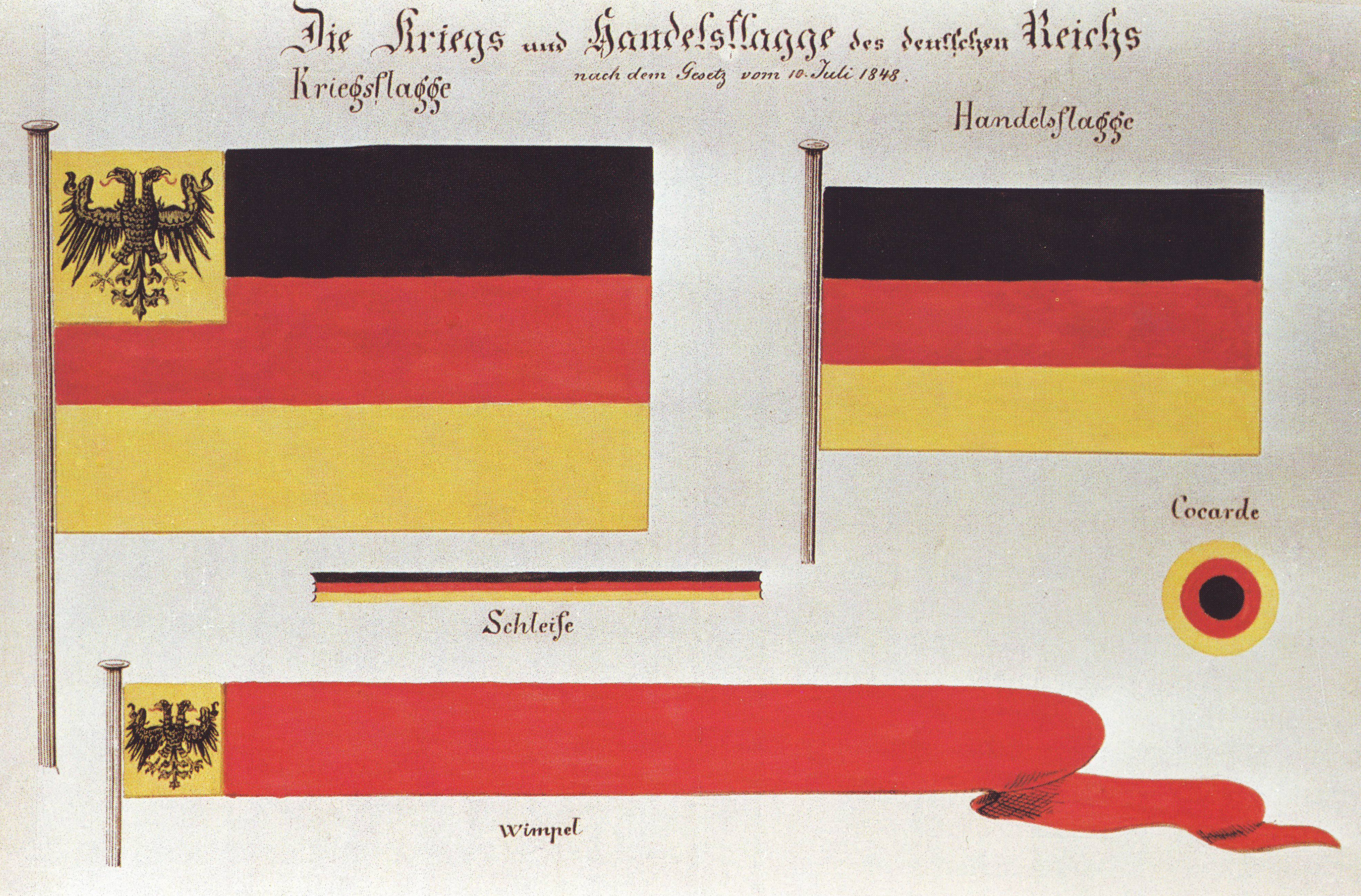
Draft for the imperial and commercial flag of 1848

The first German imperial war flag was introduced by imperial law on 12 November 1848. The Regent signed it that day, although the National Assembly had already voted for it on 31 July. The law described the commercial and war flag of the emerging new German federal state. The 'German colours' – black, red and gold – were so popular from their beginnings on a Thuringian principality's state flag in 1778 that it did not seem necessary to mention them in the constitution of 1849. The flag was used for the Imperial Fleet. The short battle near Heligoland on 4 June 1849 was the first and only maritime battle in which these colours were involved.

The Federal Diet had already adopted the German colours on 9 March 1848, but the Diet and also the Central Powers forgot to announce the new flag to the foreign powers. By May 1850, the flag was recognised by the U.S., the Netherlands, Belgium, Sardinia, the Ottoman Empire, Portugal, the Kingdom of the Two Sicilies, Spain, Greece, and (conditionally) France. The reestablished German Confederation took over the fleet, but sold it in 1852 and did not make use of the German colours again until the 1860s.

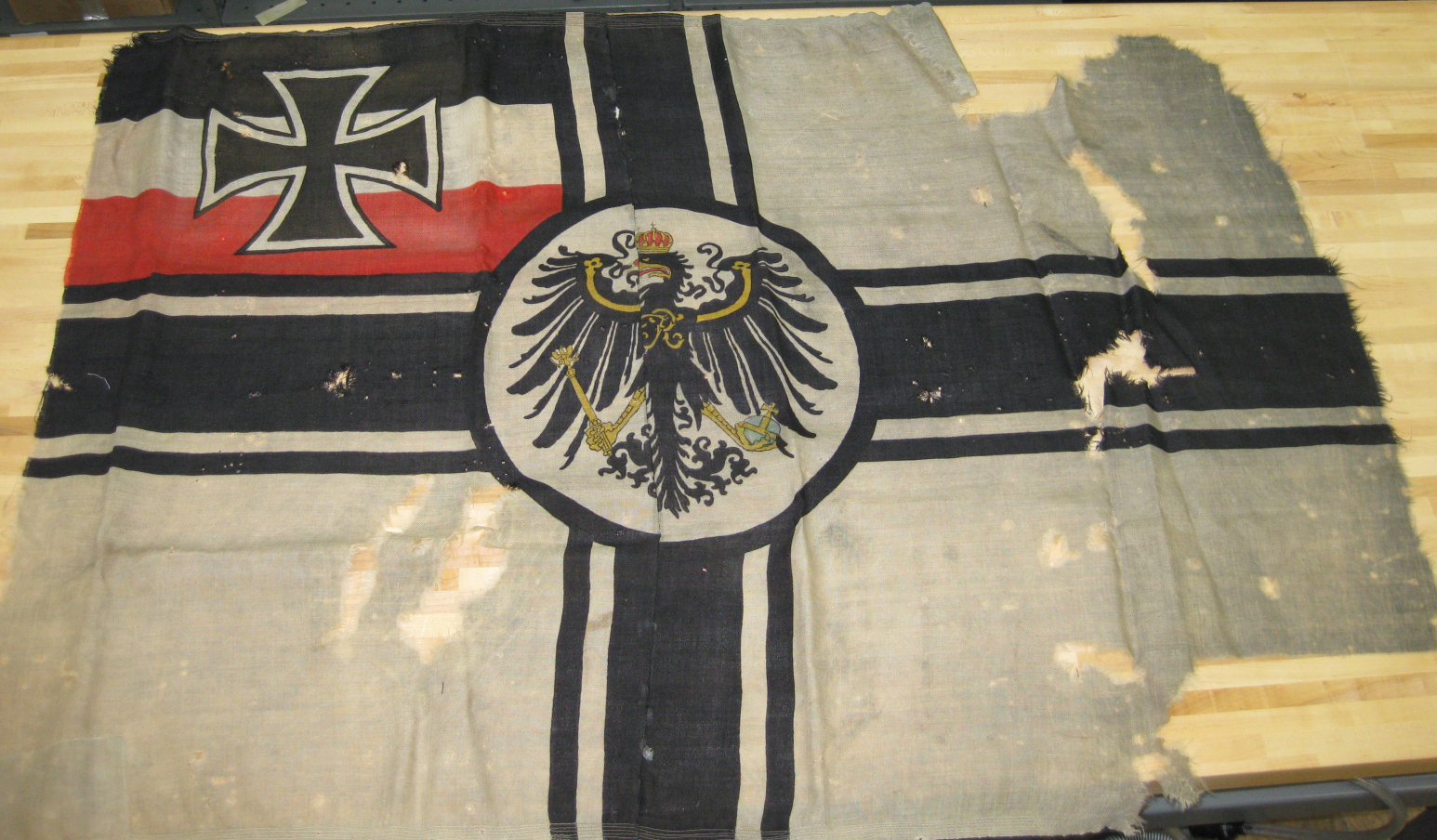
An original World War I German war ensign

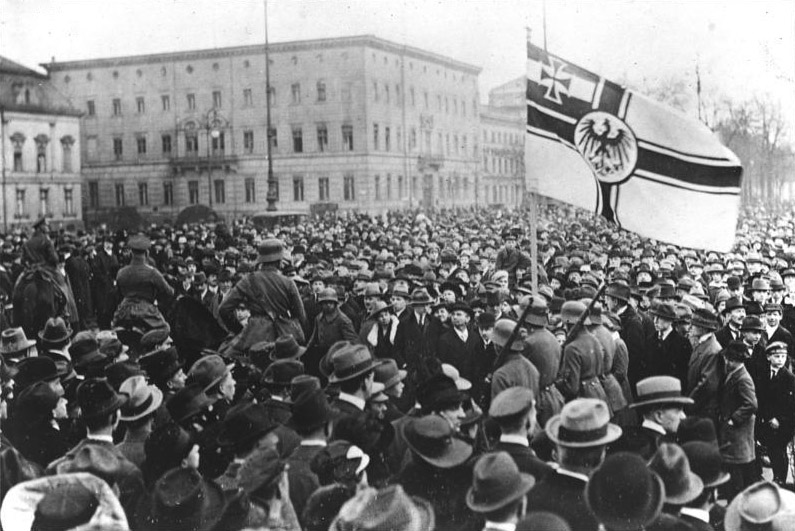
Imperial flag being used during the Kapp Putsch of 1920

The German war flag, which was slightly changed twice during the Wilhelmine Period (see gallery below), was in common use in World War I. It continued to have Prussia's national colours of black and white, the eagle of Prussia, the Nordic cross, with the German imperial black-white-red tricolour in the upper canton with an Iron Cross. In 1919, the flags of Imperial Germany were scrapped and replaced by those of the Weimar Republic: a black-red-gold tricolour.

German nationalists, such as the Freikorps (see Marinebrigade Ehrhardt), used the old flag in protest against the Weimar Republic during the 1920s and 1930s. This included the 1920 attempt to overthrow the Weimar government, known as the Kapp Putsch. The Nazi Party of Adolf Hitler had a party flag based on the old colours.

=== Nazi Germany ===
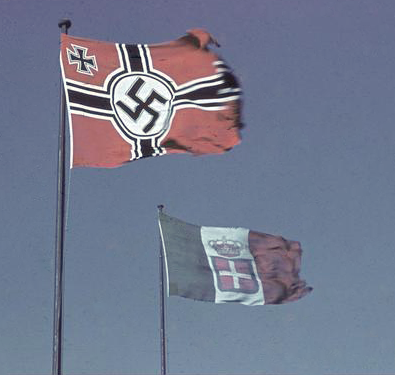
The World War II Reich war flag and the flag of the Kingdom of Italy in Rome, June 1943

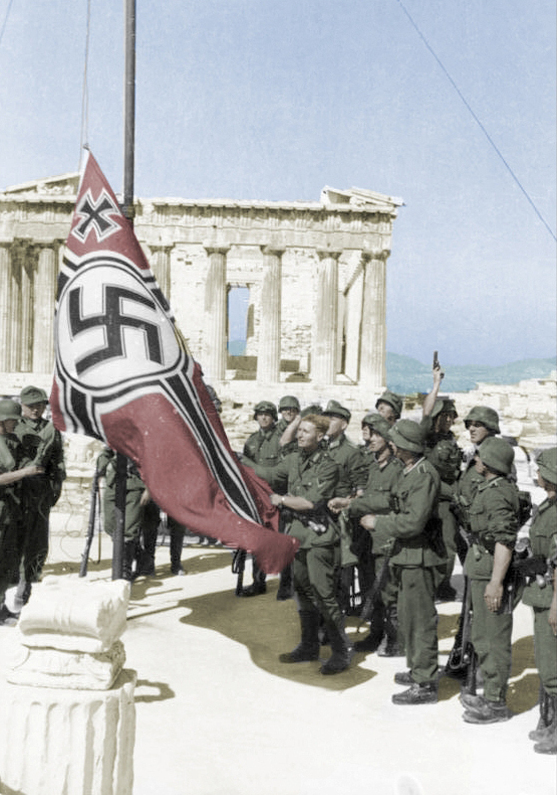
German soldiers preparing to raise the Reichkriegsflagge atop the Acropolis of Athens in May 1941

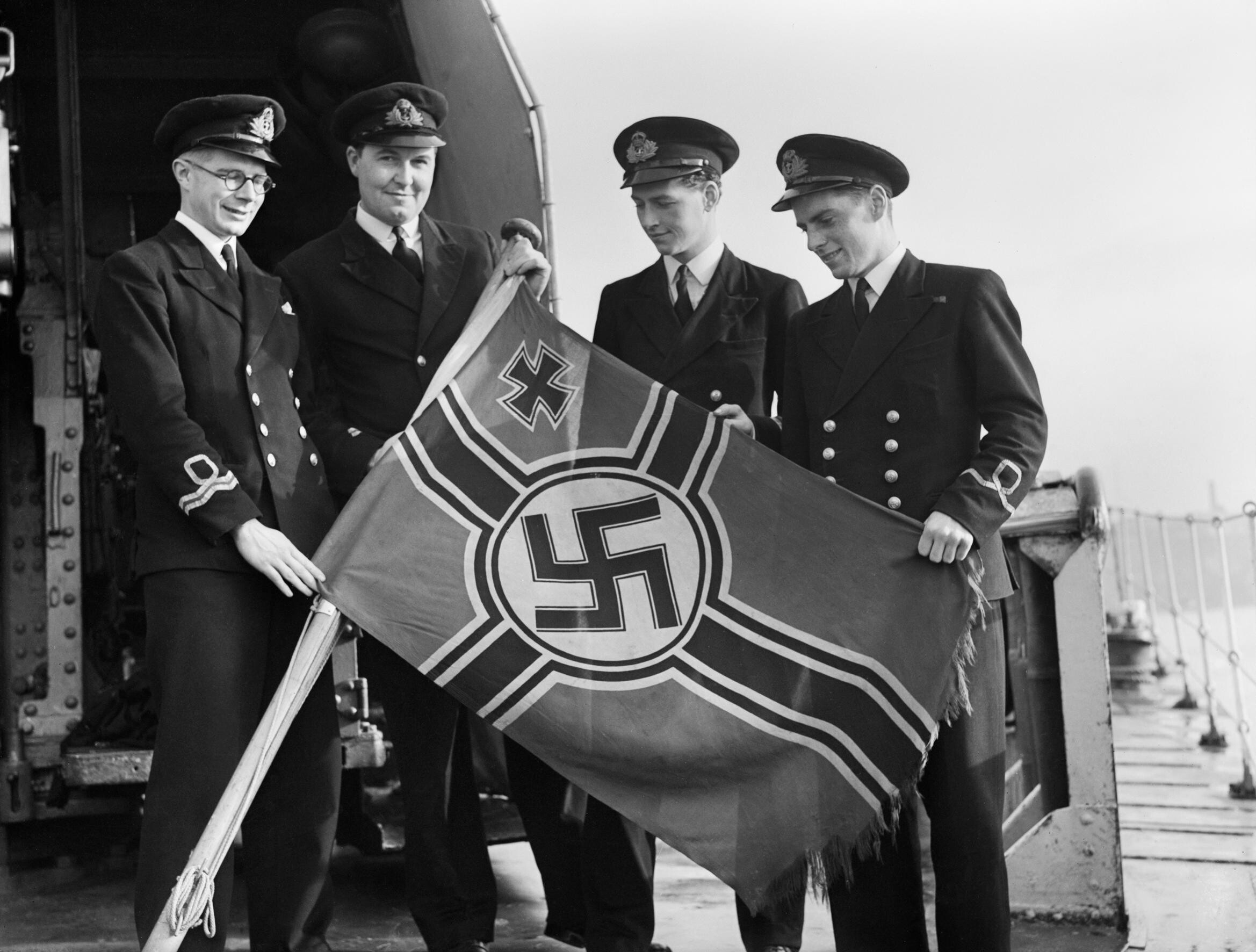
Royal Navy officers with a captured Reichskriegsflagge from an e-boat, 1944

Designed personally by Hitler, this flag served the Heer and the Luftwaffe as their war flag, and the Kriegsmarine as its war ensign (the national flag serving as jack). This flag was hoisted daily in barracks operated by units of the Wehrmacht, and it had to be flown from a pole positioned near the barracks entrance, or failing this, near the guard room or staff building. New recruits in the latter part of World War II were sworn in on this flag (one recruit holding the flag and taking the oath on behalf of the entire recruit class with the recruits looking on as witnesses – before, this was done on the regimental colours).

The flag had to be formally hoisted every morning and lowered every evening. These hoisting and lowering ceremonies took the form of either an ordinary or a ceremonial flag parade. At the ordinary raising, the party consisted of the Orderly Officer of the Day, the guard, and one musician. At the ceremonial raising, one officer, one platoon of soldiers with rifles, the guard, the regimental band, and the corps of drums were all present.

The proportions of the flag are 3:5. Fusing elements of the Nazi flag (swastika and red background) with that of the old Imperial Reich war flag (four arms emanating from off-centre circle and Iron Cross in the canton), these flags were uniformly produced as a printed design on bunting.

Raised for the first time at the Bendlerstraße Building (Wehrmacht Headquarters) in Berlin on 7 November 1935, it was taken down for the last time by British occupation forces after the arrest of the Dönitz Government at the Naval Academy Mürwik in Flensburg-Mürwik on 23 May 1945.

In his book, Inside the Third Reich, Albert Speer states that "in only two other designs did he (Adolf Hitler) execute the same care as he did his Obersalzberg house: that of the Reich war flag and his own standard of Chief of State."

=== Post-war ===
==== Germany ====
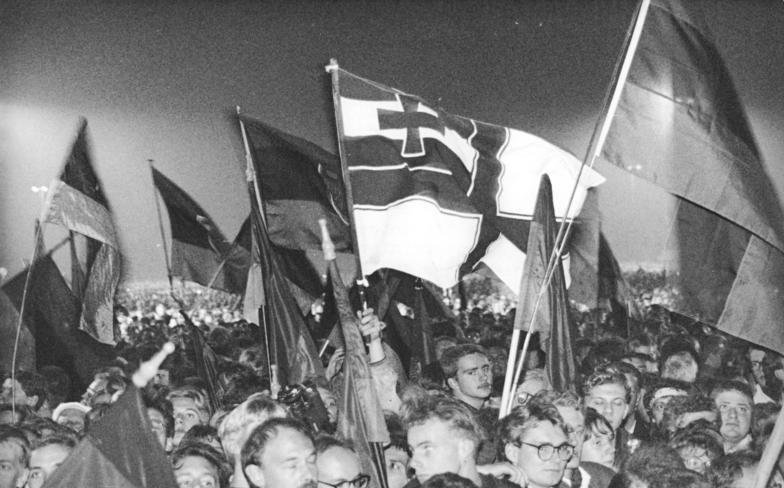
Homemade Reichskriegsfahne at German reunification celebrations in 1990

Outside of educational, artistic, or scientific contexts, selling and showing symbols of Nazi Germany, including the Reichskriegsfahne, is illegal in Germany according to Strafgesetzbuch section 86a. This covers the version used after 1935 with the swastika. The punishment can be up to three years in prison.

However, the black-white-red tricolour flag used between 1871 and 1918–19 can be shown. Its use is considered to be a "breach of the public order" in seven states, and flags could be confiscated. In the other nine states, any provocative misuse of the flag can be prosecuted as an Ordnungswidrigkeit ("act contrary to order", an administrative offence that can be handled without a court process and that carries only a fine that is not legally considered a punishment).

From September 2020, the public display of all versions of the war flags of the North German Confederation and of all periods of the German Reich became prohibited in the state of Bremen and violators can be fined up to €1,000; the black, white and red tricolour of the German Reich can be confiscated as well if there is a concrete provocation effect.

In June 2021 the Innenministerkonferenz (the Federal Interior Minister and the state interior ministers) published a decree extending the Bremen style prohibitions of 2020 to all of Germany. The prohibition includes various imperial war flags (German: Reichskriegsflaggen), but also the simple black-white-red Imperial flag of 1871–1918 and 1933–1935 when used in a provocative context.

This last round of prohibition decrees (since September 2020) was triggered by an event on 29 August 2020 when a right-wing demonstration escalated into an attempted storming of the Reichstag building. The majority of the flags shown were variations of the imperial black-white-red. Thomas Strobl, head of the Innenministerkonferenz, was quoted as saying that these flags are the modern ersatz go-to for what would else be swastika flags and should be understood as such.

==== United States ====
In the United States, conversely, American-founded white supremacist groups like the Ku Klux Klan have used the Reichskriegsfahne side-by-side with the Confederate "battle flag" at their gatherings at times. As the public display of Nazi flags within the United States is protected by the First Amendment to the United States Constitution which guarantees the right to freedom of speech, sights like the Nazi and Confederate "rebel flag" together at white supremacist events are also legally protected free speech in the United States.

== Gallery ==
War flag of the Imperial Fleet of 1848–1852

North German Federal Navy (1867–1871) and Kaiserliche Marine war ensign (1871–1892) (Reichskriegsfahne)

Kaiserliche Marine war ensign (1892–1903)

Kaiserliche Marine war ensign (1903–1919)

1919–1921 war ensign (de facto never used)

1921–1933 war ensign

1933–1935 war ensign

1935–1938 war ensign

1938–1945 war ensign

== See also ==
- Blutfahne
- Flag of Germany
- Flag of Nazi Germany
- Personal standard of Adolf Hitler
- Rising Sun Flag
- Cross of Burgundy
