= List of German standards at the Moscow Victory Parade of 1945 =

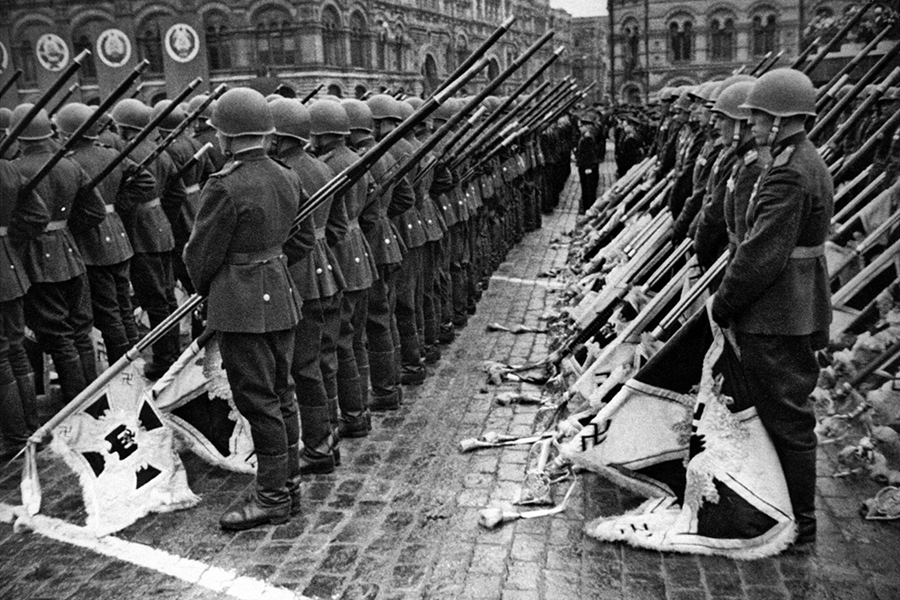
German standards and flags at the parade

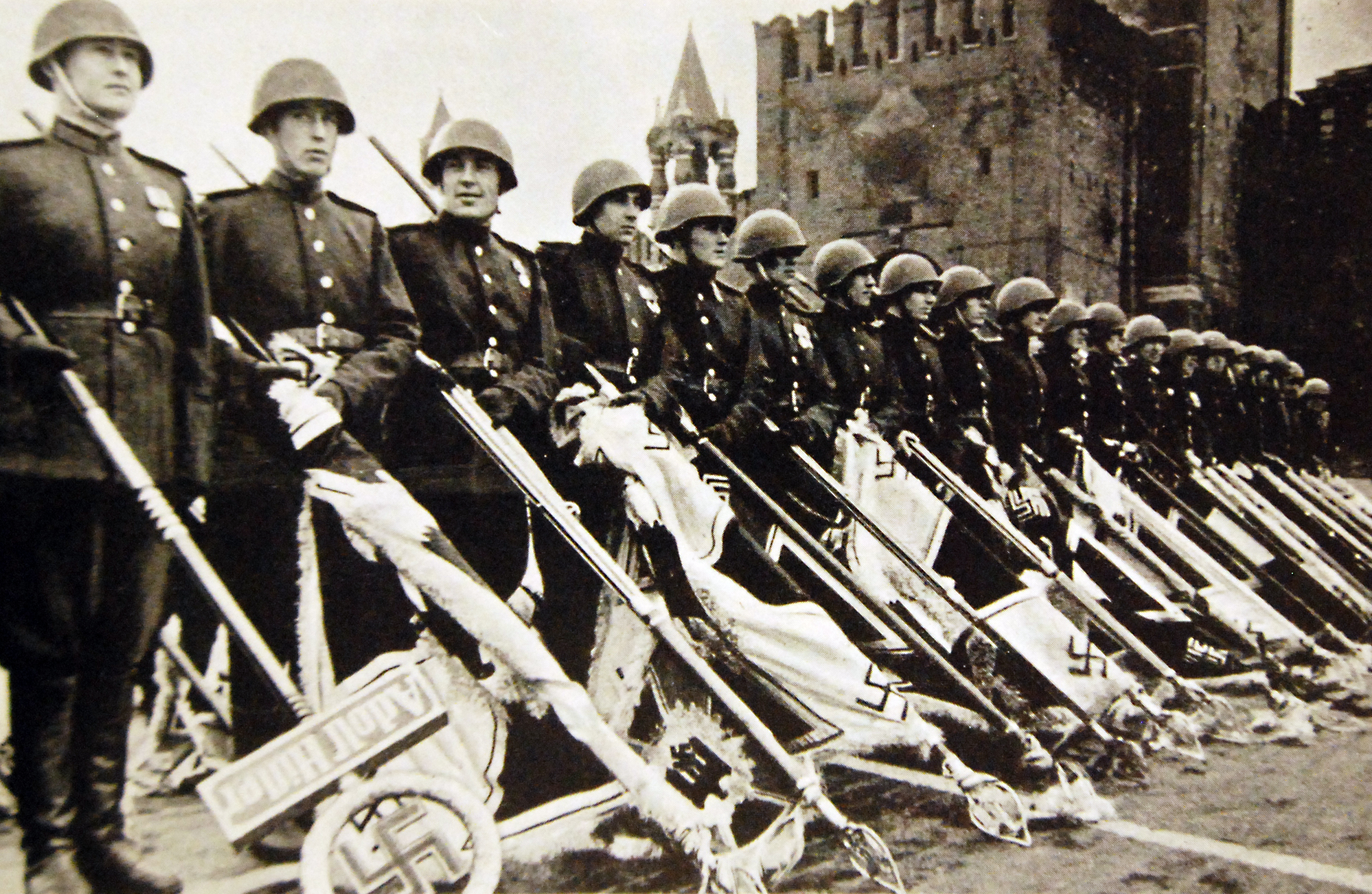
The LSSAH banner staff at the parade (first from left)

At the Moscow Victory Parade of 24 June 1945, marking the defeat of Nazi Germany, there were a total of 200 captured German military standards and flags, majority being from the Wehrmacht. The standards (German: Standarten) were rectangular and swallowtailed, while flags (German: Fahnen) were larger and square. Carried by a battalion of the Separate Operational Purpose Division of the NKVD, they were thrown to the steps of Lenin's Mausoleum under drumroll. Most standards were made in 1935. There was also the banner staff of the 1st SS Panzer Division "Leibstandarte SS Adolf Hitler" (LSSAH); its banner had been found separately and was not brought to the parade. The staff was carried in a prominent place on the right of the front rank of the first column of soldiers. It has been incorrectly called Adolf Hitler's personal standard.

The standards were selected from a pool of about 900 standards and banners shipped to Moscow from Berlin and Dresden. Some of them were collected by SMERSH trophy teams in May 1945 and some were taken from German museums (in 1944 Adolf Hitler ordered all military standards to be moved to museums, possibly to prevent their capture in battle). The LSSAH banner staff was captured in the Battle of Berlin.

After the parade additional colour shots were made showing the flags of various Nazi organisations and other veteran organisations being thrown to the ground. The shots were added to the official film of the parade. The idea to have German standards at the parade and throw them to the ground was suggested by Soviet leader Joseph Stalin in May 1945. The show of contempt stemmed from the old custom of "disdain not for the enemy, but for his fallen military honors" by the troops of Russian general Alexander Suvorov.

The following list is based on the list of standards approved by Colonel Peredelsky on 21 June 1945. It is divided into battalion, Abteilung, (Note: Abteilung is variously translated as battalion or detachment, although the Wehrmacht distinguished between battalion and Abteilung. Peredelsky's list uses its Soviet equivalent, divizion, but also includes three battalions among them.) and regimental standards and flags (although during the war the Soviets captured standards of larger German units, such as the XLVII Panzer Corps). Peredelsky's list includes older Imperial German standards (mostly cavalry) and Nazi police flags. The banner staff of LSSAH was approved separately from the list. Most standards are now housed in the Central Armed Forces Museum of Moscow, while some are kept in museums of other countries.

== Battalion flags and standards ==
Flag / standard	Unit	Service branch
	1st Battalion of the 1st Infantry Regiment	Infantry
	1st Battalion of the 1st Panzer Brigade	Panzer
	1st Battalion of the 2nd Panzer Regiment	Panzer
	1st Battalion of the 3rd Infantry Regiment	Infantry
	1st Battalion of the 6th Cavalry Rifle Regiment	Cavalry
	1st Battalion of the 7th Cavalry Rifle Regiment	Cavalry
	1st Battalion of the 7th Infantry Regiment	Infantry
	1st Battalion of the 10th Infantry Regiment	Infantry
	1st Battalion of the 13th Infantry Regiment	Infantry
	1st Battalion of the 14th unknown unit	
	1st Battalion of the 15th Infantry Regiment	Infantry
	1st Battalion of the 15th Panzer Regiment	Panzer
	1st Battalion of the 21st Reconnaissance Regiment	Reconnaissance
	1st Battalion of the 22nd Infantry Regiment	Infantry
	1st Battalion of the 23rd Infantry Regiment	Infantry
	1st Battalion of the 24th Infantry Regiment	Infantry
	1st Battalion of the 27th Panzer Regiment	Panzer
	1st Battalion of the 28th Infantry Regiment	Infantry
	1st Battalion of the 30th Infantry Regiment	Infantry
	1st Battalion of the 31st Panzer Regiment	Panzer
	1st Battalion of the 36th Infantry Regiment	Infantry
	1st Battalion of the 38th Infantry Regiment	Infantry
	1st Battalion of the 43rd Infantry Regiment	Infantry
	1st Battalion of the 45th Infantry Regiment	Infantry
	1st Battalion of the 49th Infantry Regiment	Infantry
	1st Battalion of the 51st Infantry Regiment	Infantry
	1st Battalion of the 57th Infantry Regiment	Infantry
	1st Battalion of the 59th Infantry Regiment	Infantry
	1st Battalion of the 68th Combat Engineer Regiment	Combat engineers
	1st Battalion of the 71st Infantry Regiment	Infantry
	1st Battalion of the 81st Infantry Regiment	Infantry
	1st Battalion of the 83rd Infantry Regiment	Infantry
	1st Battalion of the 84th Infantry Regiment	Infantry
	1st Battalion of the 88th Infantry Regiment	Infantry
	1st Battalion of the 106th Infantry Regiment	Infantry
	1st Battalion of the 116th Infantry Regiment	Infantry
	1st Bicycle Infantry Battalion	Infantry
	1st Combat Engineer Battalion	Combat engineers
	1st Communication Battalion	Signal Corps
	1st Jäger Battalion of the 2nd Infantry Regiment	Infantry
	1st Police Unit	Police
	1st Rifle Motorcycle Battalion	Motorised Rifles
	1st Vehicle Transport Battalion	Transport troops
	2nd Battalion of the 1st Infantry Regiment	Infantry
	2nd Battalion of the 1st Panzer Regiment	Panzer
	2nd Battalion of the 2nd Infantry Regiment	Infantry
	2nd Battalion of the 2nd Panzer Regiment	Panzer
	2nd Battalion of the 3rd Infantry Regiment	Infantry
	2nd Battalion of the 6th Rifle Cavalry Regiment	Cavalry
	2nd Battalion of the 7th Cavalry Rifle Regiment	Cavalry
	2nd Battalion of the 7th Infantry Regiment	Infantry
	2nd Battalion of the 7th Reserve Regiment	
	2nd Battalion of the 13th Infantry Regiment	Infantry
	2nd Battalion of the 14th Infantry Regiment	Infantry
	2nd Battalion of the 15th Combat Engineer Regiment	Combat engineers
	2nd Battalion of the 15th Infantry Regiment	Infantry
	2nd Battalion of the 15th Reconnaissance Regiment	Reconnaissance
	2nd Battalion of the 22nd Infantry Regiment	Infantry
	2nd Battalion of the 23rd Infantry Regiment	Infantry
	2nd Battalion of the 24th Infantry Regiment	Infantry
	2nd Battalion of the 28th Infantry Regiment (Note: Listed twice in Peredelsky's list, under no. 38 and no. 49.)	Infantry
	2nd Battalion of the 28th Infantry Regiment	
	2nd Battalion of the 30th Infantry Regiment	Infantry
	2nd Battalion of the 36th Infantry Regiment	Infantry
	2nd Battalion of the 38th Infantry Regiment	Infantry
	2nd Battalion of the 43rd Infantry Regiment	Infantry
	2nd Battalion of the 44th Infantry Regiment	Infantry
	2nd Battalion of the 45th Infantry Regiment	Infantry
	2nd Battalion of the 49th Infantry Regiment	Infantry
	2nd Battalion of the 51st Infantry Regiment	Infantry
	2nd Battalion of the 57th Infantry Regiment	Infantry
	2nd Battalion of the 59th Infantry Regiment	Infantry
	2nd Battalion of the 68th Combat Engineer Regiment	Combat engineers
	2nd Battalion of the 71st Infantry Regiment	Infantry
	2nd Battalion of the 81st Infantry Regiment	Infantry
	2nd Battalion of the 83th Infantry Regiment	Infantry
	2nd Battalion of the 84th Infantry Regiment	Infantry
	2nd Battalion of the 88th Infantry Regiment	Infantry
	2nd Battalion of the 116th Infantry Regiment	Infantry
	2nd Battalion of the 116th Reserve Regiment	
	2nd Battalion of the unnumbered infantry regiment	Infantry
	3rd Battalion of the 1st Infantry Regiment	Infantry
	3rd Battalion of the 2nd Infantry Regiment	Infantry
	3rd Battalion of the 3rd Infantry Regiment	Infantry
	3rd Battalion of the 7th Infantry Regiment	Infantry
	3rd Battalion of the 11th Reserve Regiment	
	3rd Battalion of the 22nd Infantry Regiment	Infantry
	3rd Battalion of the 23rd Infantry Regiment	Infantry
	3rd Battalion of the 24th Infantry Regiment	Infantry
	3rd Battalion of the 28th Infantry Regiment	Infantry
	3rd Battalion of the 30th Infantry Regiment	Infantry
	3rd Battalion of the 33rd Fusilier Regiment	
	3rd Battalion of the 43rd Infantry Regiment	Infantry
	3rd Battalion of the 44th Infantry Regiment	Infantry
	3rd Battalion of the 45th Infantry Regiment	Infantry
	3rd Battalion of the 49th Infantry Regiment	Infantry
	3rd Battalion of the 51st Infantry Regiment	Infantry
	3rd Battalion of the 57th Infantry Regiment	Infantry
	3rd Battalion of the 71st Infantry Regiment	Infantry
	3rd Battalion of the 84th Infantry Regiment	Infantry
	3rd Battalion of the 88th Infantry Regiment	Infantry
	3rd Battalion of the 106th Infantry Regiment	Infantry
	3rd Battalion of the 116th Infantry Regiment	Infantry
	3rd Jäger Battalion of the 15th Infantry Regiment	Infantry
	4th Battalion of the 61st Infantry Regiment	Infantry
	4th Police Unit	Police
	8th Combat Engineer Battalion	Combat engineers
	8th Communication Battalion	Signal Corps
	8th Vehicle Transport Battalion	Transport troops
	9th Machine Gun Battalion	
	9th Panzer Battalion	Panzer
	9th Police Unit	Police
	9th Vehicle Transport Battalion	Transport troops
	11th Combat Engineer Battalion	Combat engineers
	11th Communication Battalion	Signal Corps
	15th Combat Engineer Battalion	Combat engineers
	15th Communication Battalion	Signal Corps
	15th Machine Gun Battalion	
	18th Combat Engineer Battalion	Combat engineers
	18th Communication Battalion	Signal Corps
	21st Combat Engineer Battalion	Combat engineers
	21st Communication Battalion	Signal Corps
	28th Combat Engineer Battalion	Combat engineers
	28th Communication Battalion	Signal Corps
	29th Combat Engineer Battalion	Combat engineers
	29th Communication Battalion	Signal Corps
	29th Police Unit	Police
	31st Machine Gun Battalion	
	37th Communication Battalion	Signal Corps
	38th Machine Gun Battalion	
	41st Combat Engineer Battalion	Combat engineers
	41st Communication Battalion	Signal Corps
	48th Combat Engineer Battalion	Combat engineers
	48th Communication Battalion	Signal Corps
	58th Combat Engineer Battalion	Combat engineers
	59th Machine Gun Battalion	
	67th Panzer Battalion	Panzer
	77th Panzer Communication Battalion	Signal Corps
	Unnumbered Jäger Battalion of the 15th Infantry Regiment	Infantry

== Abteilung standards ==
Standard	Military unit	Service branch
	1st Artillery Instrumental Reconnaissance Abteilung	
	1st Abteilung of the 8th Artillery Regiment	Artillery
	1st Abteilung of the 9th Artillery Regiment	Artillery
	1st Abteilung of the 15th Artillery Regiment	Artillery
	1st Abteilung of the 28th Artillery Regiment	Artillery
	1st Abteilung of the 44th Artillery Regiment	Artillery
	1st Abteilung of the 45th Artillery Regiment	Artillery
	1st Abteilung of the 54th Artillery Regiment	Artillery
	1st Abteilung of the 57th Artillery Regiment	Artillery
	1st Abteilung of the 116th Artillery Regiment	Artillery
	1st Battalion of the 13th Motor Rifle Regiment	Motor Rifles
	2nd Abteilung of the 8th Artillery Regiment	Artillery
	2nd Abteilung of the 9th Artillery Regiment	Artillery
	2nd Abteilung of the 18th Artillery Regiment	Artillery
	2nd Abteilung of the 21st Artillery Regiment	Artillery
	2nd Abteilung of the 28th Artillery Regiment	Artillery
	2nd Abteilung of the 37th Artillery Regiment	Artillery
	2nd Abteilung of the 44th Artillery Regiment	Artillery
	2nd Abteilung of the 47th Artillery Regiment	Artillery
	2nd Abteilung of the 64th Artillery Regiment	Artillery
	2nd Abteilung of the 78th Artillery Regiment	Artillery
	3rd Abteilung of the 1st Artillery Regiment	Artillery
	3rd Abteilung of the 8th Artillery Regiment	Artillery
	3rd Abteilung of the 9th Artillery Regiment	Artillery
	3rd Abteilung of the 21st Artillery Regiment	Artillery
	3rd Abteilung of the 65th Artillery Regiment	Artillery
	3rd Jäger Battalion of the 15th Infantry Regiment	
	9th Anti-Tank Abteilung	Panzerjäger
	11th Anti-Tank Abteilung	Panzerjäger
	15th Anti-Tank Abteilung	Panzerjäger
	18th Artillery Instrumental Reconnaissance Abteilung	
	21st Anti-Tank Abteilung	Panzerjäger
	28th Artillery Instrumental Reconnaissance Abteilung	
	37th Anti-Tank Abteilung	Panzerjäger
	41st Combat Engineer Battalion	Combat engineers
	42nd Anti-Tank Abteilung	Panzerjäger

== Regimental standards ==
Standard	Military unit	Service branch
	1st Cavalry Regiment (Note: Listed twice in Peredelsky's list, under no. 17 and no. 21.)	
	1st Cavalry Regiment	
	1st Cuirassier Regiment	
	1st Dragoon Regiment	
	1st Uhlan Cavalry Regiment	
	2nd Cavalry Regiment	
	2nd Uhlan Regiment	
	3rd Cavalry Regiment	
	III Group of Zerstörergeschwader 26 "Horst Wessel"	Luftwaffe
	4th Cavalry Regiment (Note: Listed twice in Peredelsky's list, under no. 20 and no. 25.)	
	4th Cavalry Regiment	
Standard of 1813	4th Hussar Regiment	
Standard of 1888	4th Hussar Regiment	
	4th Uhlan Regiment	
	5th Cuirassier Regiment	
	6th Hussar Regiment	
	8th Cavalry Regiment	
	8th Heavy Dragoon Regiment	
	8th Uhlan Cavalry Regiment	
	9th Infantry Cavalry Regiment	
	10th Dragoon Regiment	
	10th Infantry Cavalry Regiment	
	10th Uhlan Regiment	
	11th Infantry Cavalry Regiment	
	12th Light Cavalry Regiment	
	17th Artillery Regiment	

== LSSAH banner staff ==
Standard	Unit	Service branch
	1st SS Panzer Division "Leibstandarte SS Adolf Hitler"	Waffen-SS

== See also ==
- List of Soviet military units that lost their standards in World War II
