= 1945 Moscow Victory Parade =

Parade commemorating Soviet victory against Nazism in 1945

Moscow Victory Parade of 1945, June 24.

The 1945 Moscow Victory Parade (Russian: Парад Победы, romanized: Parad Pobedy), also known as the Parade of Victors (Russian: Парад победителей, romanized: Parad pobediteley), was a victory parade held by the Soviet Armed Forces (with the Color Guard Company representing the First Polish Army) after the defeat of Nazi Germany. This was the longest and largest military parade ever held on Red Square in the Soviet capital Moscow, and involved 40,000 Red Army soldiers, 1,850 military vehicles, and other military hardware. The parade lasted just over two hours on a rainy June 24, 1945, over a month after May 9, the day of Germany's surrender to Soviet commanders.

== Stalin's order for the observance of the parade ==
The parade itself was ordered by Joseph Stalin on June 22, 1945, by virtue of Order 370 of the Office of the Supreme Commander in Chief, Armed Forces of the USSR. This order is as follows:

Order #370 of the Supreme Commander in Chief, Armed Forces of the USSR and concurrent People's Commissar of State for Defense

To mark the victory over Germany in the Great Patriotic War, I order a parade of troops of the Army, Navy and the Moscow Garrison, the Victory Parade, on June 24, 1945, at Moscow's Red Square.

Marching on parade shall be the combined regiments of all the fronts, a People's Commissariat of National Defense combined regiment, the Soviet Navy, military academies and schools, and troops of the Moscow Garrison and Military District.

My deputy, Marshal of the Soviet Union Georgy Zhukov will be the parade inspector. Marshal Konstantin Rokossovsky will command the Victory Parade itself. I entrust to Col. Gen. Pavel Artemyev, the preparations and the supervision of the parade organization, due to his concurrent capacities as the Commanding General of the Moscow Military District and Commanding Officer in charge of the Moscow City Garrison.

June 22, 1945
(signed) MARSHAL OF THE SOVIET UNION JOSEPH V. STALIN
Supreme Commander-in-Chief, Armed Forces of the USSR
And concurrent People's Commissar of Defense of the USSR

This was preceded by another letter by General of the Army Aleksei Antonov, Chief of the General Staff of the Soviet Armed Forces to all the participant fronts in attendance on the 24th of the previous month which is as follows:

Order to the Fronts who will participate in the Victory Parade

The Supreme Commander-in-Chief of the Armed Forces has ordered that:

1. In order for the front to participate in the Moscow City parade in honor of the victory over Germany, each front will be represented by a combined regiment which is to be raised among them.
2. The following pattern will form the combined front regiment as follows:

- 5 two-company battalions with 100 men in the company (10 squads of 10 men each) will be the basis, accompanied by:
  - 19 command staff officers from the front
  - One regimental commander
  - Two deputy regimental commanders for drill and ceremony and political training respectively
  - One regimental chief of staff
  - 5 Battalion commanders
  - 10 company commanders
  - 36 color bearers and 4 escorting officers.

All in all the regiment will be composed of 1,059 male active personnel and 10 additional reserve personnel.
3. A combined regiment for the parade will have the following companies:

- 6 infantry companies
- 1 artillery company
- 1 tank company
- 1 air company
- and 1 combined company (composed of cavalrymen, sappers and signalmen respectively).

4. The companies in attendance will be manned so as to have the middle-ranked officers commanding the squads, which are then composed of privates and sergeants.
5. The combined regiment will be armed in the following pattern on the parade:

- 3 infantry companies with rifles,
- 3 infantry companies with sub-machine guns,
- the artillery company with slung carbines,
- the tank company and the air company both armed with pistols,
- and the combined cavalry, signals and sapper company also with slung carbines and with sabres for the cavalrymen in attendance.

6. The Front Commanders and all commanders including air and tank army commanders will arrive in Moscow for the Parade.
7. On June 10 of this year, the combined regiment of the front will arrive in Moscow having 36 combat colors from selected Front units that are the most distinguished in action, and all the captured enemy standards, whatever the number, selected to be carried in the parade proper.
8. The full dress uniform will be issued in Moscow for use on the parade by the regimental staff.

May 24, 1945
(signed) GENERAL OF THE ARMY ALEKSEI ANTONOV
Chief of the General Staff of the Soviet Armed Forces

=== Parade training ===
Intensive preparations for the parade took place in late May and early June in Moscow. The preliminary rehearsal of the Victory Parade took place at the Central Airfield, and the general rehearsal on Red Square on June 22.

Marshals Georgy Zhukov, who had formally accepted the German surrender to the Soviet Union, and Konstantin Rokossovsky, rode through the parade ground on white and black stallions, respectively. The fact is commemorated by the equestrian statue of Zhukov in front of the State Historical Museum, on Manege Square. Zhukov's stallion was called Кумир ("Idol") while Rokossovsky's was called Столб ("Pole"). The General Secretary of the Communist Party of the Soviet Union, Joseph Stalin, stood atop Lenin's Mausoleum and watched the parade alongside other dignitaries present.

According to certain editions of Zhukov's memoirs, Stalin had intended to ride through the parade himself, but he fell from the horse during the rehearsal and had to yield the honor to Zhukov, who used to be a cavalry officer. However, this story is disputed by former Soviet spy Viktor Suvorov. He claims that the story was inserted into Zhukov's memoirs as a counterargument to his theory, (although it apparently was in circulation earlier) that Stalin didn't lead the parade because he considered the war's results not worthy of the effort invested. Suvorov notes several inconsistencies in the story, along with numerous evidence that Zhukov was intended all along for the role of leading the parade; for example, the memoirs of Sergei Shtemenko, the man responsible at the time for the preparation of the parade, state that the roles were decided from the start, and Igor Bobylev (who took part in the preparations) claims that the story never happened and that Stalin never visited the Manege at that time. Another planned part of the parade was the march of the Victory Banner, which was delivered to Moscow from Berlin on June 20 and was supposed to begin the procession of troops. Despite this, the weak drill training of Mikhail Yegorov, Meliton Kantaria and Stepan Neustroev forced Marshal Zhukov to not go ahead with this portion of the parade.

== The parade ==
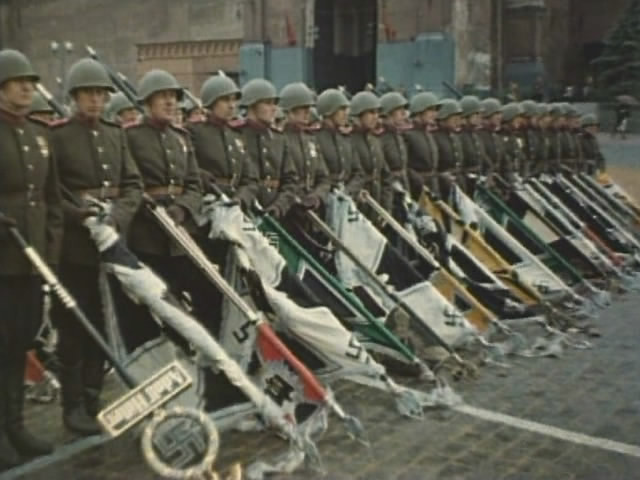
NKVD soldiers carrying the German standards; the LSSAH standard staff is first from left

Displays of the Red Army vehicles were some of the focal points of the ceremony. It was one of the few times in which Cossacks took part in a victory parade, with personnel from the 4th Guards Cossacks Cavalry Corps taking part in the procession of troops as part of the 2nd Ukrainian Front's combined regiment. One of the most famous moments at the end of the troops parade took place when soldiers from the Separate Operational Purpose Division of the NKVD carried the German standards and threw them down next to the mausoleum. One of the standards that was tossed down belonged to the LSSAH, Hitler's personal bodyguard.

The next day, a reception was held in the Grand Kremlin Palace in honor of the participants in the Victory Parade. Due to the bad weather that day the flypast segment and the planned civil parade were cancelled. Nonetheless, this two-hour parade remains the longest and largest military parade in Red Square's history, and involved 40,000 soldiers and 1,850 military vehicles and other military hardware.

=== Band and music ===
The procession had musical accompaniment that was provided by the massed bands of the Moscow Garrison, led by Major General Semyon Tchernetsky, Senior Director of Music. The combined band consisted of 38 military bands coming from Moscow military schools, as well as military units of the Red Army and the NKVD. The combined band numbered 1,220 musicians under the direction of 50 bandmasters. In total, the parade saw the participation of 1,313 musicians, the youngest of whom was 13 years old.

The parade repertoire was finalized for approval on 5 June 1945. The final list included 36 tracks, including the Soviet anthem, fanfares and slow marches. Twenty works that were performed at the parade were written by Tchernetsky himself. The inspection part of the parade commenced with Tchernetsky's Jubilee Slow March "25 Years of the Red Army" and ended with the performance of Slavsya. The first song after the conclusion of the inspection was the Moscow ceremonial fanfare under the direction of conductor Vasily Agapkin. The parade was opened by the young drummers of the Corps of Drums from the Moscow School of Musicians, wearing uniforms similar to those of the Moscow Suvorov Military School and led by a bandmaster, which after marching past soon took its place behind the massed bands to provide additional support. The parade ended with the Glory to the Motherland march. Additional marches have included Jaeger March, March of the 92nd Pechersk Regiment, March of the Leningrad Guards Divisions, March "Joy of Victory", March "Hero".

== Parade participants ==
- Marshal of the Soviet Union Georgy Zhukov (parade inspector)
- Marshal of the Soviet Union Konstantin Rokossovsky (parade commander)
- Military bands

- Massed military bands of the Moscow Military District
  - Conductor: Major Gen. Semyon Tchernetsky, Senior Director of Music of the Central Military Orchestra of the People's Commissariat of National Defense
- Moscow A. Surovov Military Music School Corps of Drums

=== Ground column ===
- Fronts of the Soviet Army, Navy, Army Air Forces and Air Defense Forces composed of:
  - Ground Troops and Air Force officers and personnel of the following fronts:
    - Karelian - led by Regimental Commanders Maj. Gen. Grigory Kalinovsky and Marshal Kirill Meretskov
    - Leningrad - led by Regimental Commanders Maj. Gen. Andrei Stuchenko and Marshal Leonid Govorov
    - 1st Baltic - led by Regimental Commanders Guards Lt. Gen. Anton Lopatin and General of the Army Ivan Bagramyan
    - 3rd Belorussian - led by Regimental Commander Marshal Aleksandr Vasilevsky
    - 2nd Belorussian - led by Regimental Commanders Lt. Gen. Konstantin Erastov and General of the Army Vasily Sokolovsky
    - 1st Belorussian - led by Regimental Commanders Maj. Gen. Ivan Rosly and Col. Gen. Vasily Chuikov
    - 1st Polish Army Color Guard Company led by Chief of the Army General Staff, General Vladislav Korchits (the only foreign army squad invited for the parade)
    - 1st Ukrainian - led by Regimental Commanders Maj. Gen. Gleb Baklanov and Marshal Ivan Konev
    - 4th Ukrainian - led by Regimental Commanders Guards Lt. Gen. Andrei Bondarev and Marshal Fyodor Tolbukhin
    - 2nd Ukrainian - led by Regimental Commanders Lt. Gen. Ivan Afonin and General of the Army Andrey Yeryomenko
    - 3rd Ukrainian - led by Regimental Commanders Guards Maj. Gen. Nikolai Biryukov and Marshal Rodion Malinovsky, and the Commander of Bulgarian 1st Army Lt. Gen Vladimir Stoychev
  - Fleet, Land and Air personnel of the Soviet Navy, under Navy Contingent Commander Vice Adm. Vladimir Fadeev
    - Northern Fleet
    - Baltic Fleet
    - Dnieper Flotilla
    - Danube Flotilla
    - Caspian Flotilla
    - Black Sea Fleet
    - Naval Infantry
    - Coastal Forces (including naval artillery)
    - Combined battalion of the Corps of Cadets, M.V. Frunze Naval College and Naval Engineering Academy
  - Flag Disposal regiment of the 1st Internal Troops Division of the USSR NKVD "Felix Dzerzhinsky" composed of captured enemy standards and colors carried by the fronts
  - Maj. Gen. Mikhail Duka was entrusted with carrying the symbolic key to the defeated city of Berlin
- Moscow Military District, Armed Forces of the Soviet Union contingent under Garrison and District Commander Col. Gen. Pavel Artemyev
  - Military Schools and Academies Combined Joint Division
    - Officers and other ranks of the People's Commisariat of Defense
    - M. V. Frunze Military Academy
    - Suvorov Military School
    - Military Armored Troops Service School
    - Military Engineering Academy
    - F. Dzerzhinsky Military Artillery School
    - Lenin Military-Political Academy
    - Air Force Engineering Academy
    - Moscow City Soviet Border Protection Superior College
    - Moscow Military Infantry Training School
    - Guards Mortars Training School
    - Airborne Troops Officer Candidate School
    - Technical Forces Officer School
  - Infantry Units
    - Kremlin Regiment
    - OMSDON 1st NKVD Internal Troops Mechanized Rifle Division (Special Duties) "Felix Dzerzhinsky"
    - 2nd NKVD Internal Troops Division
  - Border Protection and Security Service of the NKVD
  - K-9 Units (engineering, medical troops, anti-tank)

=== Mounted column ===
- Army Cavalry regiments within the Moscow area
- Army Horse Artillery
  - M1927
  - M1909
  - 152 mm howitzer M1909/30
  - 122 mm howitzer M1910/30 (also used by the regular artillery)
- Tachanka battalion

=== Mobile column ===
- Soviet Air Defence Forces
  - Anti-aircraft guns (towed and truck-mounted)
    - 72-K
    - 61-K
    - 52-K
  - Searchlight trucks
  - Acoustic range finders
- Army Rocket Forces and Field Artillery
  - Mortars
    - 160mm Mortar M1943
    - 120-PM-43 mortar
  - Field guns
    - 76 mm divisional gun M1942 (ZiS-3)
    - 100 mm field gun M1944 (BS-3)
    - 76 mm divisional gun M1936 (F-22)
    - 76 mm regimental gun M1943
    - 85 mm divisional gun D-44
  - Anti-tank guns
    - 53-K
    - M-42
    - ZiS-2
  - Mountain guns
    - 76 mm mountain gun M1938 (also used by the Airborne)
  - Katyusha rocket launchers of the Army Rocket Forces and Artillery
    - BM-8
    - BM-13
    - BM-30/BM-31
  - Howitzers
    - D-1
    - M-10
    - ML-20
    - M-30
    - B-4
    - A-19
    - 152 mm gun M1935 (Br-2)
    - 203 mm howitzer M1931 (B-4)
    - 122 mm howitzer M1910/30
- Army Infantry - joint regiment of motorized infantry formations
  - Dnepr M-72 motorcycles
  - BA-64 armored cars
  - BA-20
- Army Airborne Forces
- Army Tank Forces contingent
  - T-34 (Victory tanks)
  - T-34/85
  - IS-2
  - T-44
  - T-70
- Army Artillery self-propelled artillery contingent
  - SU-76
  - SU-100
  - SU-152
  - ISU-152
  - ISU-122
  - SU-85
  - SU-122

== Foreign delegations ==
Various Allied nations and foreign diplomats were present at the parade. Delegations from Japan (at that time still neutral with the USSR and three months before the Soviets declared war on Japan) were also present at the parade, ironically celebrating the defeat of their former German ally.

== Legacy ==
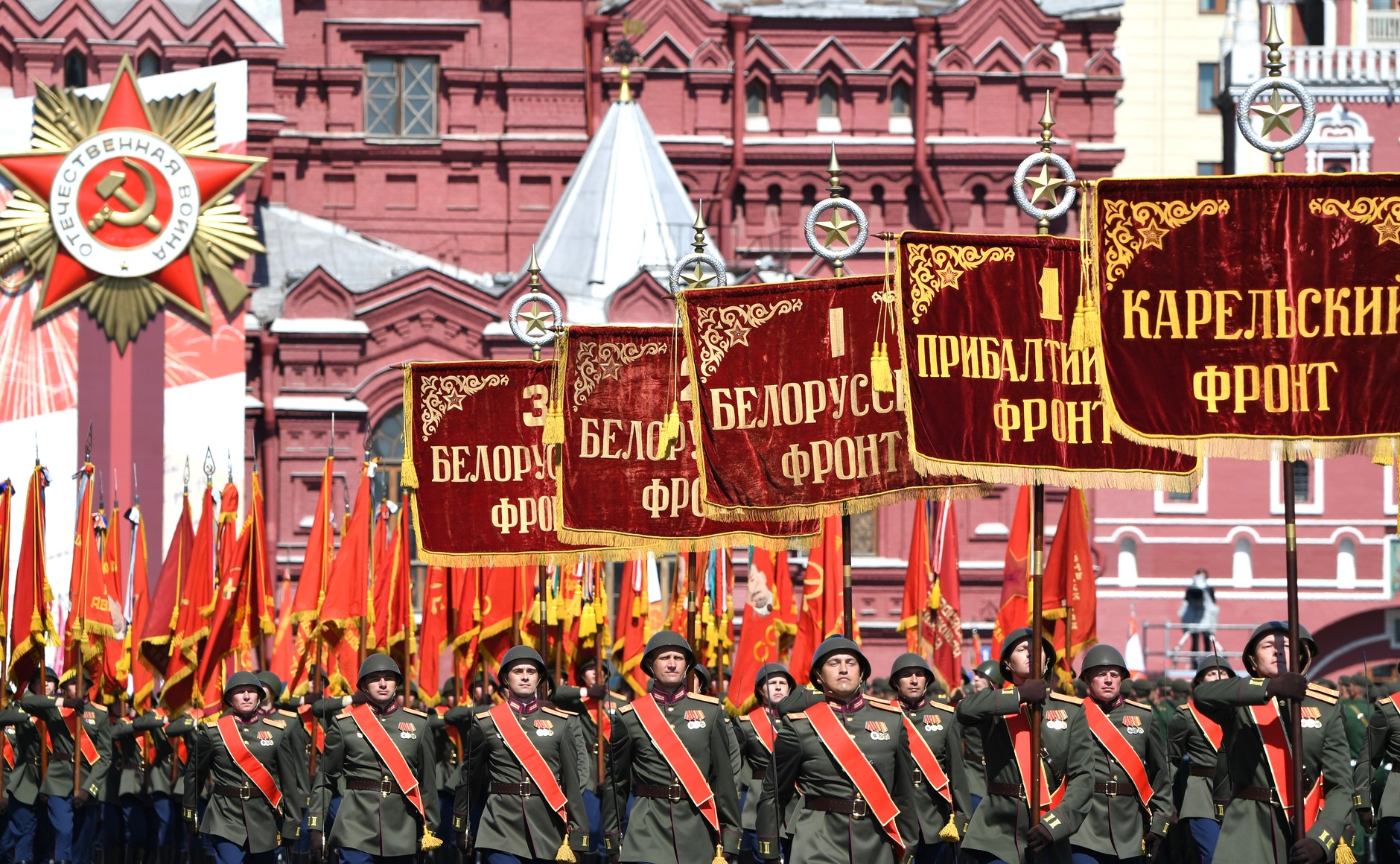
The historical part of the 2020 parade dressed in uniforms dating back to the 1945 parade.

- Outside the 1945 parade, the only parade to be held on 24 June was in 2020 in honor of the 75th anniversary of the victory. Elements of the 1945 parade were included in the 2020 parade, the most notable of which being the bands playing the Jubilee Slow March "25 Years of the Red Army" at the outset of the inspection stage.
- A statue of Zhukov on his parade horse is located near the State Historical Museum on Manezhnaya Square. There was an original debate over where to place the statue, with many saying that it should be located at the site of the parade, Red Square.
- During the 2010 Moscow Victory Day Parade, the contingent from Turkmenistan, upon request from the government of Turkmenistan, was led by an officer riding on horseback, with the horse being a descendant of the horse used during the 1945 parade.
- In 2008, during the celebrations of the Independence Day of South Ossetia, the annual military parade in Tskhinvali saw Georgian flags being thrown to the ground by South Ossetian militiamen, resembling how Soviet soldiers threw German flags on Red Square during the parade of 1945.
- In 2020, during a Victory Parade in the South Ossetian capital of Tskhinvali, equestrian team from the Russian FSB took part, with the equestrian ranks being led by an officer on a stallion called Brilliant, a direct descendant of Idol.
- In the 2017 Moscow Victory Day Parade, officers wore the new standing-collar tunic for the first time, which was supposed to resemble the uniforms officer corps in the 1945 Parade of Victors. At the 2020 parade, the Mongolian contingent wore a modified version of those uniforms and later that year, officers of the Korean People's Army wore uniforms based on those worn at the 1945 parade at a military parade on Kim Il-sung Square.
- In the Kazakh city of Almaty, there is a street near Abay Avenue on called 24 June Street, named in honor of the first Victory Parade.

== See also ==
- List of German standards at the Moscow Victory Parade of 1945
- Berlin Victory Parade of 1945
- London Victory Celebrations of 1946
