= Personal standard of Adolf Hitler =

Adolf Hitler's banner of arms

The standard

The Standard of the Führer (German: Führerstandarte or Standarte des Führers) was a square red banner of arms with a black swastika on a white disc inside a central wreath of golden oak leaves and four Nazi eagles in the corners, associated with the office of the Führer (leader) of Nazi Germany (a title which in practice was only held by Adolf Hitler). It typically indicated the presence of Hitler at official events and was displayed in the form of a hoisted flag, small car flag, and so on.

Hitler introduced the standard after German president Paul von Hindenburg died in August 1934, allowing Hitler to abolish the presidency and claim the title of Führer. Hitler displayed the flag when he assumed supreme command of the Wehrmacht, following the forced resignation of Werner von Blomberg, Minister of War and Commander-in-Chief of the Wehrmacht, in 1938.

The LSSAH banner, which was mistaken by the Soviets to be Hitler's standard

The personal standards of Hitler were manufactured in various sizes. Some were not flown but were hung or displayed in interior venues like the opera or at Nazi Party Day. The standard was also embossed on teaspoons from the mess hall dining sets of Führerbegleitbrigade. The standard was similar to the banner of the 1st SS Panzer Division "Leibstandarte SS Adolf Hitler" (LSSAH), which had minor differences. (Note: In the Leibstandarte flag, all four eagles clutch wreaths surrounding swastikas and have outstretched wings; in the personal standard, the upper right and lower left eagles are missing the wreath and have partly folded wings.) After Soviet troops captured one LSSAH banner staff in 1945, the trophy has been confused with Hitler's personal standard at the 1945 Moscow Victory Parade.

Until 2024, it was believed that none of the actual standards survived. In December 2024, the National Museum in Poznań, Poland, announced they discovered that a Nazi banner that was kept in the museum since the 1960s was in fact Hitler's personal standard. The banner was found in Poznań opera hall in the 1960s and was probably placed there during World War II in case Hitler decided to visit. The museum told the Polish Press Agency that they have no plans to exhibit the standard soon as it is "so strongly associated with Hitler that it could become an object of neo-Nazi worship" and if any display of the standard takes place it "should be very well thought out" to prevent that.

== Displays ==
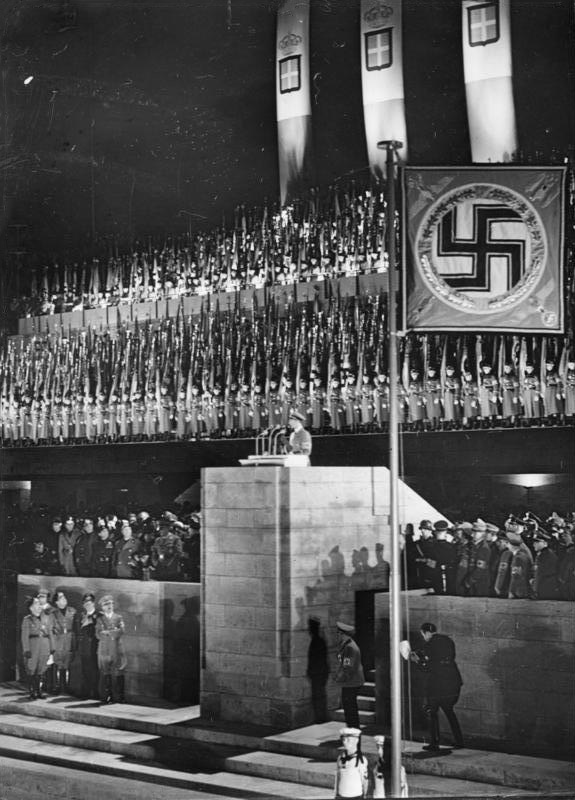
In Berlin in 1937

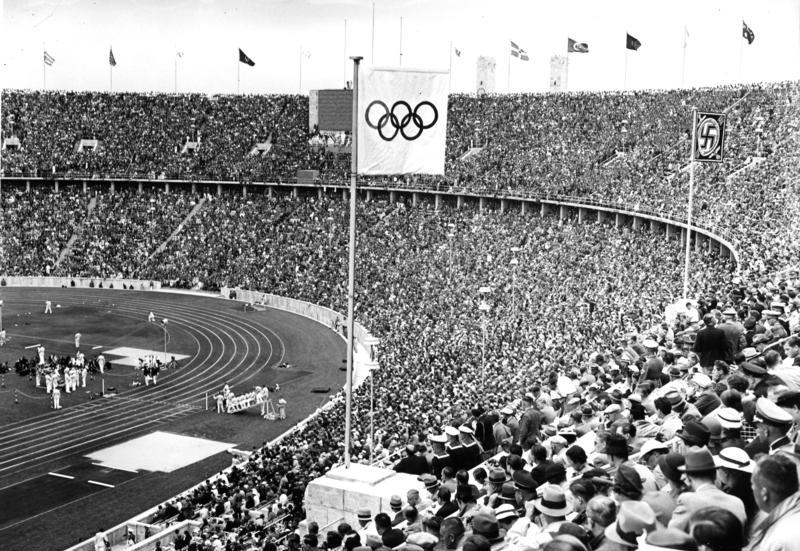
At the 1936 Summer Olympics, to the right

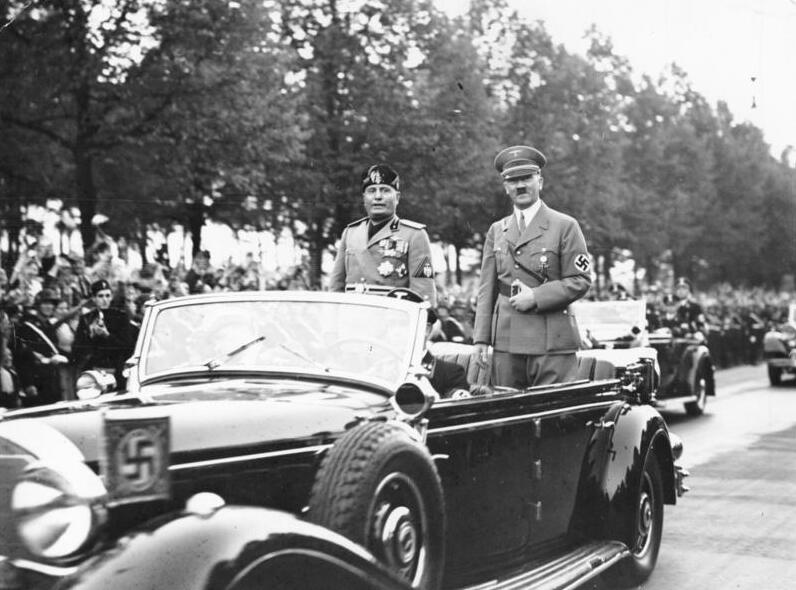
On a car

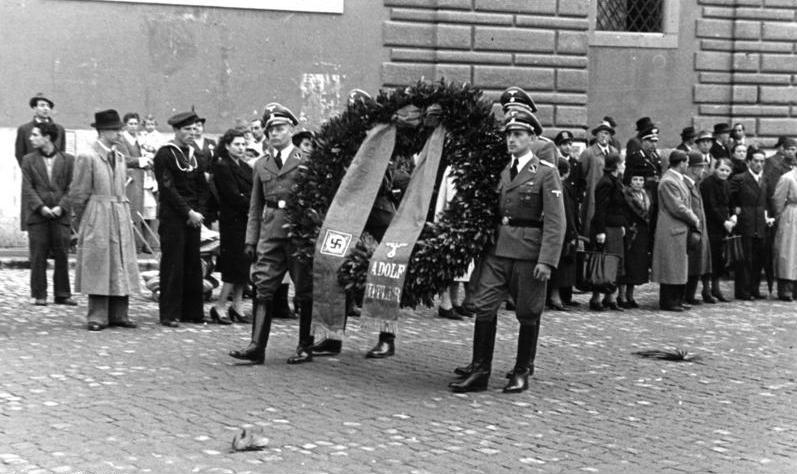
On a funeral sash
