= List of flags of the Luftwaffe (1933–1945) =

This is a list of flags of the German Luftwaffe which were used in the years between 1933 and 1945. Most were based on the Prussian infantry regimental flags.

== Supreme Commander of the Luftwaffe ==
Since the beginning of the Luftwaffe, Hermann Göring was its designated head. In 1933 he was called Reichsminister der Luftfahrt (Reich Minister for Aviation), when on 26 February 1935, he was instituted as Commander-in-Chief of the Luftwaffe. He held this title until April 1945, when he was dismissed by Adolf Hitler and replaced by Robert Ritter von Greim.

| Flag | Date | Designation | Description |
|---|---|---|---|
| | 1933–1935 | The command flag for the Reich Minister for Aviation (left side) | The flag was introduced on 5 May 1933. Placed in the centre of the flag was the variant of the German eagle, that was used until 1935 as the national emblem. This flag was probably used until April 1935 when the following alternative pattern exclusively came into use. |
| | 1933–1935 | The command flag for the Reich Minister for Aviation (right side) | The reverse side was the same as the obverse but with inverted symbols. Just like on the left side, suspended from the base of the wreath was a representation of the Pour le Mérite decoration. |
| | 1933–1935 | The command flag for the Reich Minister for Aviation (left side), alternative pattern | This was an alternative variant of the command flag that was probably used during the same time as the previous one. Since April 1935 this flag was called "Command flag for the Reich Minister for Aviation and Supreme Commander of the Luftwaffe." |
| | 1933–1935 | The command flag for the Reich Minister for Aviation (right side), alternative pattern | This is the presumptive appearance of the right side of the flag. Because there is no image available of the reverse side, this is a reconstruction. It is assumed that the right side was made in a similar style like the first pattern. |
| | 1935–1938 | The command flag for the Reich Minister for Aviation and Commander-in-Chief of the German Air Force (left side) | Introduced in the end of the year 1935 the new model of the flag displayed the symbol of the German Luftwaffe, a flying golden eagle, in the four corners of the flag. The golden border of the flag contained 76 small swastikas. |
| | 1935–1938 | The command flag for the Reich Minister for Aviation and Commander-in-Chief of the German Air Force (right side) | The reverse side of the flag was the same as the obverse, but with inverted symbols. In addition, there was a representation of the Pour le Mérite decoration. |
| | 1938–1945 (de facto until 1940) | The Command flag for the Reich Minister for Aviation and Commander-in-Chief of the German Air Force (left side) | Identical to the previous version |
| | 1938–1945 (de facto until 1940) | The Command flag for the Reich Minister for Aviation and Commander-in-Chief of the German Air Force (right side) | This flag was introduced on 28 April 1938. The right side was identical to the previous version, except for an added pair of Luftwaffe field marshal's batons. The change of the flag took place at the same time as the promotion of Göring to Generalfeldmarschall (field marshal). |
| | 1940–1941 | Standard for the Reichsmarschall (left side) | Shortly after Göring was promoted to Reichsmarschall on 19 July 1940, he had himself manufactured a personal standard. In practice this standard most likely was also used as Command flag for the Supreme Commander of the Luftwaffe and de facto replaced the previous command flag. This fact is observable in some contemporary pictures. |
| | 1940–1941 | Standard for the Reichsmarschall (right side) | Placed in the centre of the right side of the standard there was the Großkreuz des Eisernen Kreuzes, a decoration which was uniquely awarded to Göring. |
| | 1941–1945 | Standard for the Reichsmarschall (left side) | The new version of the standard was introduced in February 1941 and shows in the centre the Reichsadler (National Eagle) in a revised design. |
| | 1941–1945 | Standard for the Reichsmarschall (right side) | The Großkreuz now is surrounded by a wreath of laurel leaves. |

== Other rank and command flags ==
| Flag | Date | Designation | Description |
|---|---|---|---|
| | 1937(?)–1945 | Command flag for the Secretary of State for Aviation | Erhard Milch held this position from 1933 to 1945. In 1938 he was additionally instituted as Generalinspekteur der Luftwaffe. |
| | 1937–1940 | Command flag for the Chief of the Air Force General Staff | Introduced on 1 September 1937, abolished on 13 July 1940. The last chief of staff was Hans Jeschonnek. He committed suicide on 19 August 1943. |
| | 1940–1944 | Service flag for the Generalluftzeugmeister | Introduced on 13 July 1940, abolished on 20 June 1944. Milch held this position during the whole period. |
| | 1937(?)–1940 | Flag for an air fleet commander and Commander "East" | |
| | 1940–1945 | Flag for an air fleet commander | |
| | 1937(?)–1945 | Flag for a commanding general of the Luftwaffe | |
| | 1937(?)–1945 | Flag for the commander of a Luftgau or a Fliegerdivision, leader of naval air force units | |
| | 1941–1945 | Flag for field marshals of the air force (right side) | Introduced on 17 February 1941. This flag and the following ones were so called Hoheitszeichen (national emblems). In case there was a command flag in use, these national emblems had to be applied as well. |
| | 1941–1945 | Flag for field marshals of the air force (left side) | |
| | 1941–1945 | Vehicle flag for commanding generals of the Luftwaffe | National emblems were exclusively used as vehicle flags. |
| | 1941–1945 | Vehicle pennant for generals of the Luftwaffe | |
| | 1941–1945 | Vehicle pennant for remaining members of the Luftwaffe | |
| | 1936–1945 | Flag for air force flying (Fliegende Verbände) Units, technical, and aerial warfare schools | |
| | 19...–1942 | Command pennant for a flying unit detachment | |
| | 1936–1945 | Flag for anti-aircraft artillery (Flak-Artillerie) units and schools | |
| | 19...–1942 | Command pennant for an anti-aircraft detachment (Flak-Abteilung) | |
| | 1936–1945 | Flag for air force signal (Nachrichtenverbände) units and schools | |
| | 1936–1945 | Standard of II. Bataillon - Fallschirmjäger-Regiment 1 | |
| | 1938–1945 | Flag of III. Bataillon - Fallschirmjäger-Regiment 1 | |
| | 1935–1942 | Flag of I. Bataillon - Regiment "General Göring" | |
| | 1936–1939 | The honour standard of Legion Condor, German air volunteers in the Spanish Civil War | |
| | 1933–1945 | German Air Sports Association (Deutscher Luftsportverband, or DLV) | |

== Literature ==
- Davis, Brian Leigh (1984). Flags & standards of the Third Reich: Army, navy, & air force, 1933-1945. Arco Pub. ISBN 978-0668036207.
- Oberkommando der Kriegsmarine (1992). Das große Flaggenbuch (in German). Mauritius Buch Verlag. ISBN 978-3980334204.
