= List of German flags =

This list of German flags details flags and standards that have been or are currently used by Germany between 1848 and the present.

== National flags ==
Flag	Date	Use	Description
	1949–present	National and merchant flag (Bundes- und Handelsflagge)	A tricolour, made of three equal horizontal bands coloured black (top), red, and gold (bottom).
	1950–present	State flag and ensign (Bundesdienstflagge) and military flag (Kriegsflagge). This flag may only be used by federal government authorities.	Variant of the coat of arms of Germany) in the centre. The flag was originally used 1921–1933 in the Weimar Republic. While identical in heraldic terms to the original Weimar era flag, the modern exact design is slightly simplified.
		National flag with coat of arms (Bundesflagge mit Bundeswappen). Unofficial version, the private use of which is not penalized.	
	1997–present	Hanging national flag (Bannerflagge)	
	1996–present	Hanging state flag	

== Standards ==
=== Presidential standard ===
Flag	Date	Use	Description
	1921–1926; since 1950	Standard of the president of Germany	The standard depicts the elements of the coat of arms. A version of the standard that is identical in heraldic terms, but with a slightly different exact design, was used 1926–1933.
	1933–1935 (de facto up to 1934)	Standard of the president	
	1926–1933	Standard of the president	
	1919–1921	Flag of the president	
	1955–1960	Standard of the president of East Germany	
	1953–1955	Standard of the president of East Germany	
	1951–1953	Standard of the president of East Germany	
	1950–1951	Standard of the president of East Germany	
	1949–1950	Standard of the president of East Germany	
	1960–1990	Standard of the president of the State Council	
	1935–1945	Standard of the Führer	

=== Imperial family standards ===
Flag	Date	Use	Description
	1871–1888	German Emperor's standard	
	1888–1918	German Emperor's standard	
	1871–1901	Empress Augusta and Empress Victoria's standard	
	1888–1918	Empress Augusta Viktoria's standard	
	1871–1888	Standard of the Crown Prince	
	1888–1918	Standard of the Crown Prince	
	1519–1556	Another imperial banner of Charles V	A black double-headed eagle with an escutcheon of the coat of arms of Charles V on a yellow field.
	1493–1556	Banner of Maximilian I. Charles V continued using this banner.	A black double-headed eagle with the combined arms of Austria and Burgundy on a yellow field
	1437–1493	Banner of Emperor Frederick III	A black double-headed eagle with the coat of arms of Austria on a yellow field
	c. 1430–1806	Banner of the Holy Roman Emperor and state flag of the HRE	A black double-headed eagle with haloes on a yellow field
	c. 1430–1806	Another banner of the Holy Roman Emperor and state flag of the HRE	A black double-headed eagle without haloes on a yellow field
	800–1401	Banner of the Emperor of the Romans and of the King of Germany	An Imperial Eagle displayed with a halo sable armed and langued gules

=== Other standards ===
Flag	Date	Use	Description
	1871–1918	Royal standard of the Emperor of Germany in Prussia (King of Prussia)	On a red field, an Iron Cross is shown. In the centre of the Iron Cross, the Imperial Eagle with a crown right on top of the eagle is shown. Around the eagle and crown, words spell the phrase: Gott mit uns, meaning: "God with us".
	1844–1871	Old royal standard of the Emperor of Germany in Prussia (King of Prussia)	
	1871–1892	Royal standard of the Crown Prince of Prussia	The same as the previous flag, but on a white field, instead of a red one.
	1835–1918	Royal standard of the King of Bavaria	
	1903–1918	Royal standard of the Grand Duke of Hesse	
	1903–1918	Royal standard of the Grand Duchess of Hesse	
	?–1918	Princely standard of Prince Reuss of Greiz	
	?–1918	Standard of the Duke of Saxe-Coburg-Gotha	Featured the flag of the British royal family until George V's decision to change the house into Windsor.
	1911–1918	Princely standard of Schaumburg-Lippe	
	1816–1837	Royal standard of the Kingdom of Hanover	Flag of the King of Great Britain in Hannover until Queen Victoria.

== Military ==
=== German Navy ===
Flag	Date	Use	Description
Ensigns
	1956–	War ensign and jack (Seekriegsflagge und Gösch) of the German Navy	A swallowtail variant of the state flag
	1960–1990	Naval ensign (Seekriegsflagge) of the Volksmarine	
	1938–1945	Naval ensign of the Kriegsmarine	
	1935–1938	Naval ensign of the Kriegsmarine	
	1933–1935	Reich war flag (Reichskriegsflagge) and marine jack	
	1921–1933	Reich war flag (Reichskriegsflagge)	
	1919–1921 (never used)	Reich war flag (Reichskriegsflagge)	
	1903–1918 (1921)	Reich war flag	
	1892–1903	Reich war flag (Reichskriegsflagge)	
	1867–1892	Imperial Navy war ensign (Kriegsflagge)	
	1848–1852	War ensign of the Reichsflotte	
	1895–1918	Naval ensign of the Prussian Navy	
	1819–1895	Naval ensign of the Prussian Navy	
	1816–1819	Naval ensign of the Prussian Navy	
	12th century	Naval ensign of the State of the Teutonic Order	
	1650–1694	Naval ensign of the Brandenburg Navy	
	15th century	War flag of the Holy Roman Empire	Red swords crossed on top of one another on a field. The top of the field is black and the bottom of the field is white.
	15th century	War flag of the Holy Roman Empire	A square flag depicting a black eagle on a yellow field with a red bar on top
	c. 12th – early 14th centuries	War flag of the Holy Roman Empire	A non-rectangular flag depicting a white cross on a red field
Jacks
	1956–	War ensign and jack (Seekriegsflagge und Gösch) of the German Navy	A swallowtail variant of the state flag
	1935–1945	Jack of the Kriegsmarine	
	1933–1935	Jack of the Kriegsmarine	
	1921–1933	Marine jack (Kriegsgösch)	
	1903–1918 (1921)	Marine jack (Kriegsgösch)	
	1867–1903	Marine jack (Kriegsschiffgösch)	
	1848–1852	Jack of the Reichsflotte	
Other
	1945–1947	Flag of the German Mine Sweeping Administration	The signal pennant "8"

== Military and state flags ==
Flag	Date	Use	Description
		Standard of the chancellor of Germany	A square variant of the Bundesdienstflagge with red border.
	1957–	Standard of the inspector general of the Bundeswehr	
	1964–	Troop colour (Truppenfahne) of the Bundeswehr	A variant of the Kriegsflagge with aspect ratio of 1:1.
	1950–1994	Flag of the Deutsche Bundespost	
	1950–1994	Flag of the minister of the Deutsche Bundespost	
	1950–1994	Flag of the president of the Deutsche Bundespost	A swallowtail variant of the postal flag
	1950–1994	Flag of the state secretary of the Deutsche Bundespost	

== Non-Governmental flags ==
Flag	Date	Use	Description
	1933–1943	Flag of the Kyffhäuserbund	The red square with an iron cross and a Kyffhäuser Monument

== Civil ensign ==
Flag	Date	Use	Description
	1949–present	Merchant flag	A tricolour, made of three equal horizontal bands coloured black (top), red, and gold (bottom).
	1973–1990	Merchant flag of the German Democratic Republic (Handelsflagge)	Tricolour of black, red, and yellow (same as West German colours), but bears the coat of arms of East Germany, consisting of a compass and a hammer encircled with rye
	1959–1973	Merchant flag of the German Democratic Republic (Handelsflagge)	
	1946–1950	"C-Pennant" (C-Doppelstander) (provisional civil ensign)	Used during the Occupation Period to identify German ships according to international law.
	1935–1945	Merchant flag of the German Reich variant with the Iron Cross	
	1933–1935	Merchant flag of the German Reich (Handelsflagge)	A red field, with a white disc with a black swastika at a 45-degree angle. Disc and swastika are exactly in the centre.
	1933–1935	Merchant flag of the German Reich variant with the Iron Cross (Eisernes Kreuz)	
	1933–1935	Merchant flag of the German Reich (Handelsflagge)	Black, white, and red horizontal tricolour. Used in conjunction with the Parteiflagge.
	1921–1933	Merchant flag of the Weimar Republic variant with the Iron Cross (Eisernes Kreuz)	
	1919–1933	Merchant flag of the Weimar Republic (Handelsflagge)	
	1896–1918	Merchant flag variant with the Iron Cross (Eisernes Kreuz)	
	1871–1918	Merchant flag of the German Empire (National- und Handelsflagge)	
	?–1918	Merchant flag of Mecklenburg-Schwerin	
	?–1864	Merchant flag of the Duchy of Holstein	
	1816–1837	Merchant flag of the Kingdom of Hanover	

== German Scouting flags ==
Flag	Date	Use	Description
	?–present	Flag of the German Association of Guides and Scouts	
	1965–present	Flag of the Deutsche Pfadfinderschaft Sankt Georg	
	1931–1965	Old flag of the Deutsche Pfadfinderschaft Sankt Georg	
	1973–present	Flag of the Verband Christlicher Pfadfinder*innen	White logo on a blue background.

=== Other youth organisations ===
Flag	Date	Use	Description
	1946–1989	Flag of the Free German Youth	
	1948–1990	Flag and pennant of the Ernst Thälmann Pioneer Organisation	
	1955–1994	Wiking-Jugend	
	1932–1945	Flag and pennant of the Deutsches Jungvolk	
	1926–1945	Flags and pennant of the Hitlerjugend	
	1926–1935	Pennants of the Hitlerjugend	
	1935–1945	Pennant of the League of German Girls	
	1904–present	Socialist Youth of Germany – Falcons	

== Sport flags ==
Flag	Date	Use	Description
	1956, 1960 and 1964	Flag of the United Team of Germany at the Olympics	
	1952–1990	Flag of the Gesellschaft für Sport und Technik	
	1957–1990	Flag of the Deutscher Turn- und Sportbund	
	1936–1945	Flag of the Sports Office of the Third Reich	
	1934–1945	Flag of the Deutsche Jägerschaft	
	1930's–1945	Flag of the German Bicycle Union	

Pennant for the German Bicycle Union (1933–1945)

Pennant for The German Car Club (1933–1945)

Pennant for the General German Car Club (1953)

Pennant for the German Aeronautic Union (1933–1937)

Pennant for the German Canoeing Association (2008–present)

== Vexillology Associations flags ==
Flag	Date	Use	Description
	1995–present	Flag of the German Vexillological Association	
		Flag of the World Vexillological Research Institute	

== Flags of German municipalities ==
Most municipalities have unique flags. Like state flags, most of them are with either a bicolour or tricolour stipes with or without the emblem ("wappen").

== Unofficial regional flags ==
Flag	Date	Use	Description
	1952–present	Flags of Baden	A horizontal triband of yellow and red.
	1952–present	Flags of Baden	A horizontal bicolour of red and yellow.
	1990's–present	Flag of Franconia	
	1952–present	Flag of Mecklenburg	
	1816–present	Flag of Palatinate	
	1945–present	Flag of Pomerania	
	?–present	Flag of Westphalia	
	1945–present	Flag of Württemberg	

== Political flags ==
Flag	Date	Party	Description
current
	Since 1991	Social Democratic Party of Germany	
	Since 2023	Christian Democratic Union of Germany	
	Since 2016	Christian Social Union in Bavaria	
	Since 2015	Free Democratic Party	
	1952–1968	Free Democratic Party	
	Since 1993	Alliance 90/The Greens	"New" flag from 2023 with a change of colours to a darker shade of green and a slightly desaturated yellow.
	Since 2021	Alternative for Germany	
	Since 2007	Die Linke	
	Since 2004	South Schleswig Voters' Association	
	Since 2013	National Democratic Party of Germany	
	1964–?	National Democratic Party of Germany	Still appearing in street demonstrations.
	Since 2013	The III. Path	
	Since 2022	Ecological-Left Liberal Democratic Party	
	Since 2011	Marxist–Leninist Party of Germany	
	Since 2005	Bergpartei, die "ÜberPartei"	
	Since 2004	Front Deutscher Äpfel	
	Since 2000s	Identitarian movement	
	Since 1990	Communist Party of Germany	
	Since 2021	Free Saxony	
former
	2012–2025	The Right – Party for Referendum, Sovereignty and Homeland Protection	
	1998–2005	Deutsche Heidnische Front	
	1979–1995	Free German Workers' Party	
	1977–1983	Action Front of National Socialists/National Activists	
	1968–1986	Communist Party of Germany/Marxists–Leninists	
	1949–1952	Socialist Reich Party	
	1943–1945	National Committee for a Free Germany	Also used the Flag of Germany (1867–1918) without the heading
	1930–1933	Black Front	
	1870–1933	Centre Party	Used before the Nazi period.
	1920–1924	Union of Upper Silesians	
	1920–1945	National Socialist German Workers' Party	
	1919–1946	Communist Party of Germany (obverse and reverse)	
	1918–1933	German National People's Party	Flag of Germany (1867–1918)
East Germany
	1946–1989	Socialist Unity Party of Germany	
	1945–1990	Christian Democratic Union	
	1945–1990	Liberal Democratic Party of Germany	
	1948–1990	Democratic Farmers' Party of Germany	
	1948–1990	National Democratic Party of Germany	
	1945–present	People's Solidarity	
	1945–1994	Peasants Mutual Aid Association	
	1947–1990	Democratic Women's League of Germany	
	?–1990	Cultural Association of the GDR	
other
	1990s–present	Antifa	
	1933–1935	Der Stahlhelm, Bund der Frontsoldaten	
	1918–1933	Der Stahlhelm, Bund der Frontsoldaten	
	1932	Iron Front's anti-Nazi demonstration flag	
	1928–1933	Rural People's Movement	
	1919–1921	Freikorps Roßbach	

== Religious flags ==
Flag	Date	Use	Description
		Flag of Evangelical Church in Germany	
former
	1990s–2000s	Flag of Heathen Front	
	1932–1945	Flag of German Christians (movement)	
	1900–c.1938	Flag of Order of the New Templars	Golden background as a symbol of eternity, lilies as a symbol of (racial) purity, and the red swastika as a symbol of growing arioheroism.
	1871–1918	Old Church pennant	

== Ethnic groups flags ==
Flag	Date	Use	Description
	1989–present	Flag of East Frisians	
	2004–present	Flag of North Frisians	
		Flag of Plattdeutsch-speaking Germans	
	1848–present	Flag of Sorbs	Official in Saxony.
	1955–present	Flag of South Schleswig Danes	
		Flag of Yenish people	
	1829–1945	Flag of Masurians	

== Historical flags ==
=== Francia, Kingdom of Germany, and the Holy Roman Empire (800–1806) ===
Flag	Date	Use	Description
	c. 9th century	Imperial Oriflamme of Charlemagne.	A three-pointed green banner with eight golden crosses and six flowers.
	c. 12th–early 14th centuries	War flag of the Holy Roman Empire	A non-rectangular flag depicting a white cross on a red field
	1400–1523	Imperial Pavilion of Holy Roman Empire	A flag depicting a black eagle on a yellow field
	1400s	War flag of the Holy Roman Empire	Red swords crossed on top of one another on a field. The top of the field is black and the bottom of the field is white.

=== Teutonic Order State and Prussia (1226–1935) ===
Flag	Date	Use	Description
	1226–1525	Flag of the Teutonic Order State	A black cross on a white field.
	1466–1772	Flag of Royal Prussia	
	1525–1701	Flag of Ducal Prussia	
	1701–1750	First flag of the Kingdom in Prussia	A black eagle holding a rod and orb on a white field, a crown on top
	1701–1935	Civil flag of Prussia	A bicolour design – black and white, split horizontally.
	1750–1801	Second flag of the Kingdom in Prussia and first flag of the Kingdom of Prussia	A black eagle holding a sword and rod on a white field, a crown on top
	1801–1803	Second flag of the Kingdom of Prussia	
	1803–1892	Third flag of the Kingdom of Prussia	The same as the previous flag, but the crown in the top of the flag is smaller.
	1816	War flag of Prussia	A smaller black crowned eagle with yellow arm plates, a rod and orb, all on a white field with an Iron Cross in the upper hoist corner
	1892–1918	Fourth flag of the Kingdom of Prussia	
	1895–1918	War flag of Prussia	A non-rectangular flag depicting an Imperial Eagle in the centre of a white field, and in the upper hoist corner, an Iron Cross is shown.
	1918–1933	Flag of the Free State of Prussia	
	1933–1935	Service flag of the Free State of Prussia	The same as the previous flag, but the phrase Gott mit uns reappears, and the eagle is holding a sword and two lightning bolts. The eagle also has a National Socialist swastika on the chest.

=== German Confederation (1815–1866) ===
Flag	Date	Use	Description
	1848–1866	Flag of the German Confederation, used in 1848–1849 and again in 1863–1866. First appeared within the Fürstentum Reuß-Greiz after 12 May 1778 (4:5 aspect ratio)	Also used by the Empire of Germany (1848–1849)

=== North German Confederation (1867–1871) ===
Flag	Date	Use	Description
	1867–1871	National and merchant flag (National- und Handelsflagge)	A tricolour, made of three equal horizontal bands coloured black (top), white, and red (bottom)

=== German Empire (1871–1918) ===
Flag	Date	Use	Description
	1871–1918	National and merchant flag (National- und Handelsflagge)	
	1884–1918	Colonial flag	
	1903–1919	War Ensign (Reichskriegsflagge)	

=== Weimar Republic (1919–1933) ===
Flag	Date	Use	Description
	1919–1933	National flag (Nationalflagge)	
	1921–1933	State flag (Dienstflagge zu Land)	
	1921–1926	State ensign (Dienstflagge zur See)	
	1926–1933	State ensign (Dienstflagge zur See)	
	1919–1921	Flag of Defence Minister	
	1921–1933	Flag of Defence Minister	

=== Nazi Germany (1933–1945) ===
The flag with the swastika and white disc centered was used throughout (1920–1945) as the NSDAP flag (Parteiflagge). Between 1933 and 1935, it was used as the mandatory party flag with the national black-white-red horizontal tricolour last used (up to 1918) by the German Empire. In 1935, the black-white-red horizontal tricolour was scrapped again, and the flag with the off-centre swastika and disc was instituted as the only national flag (and was to remain as such until 1945). The flag with the centered disc only continued to be used as the Parteiflagge after 1935.

Flag	Date	Use	Description
Flags used 1933–1935
	1920–1945	NSDAP flag (Parteiflagge)	A red field, with a white disc with a black swastika at a 45-degree angle. Disc and swastika are exactly in the centre.
	1933–1935	National flag (Nationalflagge); Merchant flag (Handelsflagge)	Black, white, and red horizontal tricolour. Used in conjunction with the Parteiflagge.
	1933–1935	Merchant flag variant with the Iron Cross (Eisernes Kreuz)	
	1933	Reich service flag (Reichsdienstflagge) of the Wehrmacht	
	1933–1935	Reich service flag	
	1933–1935	Flag of the Minister of Defence	
Flags used 1935–1945
	1935–1945	National flag	A red field, with a white disc with a black swastika at a 45-degree angle. Disk and swastika are slightly off-centre.
	1935–1945	Marine jack (Gösch)	A red field, with a white disc with a black swastika at a 45-degree angle. Disk and swastika are slightly off-centre.
	1935–1945	Merchant ensign (Reichshandelsflagge)	A red field, with a white disc with a black swastika at a 45-degree angle. Disk and swastika are slightly off-centre.
	1933–1945	Banner (Bannerflagge) of Germany	Banners were of various lengths, which were hung vertically on public buildings.
	1933–1945	Banner (Bannerflagge) for the Schutzstaffel	Banners that were also used by the national socialists (very rarely) along with the swastika.
	1935–1945	Merchant flag variant with the Iron Cross	
	1935–1945	Reich service flag (Reichsdienstflagge)	
	1935–1938	Flag of the Wehrmacht Commander in Chief (replaced the Minister of Defence)	
	1935–1938	Kriegsmarine, Heer, Luftwaffe	
	1938–1945	Kriegsmarine, Heer, Luftwaffe	
	1935–1945	Schutzstaffel (SS)	
	1921–1945	Sturmabteilung (SA)	
	1935–1945	National Socialist Motor Corps (NSKK)	
	1936–1945	Flag of the Ordnungspolizei (OrPo) ("Order Police", the national regular police organization of National Socialist Germany)	

=== World War II aftermath in Germany ===
Allied Control Council (1945–1949) and Saar Protectorate

Flag	Date	Use	Description
	1946–1949	"C-Pennant" (C-Doppelstander) (provisional civil ensign)	Used during the Occupation Period to identify German ships according to international law.
	1947–1956	Flag of Saar Protectorate	Flag of Saarland which was given by French Government. At this time period the Saar was a satellite state of France.

=== East Germany (1949–1990) ===
Flag	Date	Use	Description
	1949–1959	Civil ensign (Zivilflagge)	
	1959–1990	State flag (Staatsflagge)	Tricolour of black, red, and yellow (same as West German colours), but bears the coat of arms of East Germany, consisting of a compass and a hammer encircled with rye
	1973–1990	Merchant flag (Handelsflagge)	Tricolour of black, red, and yellow (same as West German colours), but bears the coat of arms of East Germany, consisting of a compass and a hammer encircled with rye
	1963–1990	Hanging state flag (Bannerflagge)	
	1955–1973	Flag of East German Post	
	1975–1990	Flag of East German Post	
	1960–1990	Flag of the National People's Army (Nationale Volksarmee or NVA)	
	1960–1990	Regimental colours (Truppenfahne) of Nationale Volksarmee	
	1962–1990	Flag of boats of the Border Troops	

=== Baden-Württemberg ===
==== Baden ====
Flag	Date	Use	Description
	1891–1918	Flag of the Grand Duchy of Baden	
	1862–1891	Flag of the Grand Duchy of Baden	
	1855–1862	Flag of the Grand Duchy of Baden	
	1848–1855	Flag of the Grand Duchy of Baden	
	1803–1848	Flag of the Electorate of Baden and the Grand Duchy of Baden	
	medieval–1803	Banner of the Margraviate of Baden	

==== Hohenzollern-Hechingen and Hohenzollern-Sigmaringen ====
Flag	Date	Use	Description
	1576–1850	Flag of the Hohenzollern-Hechingen and Hohenzollern-Sigmaringen	

==== Leyen ====
Flag	Date	Use	Description
	1806–1814	Flag of the Principality of Leyen	
	until 1798	Flag of the County of Adendorf	

==== Württemberg ====
Flag	Date	Use	Description
	1817–1918	Flag of Kingdom of Württemberg	
	1803–1816	Flag of Electorate of Württemberg and the first flag of the Kingdom of Württemberg	
	medieval–1803	Banner of Duchy of Württemberg	

=== Bavaria ===
==== Bavaria ====
Flag	Date	Use	Description
	1945–1949	Flag of American occupation zone in Germany	Flag of the United States
	1918	Flag of Bavarian Soviet Republic	Red flag
	1805–1918	Flag of Kingdom of Bavaria	
	1623–1806	Banner of Electorate of Bavaria	
	1505–1623	Banner of Duchy of Bavaria	
	1392–1505	Banner of Bavaria-Munich	
	1353–1392	Banner of Bavaria-Landshut	

==== Other countries in today's Bavarian lands ====
Flag	Date	Use	Description
	1105–1191	Banner of Burgraviate of Nuremberg under the Raabs	
	1398–1791	Hohenzollern banner of Principalitys of Ansbach and Bayreuth	
	1803–1810	Flag of Principality of Regensburg	
	1805–1814	Flag of Grand Duchy of Würzburg	

=== Brandenburg ===
Flag	Date	Use	Description
	1660–1750	Flag of Margraviate of Brandenburg	
	c. 1684	Flag of Margraviate of Brandenburg	
	1340–1657	Banner of Margraviate of Brandenburg-Küstrin	

=== East Frisia ===
Flag	Date	Use	Description
	?–1835	Flag of Lordship of Kniphausen^{de}	
	1702–1751	Flag of Lordship of Kniphausen	
	1689–1702	Banner of Lordship of Kniphausen	

=== Hesse ===
Flag	Date	Use	Description
	1919–1923	Flag of Free State of Bottleneck	
	1806–1918	Flag of Grand Duchy of Hesse	
	1806–1866	Flag of Duchy of Nassau	
	?–1806	Flag of Nassau-Usingen	
	?–1866	Flag of Free City of Frankfurt	
	1810–1813	Flag of Grand Duchy of Frankfurt	
	1806–1815	Flag of County of Isenburg	
	1807–1813	Flag of Kingdom of Westphalia	

=== Lower Saxony ===
==== Brunswick ====
Flag	Date	Use	Description
	1830–1918	Flag of Duchy of Brunswick	
	1814–1830	Flag of Duchy of Brunswick	

==== Hanover ====
Flag	Date	Use	Description
	1946	Flag of State of Hanover	
	1837–1866	Second flag of the Kingdom of Hanover	
	1692–1837	Flag of Electorate of Hanover and first flag of the Kingdom of Hanover	

==== Oldenburg ====
Flag	Date	Use	Description
	1871–1918	Flag of Grand Duchy of Oldenburg	Flag proportions: 3:5; Cross proportions: 9-6-9:12-6-22
	1810–1815	Flag of First French Empire	
	1774–1871	Flag of the Duchy of Oldenburg and Grand Duchy of Oldenburg	Flag proportions: 3:5; Cross proportions: 9-6-9:17-6-17
	?–1774	Flag of County of Oldenburg	

==== Schaumburg-Lippe ====
Flag	Date	Use	Description
	1647–1918	Flag of Principality of Schaumburg-Lippe	

=== Mecklenburg-Vorpommern ===
Flag	Date	Use	Description
	1813–1918	Flag of Grand Duchy of Mecklenburg-Schwerin	
	1864–1918	Flag of Grand Duchy of Mecklenburg-Strelitz	
	1630–1815	Flag of Swedish Pomerania	Flag of Sweden

=== North Rhine-Westphalia ===
==== Lippe ====
Flag	Date	Use	Description
	1880–1918	Flag of Principality of Lippe	
	c.1858–1880	Flag of Principality of Lippe	
	1811–1814	Flag of department of Lippe	Flag of France

==== Other ====
Flag	Date	Use	Description
	1945–1949	Flag of British occupation zone in Germany	Union Flag
	1923	Flag of Rhenish Republic	
	1806–1808	Flag of Grand Duchy of Berg	
	1803–1810	Flag of Arenberg	
	1803–1806	Flag of County of Dülmen	
	1798–1811	Flag of County of Dülmen	
	1797–1802	Flag of Cisrhenian Republic	
	1770–1803	Flag of Prince-Bishopric of Münster	
	1166–1801	Flag of Free Imperial City of Aachen	

=== Rhineland-Palatinate ===
==== Palatinate ====
Flag	Date	Use	Description
	1945–1949	Flag of French occupation zone in Germany	Flag of France
	before 1604 – 1776	Flag of Electorate of the Palatinate	
	1604–?	Flag of Electorate of the Palatinate	

==== Mainz ====
Flag	Date	Use	Description
	medieval–1803	Banner of the Electorate of Mainz	

==== Trier ====
Flag	Date	Use	Description
	medieval–1801	Banner of the Electorate of Trier	

=== Saarland ===
==== Palatinate ====
Flag	Date	Use	Description
	1947–1956	Flag of Saar Protectorate	
	1920–1935	Flag of Territory of the Saar Basin	
	1798–1814	Flag of department of Sarre	Flag of France

=== Saxony ===
Flag	Date	Use	Description
	1945–1949	Flag of Soviet occupation zone of Germany	Flag of the Soviet Union
	1815–1918	Flag of Kingdom of Saxony	
	1356–1806	Electoral flag of Electorate of Saxony	
	10th cent. – 1806	State flag of Electorate of Saxony	
	around 950	Saxon flag by the House of Ascania; associated for the Saxon Ostmark and battleflag for the Saxon Eastern March	

=== Saxony-Anhalt ===
==== Anhalt ====
Flag	Date	Use	Description
	1806–1918	Flag of Duchy of Anhalt	

==== Anhalt-Bernburg, Anhalt-Dessau and Anhalt-Köthen ====
Flag	Date	Use	Description
	1252–1468	Flag of Anhalt-Bernburg	A square vertical bicolour of green and white.
	1603–1863	Flag of Anhalt-Bernburg	A square vertical bicolour of green and white.
	1396–1561	Flag of Anhalt-Dessau	A square vertical bicolour of green and white.
	1603–1863	Flag of Anhalt-Dessau	A square vertical bicolour of green and white.
	1396–1562	Flag of Anhalt-Köthen	A square vertical bicolour of green and white.
	1603–1853	Flag of Anhalt-Köthen	A square vertical bicolour of green and white.

=== Schleswig-Holstein ===
==== Heligoland ====
Flag	Date	Use	Description
	1945–1952	Flag of British occupation zone in Germany	Union Flag
	1807–1890	Flag of British Heligoland	
	1807–1890	Government Ensign of British Heligoland	
	1807–1890	Flag of the Lieutenant-Governor of British Heligoland	

==== Holstein ====
Flag	Date	Use	Description
	?–1864	Civil Ensign of Duchy of Holstein	

==== Lübeck ====
Flag	Date	Use	Description
	medieval–1918	Flag of Free City of Lübeck	

==== Saxe-Lauenburg ====
Flag	Date	Use	Description
	1814–1876	Flag of Saxe-Lauenburg	

==== Schleswig ====
Flag	Date	Use	Description
	?–1866	Flag of Duchy of Schleswig	

=== Thuringia ===
==== Reuss ====
Flag	Date	Use	Description
	1806–1918	Flag of Principality of Reuss-Gera	A vertical black-red-yellow tricolour flag.
	1778–1918	Flag of Principality of Reuss-Greiz	

==== Saxe-Altenburg ====
Flag	Date	Use	Description
	1893–1918	Flag of Duchy of Saxe-Altenburg	

==== Saxe-Coburg and Gotha ====
Flag	Date	Use	Description
	1911–1920	Flag of Duchy of Saxe-Coburg and Gotha	
	?–1826	Flag of Duchy of Saxe-Hildburghausen	

==== Saxe-Gotha-Altenburg ====
Flag	Date	Use	Description
	1680–1826	Flag of Duchy of Saxe-Gotha-Altenburg	

==== Saxe-Meiningen ====
Flag	Date	Use	Description
	1826–1918	Flag of Duchy of Saxe-Meiningen	

==== Saxe-Weimar-Eisenach ====
Flag	Date	Use	Description
	1897–1918	Flag of Saxe-Weimar-Eisenach	
	1813–1897	Flag of Saxe-Weimar-Eisenach	

==== Schwarzburg-Sondershausen ====
Flag	Date	Use	Description
	1599–1918	Flag of Principality of Schwarzburg-Sondershausen	

=== Other ===
Flag	Date	Use	Description
	1989–1990	Used by supporters of German reunification in East Germany after the fall of the Berlin Wall.	The state flag of East Germany with its central emblem physically cut out.
	1924–1933; 1953	Flag of the Reichsbanner Schwarz-Rot-Gold	The Reichsbanner Schwarz-Rot-Gold was an unofficial republican paramilitary organization dominated by social democrats, liberals, and members of the Catholic Centre Party, to defend the Weimar Republic against National Socialists, communists, and monarchists. Refounded in 1953 as an association for political education.
	1914–1919	Spartacus League	
	1816	Flag of Urburschenschaft	
	1609–1635	Banner of the Catholic League	
	1539	Banner of the Peasants' army	
	1488–1534	Banner of the Swabian League	

== Historic flag proposals ==
Note: Ottfried Neubecker's proposal of 1919 and those of Josef Wirmer in 1944 and of his brother Ernst in 1948 are clearly modeled on the Nordic Cross flags used in all Nordic countries – the flags of Denmark, Norway, Sweden, Finland and Iceland all having the same horizontal cross, though differing in colour.

Flag	Date	Use	Description
	1817	German unification flag at Wartburg Festival	
	1832	German unification flag at Hambach Festival	
	1926	Ottfried Neubecker's Proposal	
	1944	Proposal for the flag of Germany after 1944 military coup d'état by Josef Wirmer; later considered for adoption by the Constitutional Convention at Herrenchiemsee (Wirmer flag)	
	1948	Proposal for the flag for West Germany, based on Josef Wirmer's 1944 design, created by his brother, Ernst	
	1948	Proposal for the flag for West Germany by Paul Wentzcke, based on 1848 republican designs	A vertical black-red-yellow tricolour flag.
	1948	Proposal for the flag for West Germany by Edwin Redslob	
	1948	Proposal for a national flag, by Robert Lehr	

=== Nazi Germany occupations (1939–1945) ===
Flag	Date	Use	Description
	1940	Proposal flag for General Government of occupied Poland	Flag proposal for the newly General Government, known only from the description.
	1939–1945	Unofficial flag of New Swabia	Flag of Reichskolonialbund and common flag for all German colonies during the Nazi period, in practice only for the New Swabia.

=== German colonial empire (1884–1918) ===
Flag	Date	Use	Description
	1914	Proposal for German East Africa	The flags of the German overseas colonies were first proposed in 1914, but were never implemented due to the breakout of World War I.
	1914	Proposal for German Kamerun	The flags of the German overseas colonies were first proposed in 1914, but were never implemented due to the breakout of World War I.
	1914	Proposal for German New Guinea	The flags of the German overseas colonies were first proposed in 1914, but were never implemented due to the breakout of World War I.
	1914	Proposal for German Samoa	The flags of the German overseas colonies were first proposed in 1914, but were never implemented due to the breakout of World War I.
	1914	Proposal for German South-West Africa	The flags of the German overseas colonies were first proposed in 1914, but were never implemented due to the breakout of World War I.
	1914	Proposal for German Togoland	The flags of the German overseas colonies were first proposed in 1914, but were never implemented due to the breakout of World War I.

== House Flags ==
=== German shipping company ===
Flag	Date	Use	Description
		Aug. Bolten Wm. Miller’s Nachfolger	
	?–present	Bossler shipping companies	
	1819–present	F. A. Vinnen & Co.^{de}	
	1871–present	Hamburg Süd	
	1920–present	Hugo Stinnes Schiffahrt	
	1901–present	Johann M. K. Blumenthal^{de}	
	1903–present	Leonhardt & Blumberg^{de}	
	1920–present	Ludwig & Jakob Götz^{de}	
	1928–present	Reederei Baltrum-Linie^{de}	
	1900–present	Reederei Warrings^{de}	
	1982–present	Rickmers Group	
	?–present	Schiffswerft Philipp Ebert und Söhne^{de}	
	1890–present	Unterweser Reederei^{de}	
	1946–present	Waibel KG^{de}	
	1885–present	Wyker Steamship Shipping Company Föhr-Amrum^{de}	
	1896–1922	Argo Reederei^{de}	
	1899–1969	A. Kirsten^{de}	
Recreated flag of Cassens-Werft	1875–2018	Cassens-Werft^{de}	
	1872–1926	Deutsche Dampfschiffahrtsgesellschaft Kosmos^{de}	
	1890–1942	Deutsche Ost-Afrika Linie	
	1881–1980	DDG Hansa	
	1873–1974	D. G. Neptun^{de}	
	1821–1918	D. H. Wätjen & Co.^{de}	
	1889–1970	Deutsche Levante-Linie^{de}	
	1898–1931	Emil R. Retzlaff	
	1970s	Fendel-Stinnes	
	1958–1973	Hamburg Atlantic Line	
	1991–1997	Hamburg Atlantic Line	
	1847–1970	Hamburg America Line	
	1887–1939	Hamburg-Bremen-Africa-line^{de}	
	1907–1920s	Hugo Stinnes Linien GmbH	
	1884–1914	Jantzen & Thormählen	
	1850–1879	Liniendienst von Joh. Ces. Godeffroy & Sohn	
	1924–1990	Lübeck Linie^{de}	
	1808–?	Mathias Stinnes^{de}	
	1857–1970	Norddeutscher Lloyd	
	1882–2018	Oldenburg-Portugiesische Dampfschiffs-Rhederei^{de}	
	1869–1967	Reederei Robert Meyhoefer^{de}	
	1905–1959	Roland-Linie^{de}	
	1885–1942	Woermann-Linie	

=== German Chartered company ===
Flag	Date	Use	Description
	1882–1898	German New Guinea Company	
	1884–1920	German East Africa Company	
	1884–1885	German East Africa Company	
	1885–1903	German West African Company	
	1875–1939	Hernsheim & Co	
	1887	Jaluit Company	
	1888–?	Jaluit Company	
	1878–1887	German trading and plantation company from the South Sea Islands	

=== Other companies ===
Flag	Date	Use	Description
	1935–1937	Deutsche Zeppelin-Reederei	
	1904–?	East African Railway Society	

== German yacht clubs ==
Flag	Club
	Academic Sailing Club in Kiel^{de}
	Blankeneser Segel-Club^{de}
	Flensburger Segel-Club^{de}
	Seebrucker Regatta-Verein
	Segelclub Rhe
	Segler Verein Wörthsee
	Segler-Gemeinschaft Utting e.V.
	Seglervereinigung 1903 Berlin
	Spandauer Yacht-Club^{de}
	Verein Seglerhaus am Wannsee
	Württembergischer Yacht Club
	Yacht-Club Bad Wiessee e.V.
	The German Sea Sports Association HANSA^{de}
	AYC-StAG^{de}
	Hamburger Segel-Club
	Kaiserlicher Yacht Club
	Kieler Yacht-Club
	Lübecker Yacht-Club
	Marine-Regatta-Verein
	Norddeutscher Regatta Verein
	Yacht-Club Nürnberg^{de}
	Segel-Club Oberhavel^{de}
	Sailing Fellowship "The Coat of Arms of Bremen"^{de}
Flag of the Segel-Motorboot-Club Friedrichshafen, without background	Segel-Motorboot-Club Friedrichshafen^{de}
	Stander ASV zu Halle
	Segel-Club "Ahoi"^{de}
	Sailing club "Weser"^{de}
	Water Sports Club 1921^{de}
	Weser Yacht Club Bremerhaven^{de}
	Yacht-Club von Deutschland (Burgee)
	National Socialist Flyers Corps (NSFK)
	Feldgendarmerie (Field Military Police)
	Yacht-Club von Deutschland (Ensign)

== Misattributed flags ==
Flag	Date	Use	Description
	2008	Inaccurate flag of Germany as shown in a Tagesthemen news report during its sports coverage of Germany's national soccer team during UEFA Euro 2008.	A tricolour, made of three equal horizontal bands coloured red (top), black, and gold (bottom). This version of the national flag was inaccurate because the position of the red and black stripes were swapped.
