= Wirmer Flag =

German flag proposed by Josef Wirmer

- Wirmer-Flagge
- Use: Proposed German National Flag after the assassination attempt of Adolf Hitler, 1944
- Proportion: 3:5
- Design: A red field charged with a gold-fimbriated black Nordic cross that extends to the edges.
- Designed by: Josef Wirmer

The Wirmer Flag (German: Wirmer-Flagge), also known commercially as the flag of German Resistance 20 July or the Stauffenberg flag, is a design by Josef Wirmer. Wirmer was a resistance fighter against the Nazi Regime and part of the 20 July plot. According to his idea, the flag was to become the new flag of Germany after the successful assassination attempt against Hitler and the transfer of power to the conspirators. First discussed by the Parlamentarischer Rat ("Parliamentary Council") in 1948/49 as the federal flag, the design served in modified form as the party flag of the Christian Democratic Union of Germany (CDU) from 1953 until around 1970 and as the model for the Free Democratic Party's (FDP) party symbol. The flag then disappeared from public perception.

In 1999, Reinhold Oberlercher, the thought leader of the Neo-Nazi German College ("Deutsches Kolleg"), declared the flag to be that of the Fourth Reich, aspired to by the college in his revised draft constitution of 9 November 1999, it became the college's flag. The German college also included Horst Mahler, who published the proclamation of the Reichsbürger movement on 14 December 2003. As a result, the flag became popular in the movement, which at the time received little media and social attention and was thus increasingly used by right-wing extremist and populist groups, which were met with criticism from various sides. Due to its high presence at the Dresden Pegida demonstrations, the flag was also referred to as the "Pegida flag" in some media reports.

== Origin ==
=== Ottfried Neubecker's design ===
Proposal attributed to Ottfried Neubecker, 1926

In the booklet Die Reichseinheitsflagge ("The Unity Flag of the Reich"), the vexillologist Ottfried Neubecker proposed in 1926 a flag in the color sequence black-gold-red as a compromise in the dispute over the German national flag ("Flaggenstreit"). He made two proposals for this: firstly, a tricolour in this color sequence, and secondly, a red Nordic Cross, outlined in gold, on a black background. This design also circulated as a Swallowtail as a proposal for a new Reichskriegsflagge ("imperial war flag"). It is believed that the Neubecker design may have influenced Wirmer later.

=== Josef Wirmer's design ===
Proposal based on specifications by Ernst Wirmer

Like Neubecker, Josef Wirmer designed the flag named after him based on the Nordic cross flags. His favored color scheme was created by experimenting with the three basic colors. In his opinion, the Christian cross was the most suitable as a symbol of the new state. The flag was to serve as a new national flag after the assassination of Adolf Hitler by Claus Schenk Graf von Stauffenberg and the takeover of government power by the bourgeois resistance groups involved, as they did not want to adopt the black-red-gold tricolour of the Weimar Republic.The colors, however, were intended to integrate the democratic forces, while the reference to the flags of the Scandinavian countries and the Christian symbolism were also intended to appeal to the conservative circles among the officers, who hated the Weimar Republic with its flag. Incidentally, the Wirmer design corrected the heraldic error in the color sequence of the tricolour. This violated the heraldic rule of tincture that between "colors" (here black and red) there must always be a "metal" (gold/yellow or silver/white). There is no evidence that Wirmer ever presented his design to the other conspirators. The failure of the assassination attempt and the seizure of power prevented the implementation of the flag. Josef Wirmer was arrested, sentenced to death, and executed on 8 September 1944.

It is speculative that the flag had a similarity in design to the Reichskriegsflagge ("imperial war flag") and was thus also to find acceptance in the Wehrmacht. However, a report by Ernst Wirmer, Josef's younger brother, confirms this assumption. According to this report, Josef Wirmer had revised his design once again and added a thin black line between gold and red, which corresponds to the Balkenkreuz ("bar cross") of the German war flags. The second design is repeatedly wrongly attributed to Ernst Wirmer himself.

== Later adaptations ==
=== Proposed national flag of the Federal Republic of Germany ===
Final proposal from the CDU, 1948

After World War II, the future national flag of the Federal Republic of Germany was discussed at the Constitutional Convention on Herrenchiemsee, which met between August 10 and 25, 1948. Although the participants agreed on the national colors black-red-gold, the shape of the national flag remained a point of contention. It was even emphasized that the choice of colors should not be equated with a return to the old tricolour of the Weimar Republic. The CDU, CSU and German Party feared that this would provoke a "disastrous flag dispute". Moreover, the Socialist Unity Party of Germany (SED) had already provided for the tricolour from 1919 as the flag of the GDR in its draft constitution of 22 November 1946. Ernst Wirmer, now a member of the Parlamentarischer Rat (Parliamentary Council), persuaded the delegates of the Union parties and the German Party to adopt his brother's second draft on 16 October 1948, and to propose it on 5 November, while the Social Democratic Party of Germany (SPD) preferred the old tricolour of the Weimar Republic which prevailed in the end.

Another version of the "cross flag" was submitted by the CDU. The bill's draft read: "The flag of the Federation shows a black cross lying on a red background with a superimposed golden cross." In December 1948, the Allensbach Institute for Public Opinion Research polled about 1,000 people in the three western zones about their preferences concerning a national flag. The tricolour of the Weimar Republic received 35 percent, 15 percent favored the "cross flag," 10 percent rejected both proposals, and 40 percent expressed indecision or disinterest. The future President of Germany, Theodor Heuss considered the cross flag to be "graphic arts" and a "artificiality". In a poll in the Parliamentary Council, 25 percent of the members voted for a return to the black-red-gold tricolour in the tradition of the Weimar Republic, 35 percent had no opinion or abstained. The motion of the Union was rejected and the old tricolour was designated the new federal flag by a large majority.

=== CDU and FDP party flags ===
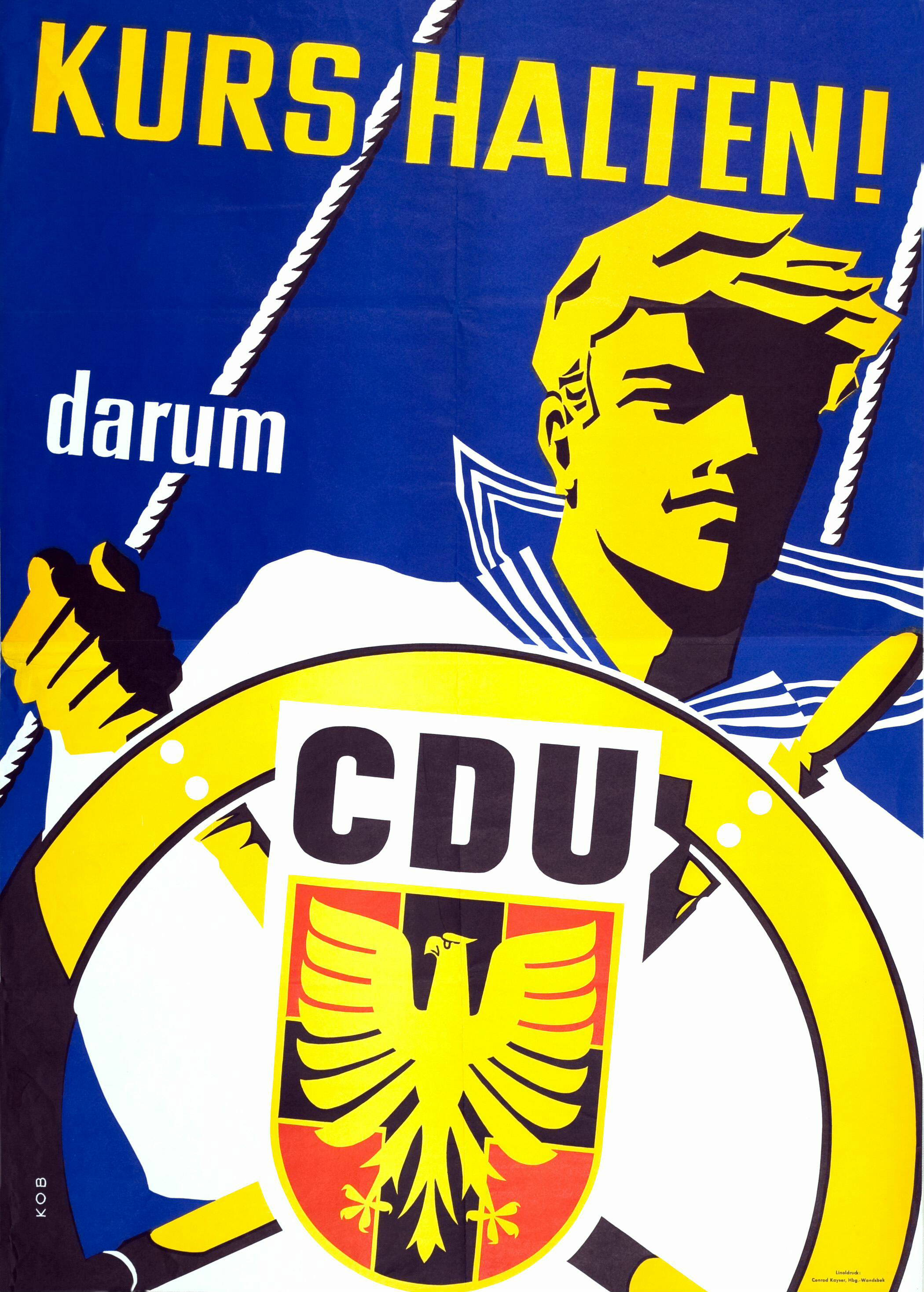
CDU election poster from 1957 with black-red-gold coat of arms

FDP flag, 1952

At the party congress of 18–22 April 1953, the CDU adopted a cross flag as the party flag and escutcheon, based on Josef Wirmer's design. This no longer had the cross offset to the hoist in Scandinavian style, but centered with horizontal arms of equal length. In addition, a likewise centered golden eagle facing heraldically to the right spanned the motif.

The Young Union adopted as its symbol a badge with a color row like Neubecker's design: a red cross outlined in gold on a black background. There is evidence of frequent use until 1962, when the cross symbol disappeared. Thereafter, it continued to be used, presumably only for cost reasons, in the local and district associations until the 1970s.

The FDP also adopted a party flag derived from the Wirmer flag at its party convention in Bad Ems in 1952. Its gold cross outlined in black on a red background retained the Scandinavian offset. On the cross rested an eagle with the party initials facing (heraldically) left. Its Saarland offshoot, the Democratic Party Saar (DPS), reversed the eagle's viewing direction to the (heraldic) right. It is speculated whether the heraldically wrong direction of the FDP eagle is a legacy of former NSDAP functionaries, who were numerously present in the young party. The NSDAP eagle also looked to the left - with the justification that the east was the geographical target of the "movement". The DPS justified the look to the right with the representation of the song "Die Wacht am Rhein" ("The Watch on the Rhine") towards the West.

With the end of its use as a party symbol, the various cross flags in black-red-gold disappeared from everyday life. The Wirmer flag remained well known in vexillologist circles and appeared in corresponding publications. For example, in 1981 the political scientist Theodor Eschenburg interviewed Ernst Wirmer about his brother's flag designs. In the newspaper 'Ostpreußenblatt' issue of 31 October 1987, the Wirmer flag and its history were discussed by Harry S. Schurdel in the series "German National Flags".

=== Usage by right-wing extremist and right-wing populist groups ===
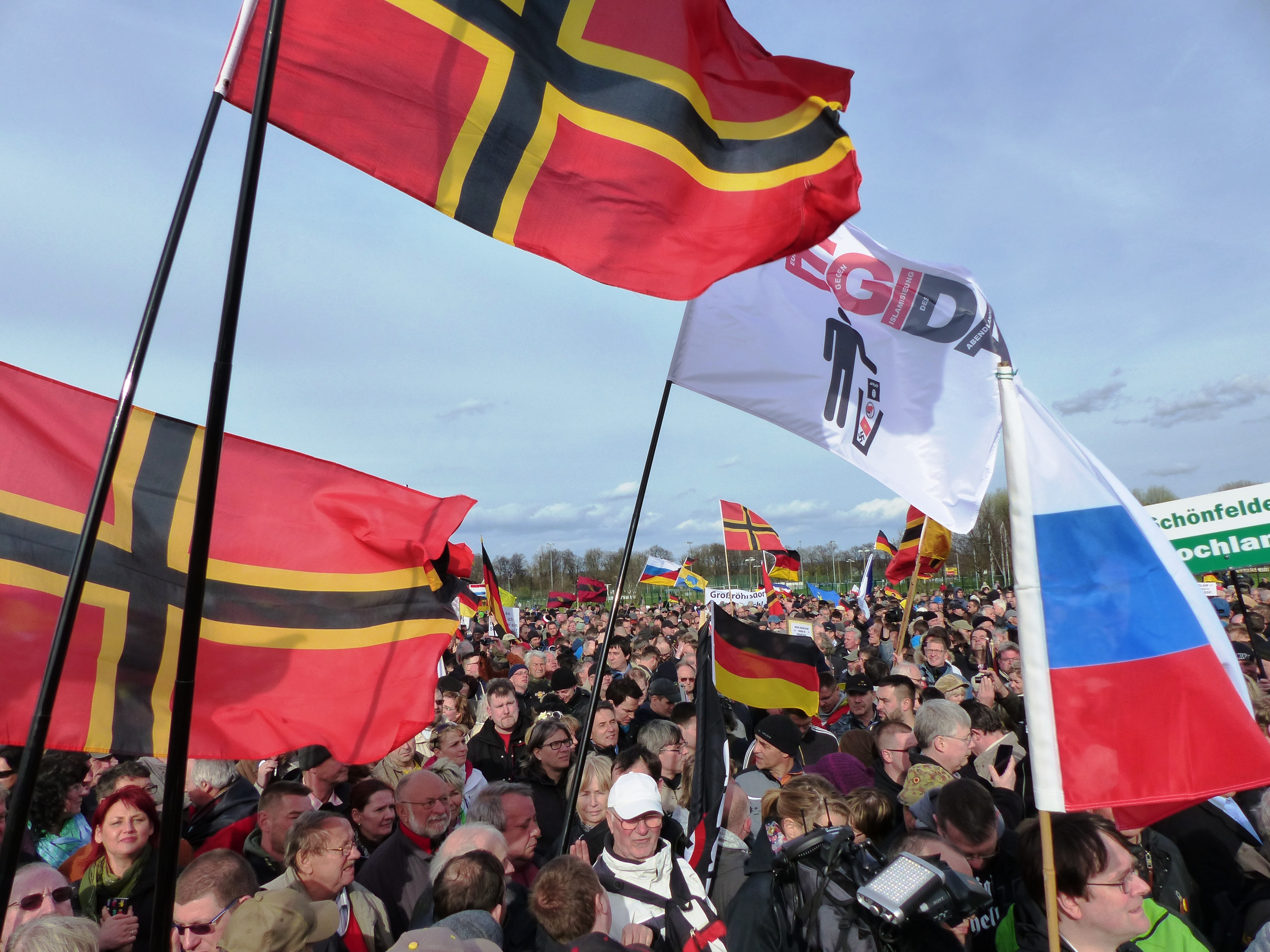
Wirmer flags at a Pegida demonstration in Dresden (April 2015)

In 1999, Reinhold Oberlercher, as the thought leader of the neo-Nazi German College, with which the right-wing extremists Horst Mahler and Uwe Meenen are affiliated, proclaimed the Wirmer flag as the possible national flag of the "Fourth Reich" they aspire to. Through Horst Mahler, who proclaimed his Reich citizenship movement on 14 December 2003, the flag spread in the Reich citizenship milieu. Since then, the Wirmer flag has appeared more and more frequently at events of right-wing extremist and right-wing populist groups in Germany, such as the German Defence League, Hogesa, pro NRW, and in large numbers at the PEGIDA demonstrations, as a "neo-conservative battle sign".

There are no legal restrictions on the Wirmer flag - unlike the Reichskriegsflagge ("imperial war flag"), which produces a similar effect, and which even in the version without the swastika can be seized by the police for "violation of public order". On the blog Politically Incorrect (PI), classified as extremist and anti-constitutional by the Bavarian Ministry of the Interior, the flag is seen as a symbol against alleged foreign domination by foreign countries. The Scandinavian cross would be a "commitment to Nordic cultural tradition" and the "response of resistance fighters to an un-Christian state." Parts of the New Right see the flag as a sign of "Secret Germany".

Writing in the newspaper Die Welt, Sven Felix Kellerhoff called the use of the flag by right-wing populists a "misjudgment" based "on fundamental historical ignorance." Josef Wirmer's son Anton expressed appalment. He said that it was basically the distortion of all the ideas that his father's flag represented. It is important, he added, "to clarify what the origin of the flag is and what ideas were associated with it. The Wirmer flag does not stand for an abstract concept of resistance. Above all, it stands for a free and tolerant society." The Frankfurter Allgemeine Zeitung quotes Robert von Steinau-Steinrück, chairman of the 20 July 1944 Foundation, with the assessment that waving the Wirmer flag at extremist and xenophobic events mocks what Josef Wirmer stood for: a free and tolerant society. In his article for the Konrad Adenauer Foundation, Jan Schlürmann writes about the Wirmer flag that this is an "expropriation of a venerable and traditional symbol of Christian democracy."

== See also ==
- Historic flag proposals for Germany
- Proposed Designs for the Flag of Germany
