= LYC =

LYC, Lyc or variant thereof, may refer to:

- Lycksele Airport, Sweden (IATA code: LYC)
- Lynden Air Cargo, an American cargo airline (ICAO code: LYC)
- Lympstone Commando railway station, British rail station (UK rail station code: LYC)
- Lübecker Yacht-Club, Germany
- Lyc photon (LyC photon), the Lyman continuum photons, a kind of photon emitted from stars
- Lycaste, abbreviated as Lyc in horticultural trade, a genus of orchids
- Lycurgus of Sparta, abbreviated as Lyc in references
