= Kieler Yacht-Club =

Yacht club in Germany

Coordinates: 54°20′N 10°09′E

- Burgee
- Short name: KYC
- Founded: 1887 (as the "Marine-Regatta-Verein")
- Location: Kiel, Germany
- Website: www.kyc.de

Kieler Yacht-Club (German for 'Kiel Yacht Club') is one of the oldest yacht clubs in Germany. It is located in the harbor city of Kiel. This club is well known for some of the yacht racing events it organizes. The main one is the yearly Kieler Woche (Kiel Week), which is perhaps the biggest sailing event in the world.

== Origins of the club ==
A club for military personnel, the "Marine-Regatta-Verein" (Naval Regatta Club), was established in 1887 in Kiel by officers of the Imperial German Navy. German Emperor Wilhelm II's younger brother, Prince Heinrich of Prussia, a yachting enthusiast, was its patron. In 1891, Wilhelm II became the club's commodore, bringing his own yacht Meteor I (the former Thistle) to the club's marina in Kiel. That same year, the club changed its name to "Kaiserlicher Yacht Club" (Imperial Yacht Club). Among other changes introduced, the club allowed civilian members to join.

In 1914, the German Emperor got the fateful news of the assassination of Austro-Hungarian heir to the throne Archduke Franz Ferdinand in Sarajevo, while he was competing on a regatta organized by the Kaiserlicher Yacht Club. During World War I, the Kiel Week regatta had to be called off. 455 members of the Kaiserlicher Yacht Club died and its club house was transformed into a Lazaretto. After these difficult years, the club almost went bankrupt. William II remained as honorary commodore of the Kaiserlicher Yacht Club, even after the Treaty of Versailles that brought the German monarchy to an end and forced him to live in exile in Doorn, the Netherlands.

During Nazi rule, the Kaiserlicher Yacht Club was manipulated by the propaganda machine of the state that made wide use of sports in order to harden the German spirit. This yacht club took part in the organization of Hitler's 1936 Summer Olympics. In 1937, the Kaiserlicher Yacht Club was forcefully merged with other yacht clubs to form a massive entity, the "Yacht-Club von Deutschland" (YCvD) – Yacht Club of Germany – to instill unity among German youth. The club's name "Kaiserlicher Yacht Club", deemed by the Nazis not to be in tune with "the spirit of the times", became history. The exiled and ailing former Emperor William was stripped of the honorary commodore's title. During World War II, sailing activities were discouraged, the club house was seized by the government, and many members of the yacht club died in the war.

== After World War II ==
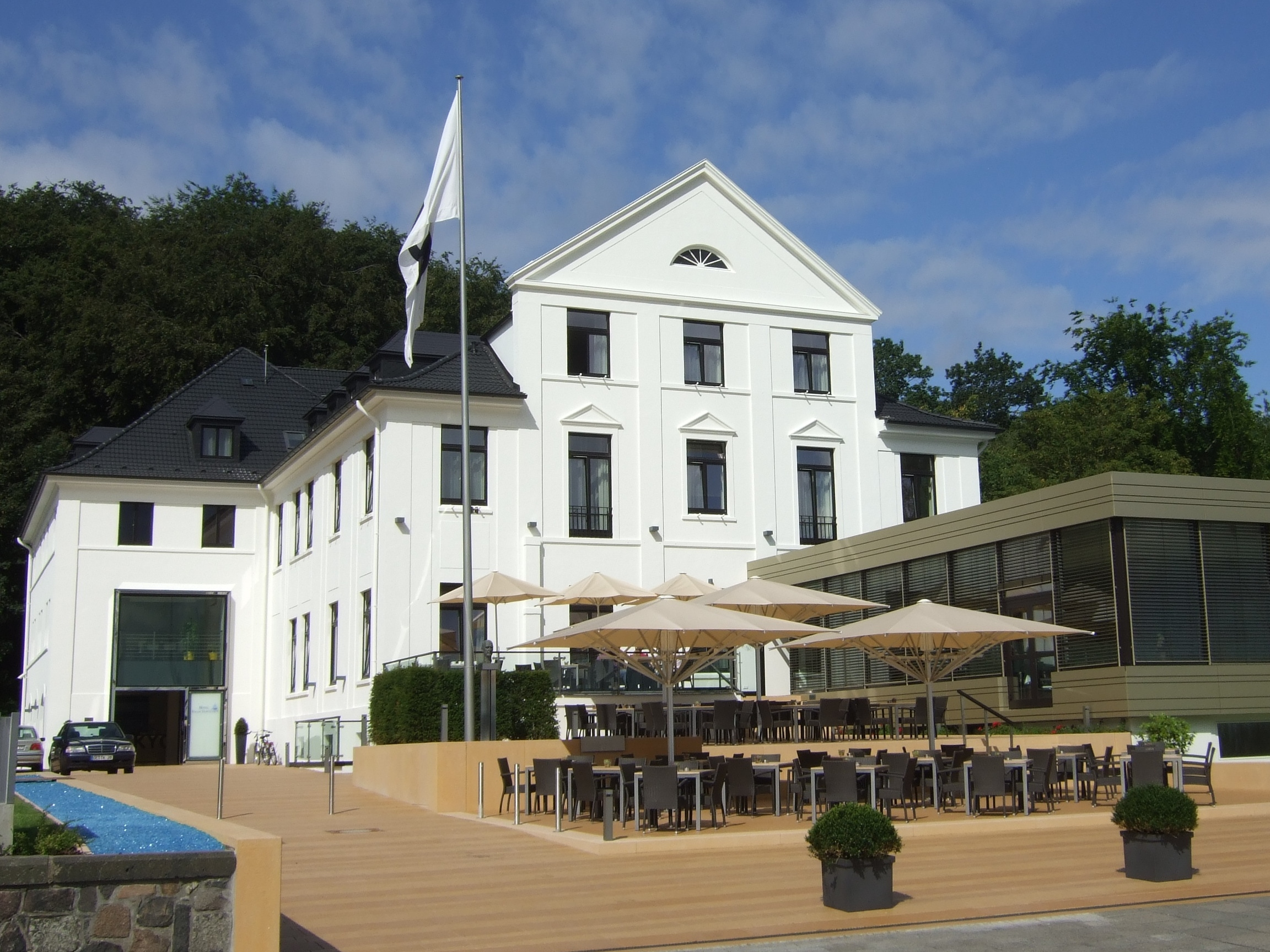
Club house

In the postwar years, Kiel was under British occupation, and regulations imposed by the new rulers made yacht clubs in Kiel no longer operative. British officers ran a "British Kiel Yacht Club", which even revived the Kiel Week regattas in 1946 and 1947, but German citizens were excluded from this military yacht club.

In 1948, Kiel Yacht Club was allowed to be established, and during the following decades, it experienced steady growth. After its recovery, it became again one of the most prestigious yacht clubs in Germany.

In 1972, when the Olympic Games were held in Munich, the Olympic sailing competitions took place in Kiel Bay, and this yacht club had a major role in their organization.

In 1982, the celebrations for the Kiel Week's 100th birthday were organized with a large windjammer parade to close the event.

In 2007, Kiel Yacht Club ran into serious financial difficulties and had to sell its club house to the ThyssenKrupp company.
