= Lübecker Yacht-Club =

- Burgee
- Short name: LYC
- Location: Lübeck, Germany
- Website: www.lyc.de

Lübecker Yacht-Club (Lübeck Yacht Club) is a yacht club in Germany.

== Locations ==
The club is run by two commodores and has four houses. The oldest one was established in 1898 in Lübeck, one of the former Hanseatic League cities. This building houses the club's youth section and the LYC-Marketing GmbH, a company officially registered by the Yacht Club of Lübeck that runs the projects of the club. There is room for 100 dinghies in its premises as well as the nostalgic 12-footer fleet.

It has three more buildings in nearby Travemünde, a borough of Lübeck located at the mouth of river Trave in Lübeck Bay. One of these buildings is a restored 1909 boathouse. It houses the club's social section and has a restaurant that is open to the public. It also has mooring space for visiting yachts as well as facilities for visitors. There is a ferry service to cross the Trave run by the club.

The other one is located at a place called Mövenstein, on the former premises of a 1925 seaside resort. It was obtained by the Yacht Club of Lübeck in 1994 and transformed into a building that houses the catamaran and dinghy fleet of the club. This place has onshore accommodation both for members and guests. Also there is another building that is a regatta station for the Travemünder Woche, of which the Yacht Club of Lübeck is one of the main organizers.

== See also ==
- Kaiserlicher Yacht Club
- Württembergischer Yacht Club
