= Travemünde Week =

Second largest sailing race week in Germany

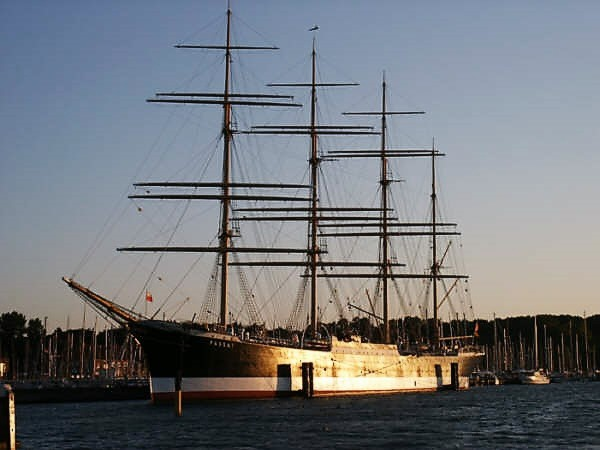
Barque Passat in Travemünde

The Travemünder Woche (engl. Travemünde Week) is the second largest annual race week in sailing in Germany (after Kiel Week). Since 1889, sailing events have been held at Travemünde located at the Bay of Lübeck. The main organizer of this event is the Yacht Club of Lübeck.

The 2024 event included ten days of activities, regattas and championships. The event attracts over 1,000 sailing participants and tens of thousands of visitors each year. In 2025, the a number of the offshore programs have had to be cut for visitors to reduce costs.

== Participating classes of sailing dinghies ==
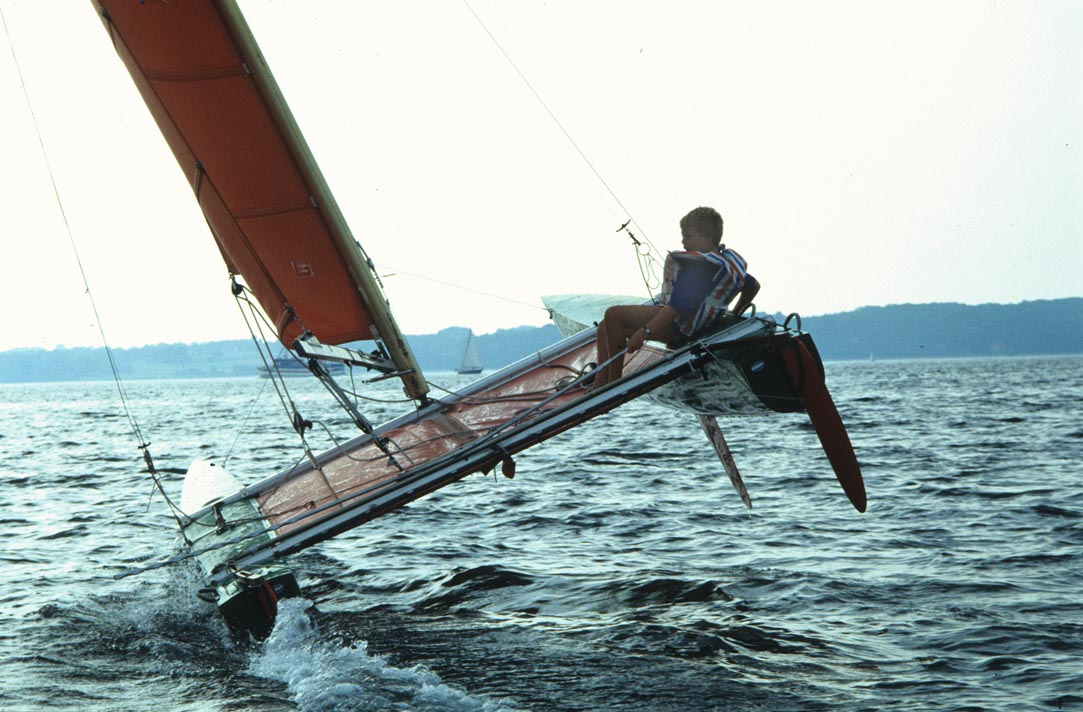
Tornado

Contender, 420, 470, 505, 49er, Flying Dutchman, Laser, Tornado, javelin

== Participating classes of keel boats and yachts ==
Nordic Folkboat, Dragon, J/22, J/24

== See also ==
- Yacht Club of Lübeck
- Norddeutscher Regattaverein
