= Württembergischer Yacht Club =

Coordinates: 47°38′N 09°22′E

Burgee of the Württembergischer Yacht Club.

The Württembergischer Yacht-Club (WYC) is a yacht club in Friedrichshafen. It is located on the shores of Lake Constance, Germany. This club was established in January 1911 as the "Königlich Württembergischer Yacht-Club" (Royal Yacht Club of Württemberg).

== History ==
The WYC was originally inscribed in the local Tettnang registry as the "Königlich Württembergischer Yacht-Club". It began under King Wilhelm II of Württemberg's royal patronage. Soon after its establishment, a small clubhouse was built.

Despite living in a landlocked kingdom, King William was a ship enthusiast. He had a vision of a German Fleet reaching deep into the country through its rivers. The king was instrumental in the establishment of the Württembergischer Yacht Club. This move followed the establishment of Yacht clubs in the neighboring kingdoms of Bavaria, Austria and Baden at the time.

In 1918, King William was deposed from the throne along with the other German rulers by the German Revolution (German: Novemberrevolution). In 1920, despite the ravages of World War I, the club had 358 members. Old King William II, the founder of the club, died on October 2d 1921.

== Merger ==
In 1937, during Nazi rule in Germany, the Sports Office of the Reich took away the power and freedom of all German sport associations. As a result, the Württembergischer Yacht Club was forcefully merged ("Einverleibt") with other German yacht clubs, foremost of which were the Kaiserlicher Yacht Club of Kiel and the Yacht Club of Bavaria (Bayerischer Yacht-Club) of Munich to form a massive entity, the Yacht-Club von Deutschland (Yacht Club of Germany).

The members of the House of Württemberg, the former ruling family of Württemberg, are still closely involved with the Württembergischer Yacht Club. The title of honorary commodore of the WYC was first held by King William II and it was passed on through Duke Albrecht, Duke Philipp, Duke Carl to the present day's commodore Duke Wilhelm of Württemberg.

== Achievements ==
- In the 1976 Summer Olympics the brothers Jörg and Eckart Diesch won the gold medal in the Flying Dutchman class off Kingston, Canada. This was the fourth time Germans had won Olympic gold in sailing since 1900.
- In 1978 Albert and Rudolf Batzill won the Flying Dutchman World Championship off Hayling Island.

== See also ==
- William II of Württemberg
- Yacht-Club von Deutschland
