= Yacht-Club von Deutschland =

Nazi-era German yacht club platform

Yacht Club of Germany
- Burgee
- Founded: 1937
- Location: Germany

Watersports flag of the Third Reich.

The Yacht-Club von Deutschland (YCvD), "Yacht Club of Germany", was a yacht club platform established in 1937 during Nazi rule in Germany.

== History ==
The Sports Office of the Reich (DRL/NSRL) was founded in July 1934. As a result of its activity all German sport associations gradually lost their independence and became subject to its manipulation.

The Yacht-Club von Deutschland originated after the 1936 Summer Olympics sailing events in the Bay of Kiel. The following year the prestigious Kaiserlicher Yacht Club (Imperial Yacht Club) was forcefully merged with local smaller clubs in the Kiel area, such as the "Kieler Segelvereinigung" (KSV).

The main purpose in the creation of the Yacht-Club von Deutschland was to "bring into line" the scattered yachting and sailing clubs of North Germany's former Hanseatic League cities under a central command along with yacht clubs elsewhere in Germany. The Yacht Club of Kiel's name "Kaiserlicher Yacht Club", deemed by the Nazis not to be in tune with "the spirit of the times" ("zeitgemäß"), soon fell into oblivion and the honorary commodore's title was withdrawn from old former Emperor William II, who withered in exile in Doorn, the Netherlands.

The Yacht-Club von Deutschland was further expanded by the "incorporation" ("Einverleibung") with other German yacht clubs having a royal background. Foremost of these were the Yacht Club of Bavaria (Bayerischer Yacht-Club) and the Württembergischer Yacht Club, to form a massive pan-German entity.

After successfully organizing the 1937 Kiel Week, the Yacht-Club von Deutschland supported the Norddeutscher Regatta Verein (NRV) in the organization of the Star Class European Championship in the same year.

Upon the 1938 annexation of Austria ("Anschluss"), half of the Austrian yacht clubs were brought under the wing of the Yacht-Club von Deutschland. In 1939 many of the sailing competitions and other planned events in preparation for the 1940 Helsinki Summer Olympics were carried out in Germany, especially in Kiel, despite the imminence of the war.

The last significant activity of the Yacht-Club von Deutschland right before the outbreak of World War II was the organization of the Star World Championship, together with the NRV. YCvD Kiel members Dr. Peter Hansohm and Christian Blankenburg ended up third in the general classification. On September 1, participants belonging mainly to nations that had become hostile were brought safely across the border into Denmark together with their boats. This operation was carried out with the assistance of the Kriegsmarine.

World War II radically altered the role of the Yacht-Club von Deutschland in the country. Even though it continued its sailing school activities among the youth for a few years, yachting was discouraged. In 1940 monetary funds for organizing sailing events, like Kiel Week, were not forthcoming. Contributors felt emboldened to deny funds to the Yacht-Club von Deutschland owing to the war-related shifting of priorities.

In the last years of the war many members of the many branches of the yacht club, among them young teenagers, had to go to fight to the fronts. A figure of the casualties is not known. The Yacht-Club von Deutschland's short life ended with the capitulation of the Nazi government in 1945. As a Nazi organization, it was disbanded when the American Military Government issued a special law outlawing the Nazi party and all of its branches. The smaller yacht clubs that had been forcefully merged with it had to be reestablished anew after the war. Since the Kaiser had died in 1941 and the reestablishment of the club under the name "Yacht-Club von Deutschland" was not allowed by the British occupying authorities, the former Kaiserlicher Yacht Club was reestablished as the Yacht Club of Kiel.

The Yacht-Club von Deutschland should not be confused with the Motor-Yacht-Club von Deutschland.

== Publications ==
- Mitteilungsblatt des Yacht-Clubs von Deutschland. — Kiel: NS.-Gauverl. Schleswig-Holstein. (Newsletter)
- Monatsschrift des Yacht-Clubs von Deutschland e.V. (Monthly).
