= Josef Wirmer =

German jurist and resistance fighter against the Nazi régime (1901–1944)

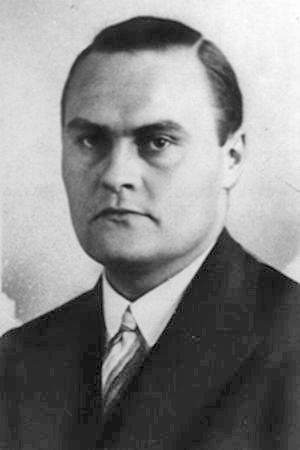
- Born: 19 March 1901; Paderborn, German Empire
- Died: 8 September 1944 (aged 43); Plötzensee Prison, Berlin, Nazi Germany
- Cause of death: Execution by hanging
- Political party: Centre

Josef Wirmer (19 March 1901 – 8 September 1944) was a German jurist and resistance fighter against the Nazi regime.

== Life ==
Born in Paderborn, Josef Wirmer was from a Catholic family of teachers. His father was a Gymnasium headmaster. After his Abitur in Warburg he studied law in Freiburg and Berlin. At that time, his democratic views were in marked contrast to the staunchly monarchist outlook still prevalent in learned circles, and this earned him the nickname "the red Wirmer". After his examinations for trainee lawyer (1924) and graduate civil servant (1927), he established himself in Berlin as a lawyer. There, in politics, he began to support the Centre Party, to the social left wing of which he belonged. It was his great hope to set up a grand coalition with the Social Democrats (SPD). After the so-called Machtergreifung, Josef Wirmer stood against the Nazis out of democratic convictions and worries about the constitutional state. Owing to his dedicated defence of those suffering racial persecution, he was thrown out of the national Lawyers League (Rechtswahrerbund). He did not like the conclusion of the Reichskonkordat with the Vatican. Whether, as some believe, he tried to get the then Cardinal Secretary of State Eugenio Pacelli, who later became Pope Pius XII, to intervene personally cannot be proved by any sources from that time.

In 1936, Wirmer came into contact with the trade-unionist resistance circles about Jakob Kaiser. From 1941, he belonged to the circle about Carl Friedrich Goerdeler. All historical research seems to make plain that Wirmer managed in the resistance to overcome with his personal contacts certain provisos which traditionally stood between such groups as the trade unionists and the Social Democrats, the church circles and the old noble élites. Wirmer supported Claus Schenk von Stauffenberg's plan to assassinate Hitler right from the beginning.

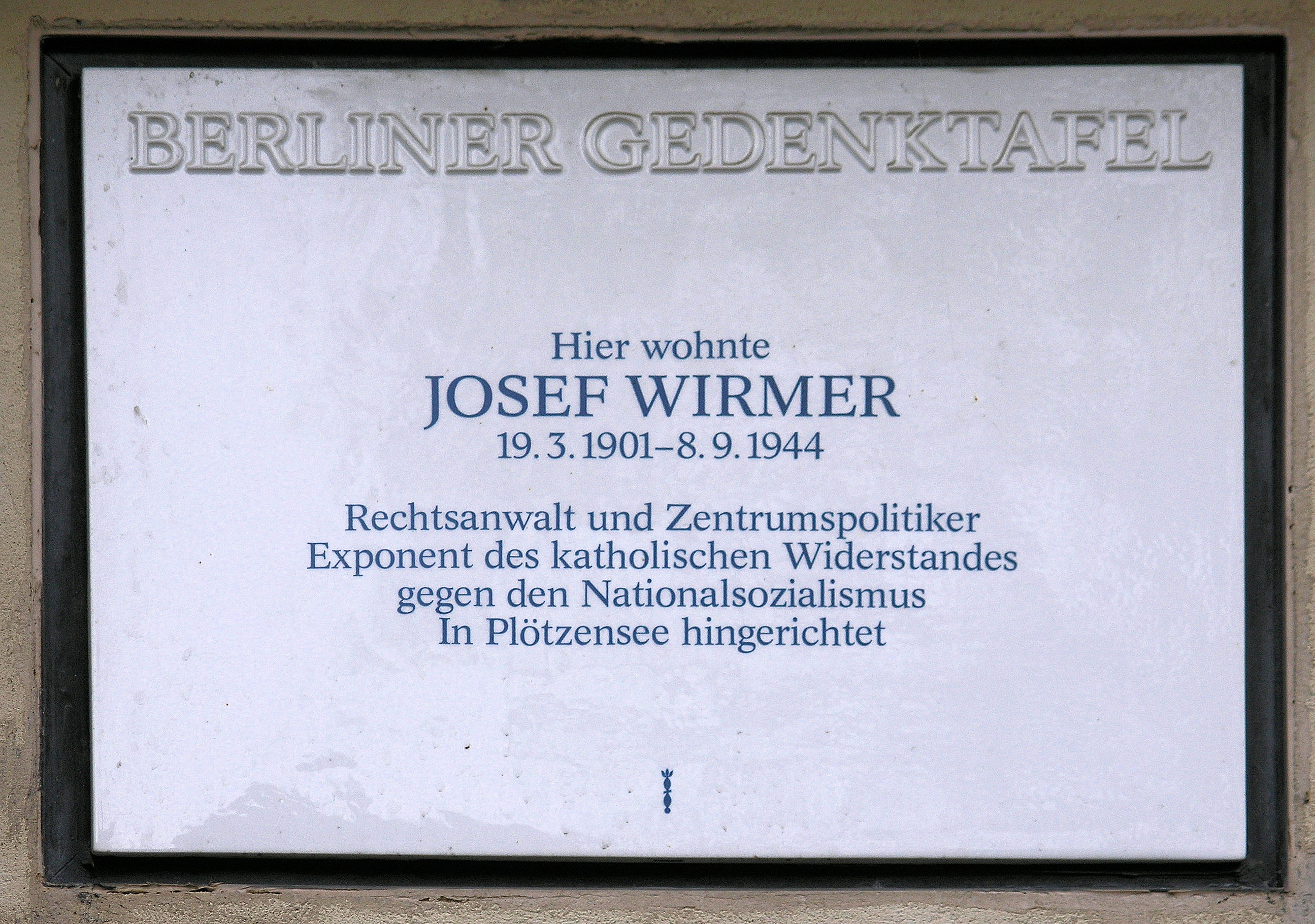
Josef Wirmer memorial plaque in Berlin-Lichterfelde

After Stauffenberg's plans failed and Hitler survived the bombing at the Wolf's Lair in East Prussia on 20 July 1944 – Josef Wirmer would have been Justice Minister if it had succeeded – Wirmer was arrested on 4 August. His appearance before the Volksgerichtshof was recorded in court records and in a film that was secretly shot on Hitler's orders. When Roland Freisler, who presided over the court, accused Wirmer of having a cowardly attitude,

"Joseph Wirmer, yes you belong to a black faction (black meant Catholic Centre Party at the time), yes that's what you're taken for, that can't be otherwise. It's weird. How important the position as a civilian lawyer that you have had must have been that you never once became a soldier at that age. And from then on you have been mobilized, which also speaks for your attitude, that you first wait, until someone mobilizes you. Fine rascal. (Shouting loudly) Yes, yes, yes, fine rascal!"

he replied,

"When I hang, I'll have no fear, but you will!"

When Freisler retorted that Wirmer would soon be going to hell, he answered with a "courtly bow",

"I'll look forward to your own imminent arrival, Mr. President!"

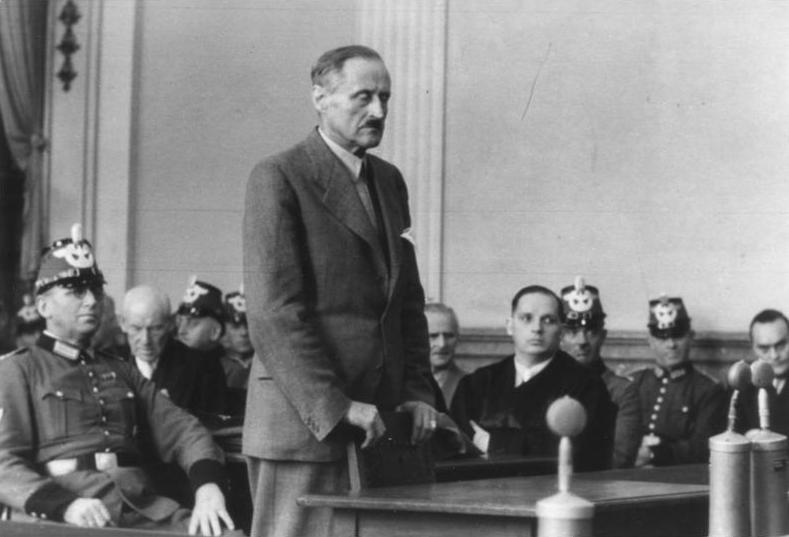
Ulrich von Hassell (standing) and Josef Wirmer (far right) in the People's Court, 1944

On 8 September 1944, Josef Wirmer was sentenced to death by the Volksgerichtshof. Two hours after the sentence had been handed down at the show trial, he was put to death by hanging with a wire noose at Plötzensee Prison in Berlin. Roland Freisler died five months afterwards during an Allied bombing raid.

== Wirmer flag ==
Wirmer's proposed new flag of Germany, 1944

Taking up long-lasting controversies surrounding the flag of Germany after World War I and previous proposals made by the vexillologist Ottfried Neubecker, Wirmer designed a national flag based on the Nordic Cross. His draft was meant as a proposal on a new German flag for the event that the conspirators of the 20 July plot would assume power following a successful attempt on Hitler by Stauffenberg. He thereby approached to conservative circles despising the black, red and gold tricolour of the Weimar Republic (and also remedied the breach of the rule of tincture).

After the war, when the West German Herrenchiemsee convention worked out a new constitution in 1948, Wirmer's flag design was again discussed. Though initially backed by Christian Democrats and German Party delegates, it was ultimately rejected in favor of a former black, red and gold tricolour. In the 1950s, the Christian Democratic Union as well as the Free Democratic Party temporarily adopted the Cross flag as party banners.

In recent times the Wirmer flag has come to be adopted by Neue Rechte movements, such as Hogesa or pro NRW, and is regularly displayed at Pegida rallies. This is a source of condemnation by many, who see it as an insult to the resistance, but others claim the use of the Wirmer flag is justified, as the aforementioned groups claim they resist just as the German resistance did.

== See also ==
- List of members of the 20 July plot

== Literature ==
- Friedrich G Hohmann (Hg.): Deutsche Patrioten in Widerstand und Verfolgung 1933–1945 : Paul Lejeune-Jung – Theodor Roeingh – Josef Wirmer – Georg Frhr. von Boeselager. Schöningh ISBN 3-506-73935-2
- Josef Wirmer – ein Gegner Hitlers. Essays and Documents, 2. Aufl. 1993 ISBN 3-922032-25-7
- Annedore Leber (publisher): Das Gewissen steht auf : 64 Lebensbilder aus d. dt. Widerstand 1933–1945 / gesammelt von Annedore Leber. Hrsg. in Zusammenarb. mit Willy Brandt u. Karl Dietrich Bracher. 10. Aufl., Berlin 1963 ISBN B0000BKS1R
- Jan Schlürmann: Die „Wirmer-Flagge“ – die wechselhafte Geschichte eines vergessenen Symbols der deutschen Christlichen Demokratie, in: Historisch-Politische Mitteilungen. Archiv für Christlich-Demokratische Politik 22 (2015), pp. 331–342.
