= Marine-Regatta-Verein =

Coordinates: 54°20′N 10°09′E

Present-day Burgee of the Marine-Regatta-Verein.

Historical burgee of the Marine-Regatta-Verein.

The Marine-Regatta-Verein (MRV), "Naval Regatta Union", is a yacht club of the German Navy. Its main branch is located in the harbor city of Kiel, and it has branches in different states of Germany. This club promotes both sailing and powerboating. Many of its members also are engaged in yacht racing and yacht cruising around the world.

Although it began as a yacht club for navy officers, it presently opens its doors to everyone with an interest in sailing and in the historical memory of both the German Navy and the merchant navy.

== History ==
This club was founded in February 1887 in Kiel by Vice Admiral von Blanc and Navy Engineer Busley along with other 112 officers of the Imperial German Navy. It was established as the "Marine-Regatta-Verein" (Regatta Union of the Navy), an association exclusively for military personnel in order "to foster the joy of sailing". Prince Heinrich of Prussia, a yachting enthusiast, was the patron of the club. The newly-born club organized its first successful regatta already in the same year in June.

In 1891 the 500 naval officers that ran the club elected Emperor Wilhelm II as their commodore. The club's name was altered to "Kaiserlicher Yacht Club" (Imperial Yacht Club). The new statutes allowed civilian members in, so the nature and the purpose of the club changed radically.

In August 1928, most of the active naval officers left the Kaiserlicher Yachtclub and revived the Marine-Regatta-Verein, as an organization attached to the German navy, which became the Kriegsmarine during Nazi times.

The Marine-Regatta-Verein took part in the organization of regattas in the Bay of Kiel, like the Kiel Week and the sailing events of Hitler's 1936 Summer Olympics. As a result the club went through a period of expansion, reaching a record number of 3,600 member, becoming the largest sailing club in Europe.

In 1945, at the end of World War II, the Marine-Regatta-Verein was disbanded by the allied forces in Kiel.

In May 1972 the Marine-Regatta-Verein was refounded in an effort led by Friedrich Rohlfing, who would become its president. The revived club was officially registered under the name Marine-Regatta-Verein im Deutschen Marinebund e.V. (MRV im DMB e.V.). It is under the Verein Deutscher Marinebund (German Navy Association) and it has its seat in Kiel.

== Notes and references ==
- Joachim Schuhmacher Gesellschaftlichkeit; Segeln als politischer Ausweg (de)
- George von Hase (c. 1920). Kiel and Jutland. Skeffington and son Ltd. Description of the Visit of a British squadron to kiel regatta in 1914, just before World War I.
