= Pro NRW =

Pro NRW Bürgerbewegung pro NRW
- Leader: Markus Beisicht
- Founded: 6 February 2007
- Dissolved: 24 March 2019
- Headquarters: Düsseldorf
- Membership (2010/2011): 900
- Ideology: Right-wing populism German nationalism Anti-immigration; Anti-Islam; Regionalism
- Political position: Far-right
- Colours: blue

Website
- pro-nrw.net

Pro NRW was a right-wing political party in Germany taking part in regional elections of North Rhine-Westphalia. The party achieved 1.5% in the North Rhine-Westphalia state election.
