= Kaiserlicher Yacht Club =

Forerunner to Kiel Yacht-Club (1887–1937)

Coordinates: 54°20′N 10°09′E

Burgee of the Kaiserlicher Yacht Club.

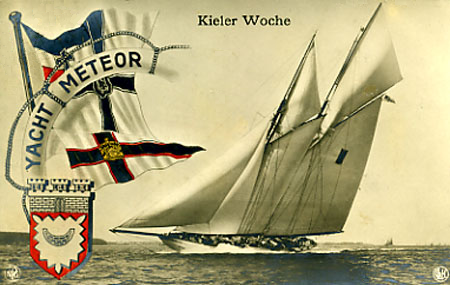
Meteor I, the Kaiser's yacht in Kiel

Kaiserlicher Yacht-Club, "Imperial Yacht Club", was one of the forerunners of the Kiel Yacht Club. Known also as "Küz" from its acronym KYC, it was a prestigious yacht club located in the harbor city of Kiel, Germany. German Emperor Wilhelm II, his younger brother Prince Heinrich of Prussia and Alfred Krupp were among its members. This club was famous for the sailing events it organized, including its role in the first Kieler Woche regattas, an event that still takes place yearly in the Kiel Bay.

== History ==
The origins of this club are in the "Marine-Regatta-Verein" (Regatta Union of the Navy), a club for naval officers of the Kaiserliche Marine founded in Kiel in 1887. The Marine-Regatta-Verein was specialized in yacht racing and Prince Heinrich of Prussia, a yachting enthusiast, was its patron. In 1891 the club allowed civilians in and Emperor Wilhelm II became its commodore, bringing his own yacht Meteor I (the former Thistle) to the club's marina in Kiel. The same year the club changed its name to "Kaiserlicher Yacht Club".

The club's youth section was founded in 1910. At the time of World War I the club house was transformed into a Lazaretto and 455 members of the Kaiserlicher Yacht Club died in the war. After these difficult years the club almost went bankrupt and it barely managed to survive.

The Kaiserlicher Yacht Club retained its name even after the Treaty of Versailles that brought the German monarchy to an end. William II remained as honorary commodore of the club, while he lived in exile in Doorn, the Netherlands.

During Nazi rule the Kaiserlicher Yacht Club, like all German sports organizations, was manipulated by the Nazi Sports Office. Even though it took part in the organization of the sailing events of Hitler's 1936 Summer Olympics in the Bay of Kiel, the Kaiserlicher Yacht Club gradually lost its freedom.

In 1937 the Kaiserlicher Yacht Club was forcibly merged with other yacht clubs and the commodore's title was withdrawn from exiled and ailing former Emperor William. A new massive entity, the "Yacht-Club von Deutschland" (YCvD), "Yacht Club of Germany", was formed to "instill unity among German youth" by introducing Nazi-ideology in the way the club was ruled. The club's name "Kaiserlicher Yacht Club", deemed by the Nazis not to be in tune with "the spirit of the times", passed into oblivion.

A contemporary avatar of this club was founded under the name Yacht Club of Kiel in 1948. The "Marine-Regatta-Verein" was refounded in 1972 as a separate club.
