= Patriots of Micronesia =

National anthem of Micronesia

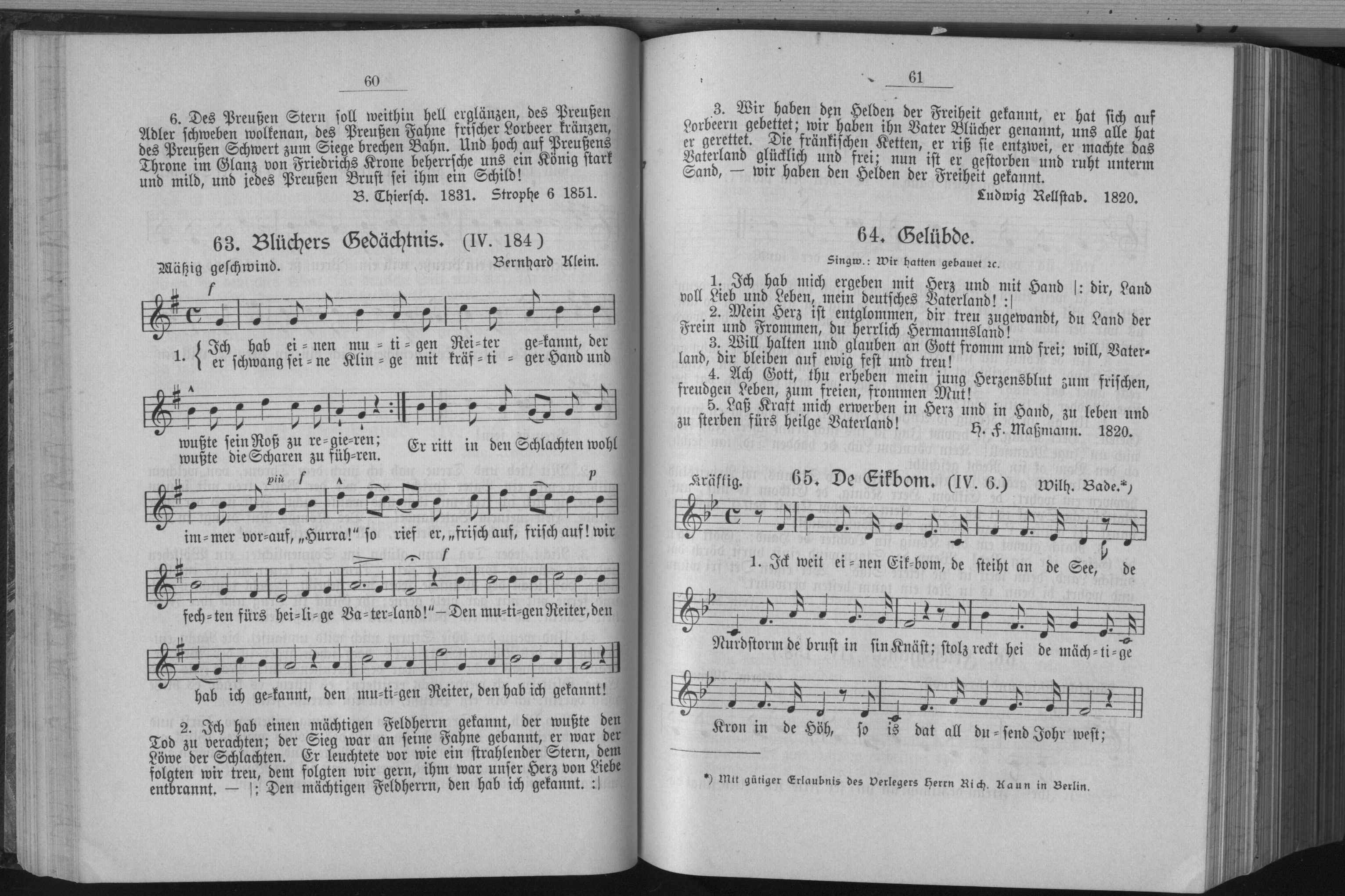
- The text of "Wir hatten gebauet ein stattliches Haus", the song in which the Micronesian national anthem was tuned
- National anthem of the Federated States of Micronesia
- Also known as: "Across all Micronesia"
- Music: August Daniel von Binzer, 1819
- Adopted: 1991
- Preceded by: "Preamble"

Audio sample
- U.S. Navy Band instrumental version: file; help

U.S. Navy Band instrumental version (one verse)

"Patriots of Micronesia", also known as "Across all Micronesia", is the national anthem of the Federated States of Micronesia.

== History ==
A bill to make "Patriots of Micronesia" the national anthem was introduced in 1987, and the anthem was adopted in 1991, replacing "Preamble", the state anthem in use since independence in 1979. The melody is that of the German student song "Ich hab' mich ergeben" with lyrics by Hans Ferdinand Massmann (also known as "Wir hatten gebauet ein stattliches Haus" with lyrics by August Daniel von Binzer), which was also one of the unofficial national anthems of West Germany between 1949 and 1952. The lyrics are also loosely based on a translation of "Ich hab' mich ergeben".

== Lyrics ==
I
'Tis here we are pledging, (Note: "'Tis" is sometimes written "this".)
With heart and with hand, (Note: "Hand" is sometimes written "hands".)
𝄆 Full measure of devotion
To thee, our native land. 𝄇

II
Now all join the chorus,
Let union abide.
𝄆 Across all Micronesia
Join hands on every side. 𝄇

III
We all work together,
With heart, voice and hand, (Note: "Heart" is sometimes written "hearts".)
𝄆 Till we have made these islands
Another promised land. 𝄇

(Full measure of devotion
To thee, our native land.
Across all Micronesia
Join hands on every side.
Till we have made these islands
Another promised land.)
