= Anton Dietrich =

German painter (1833–1904)

Anton Dietrich (27 May 1833 – 4 August 1904) was a German painter who focused on murals, particularly frescos.

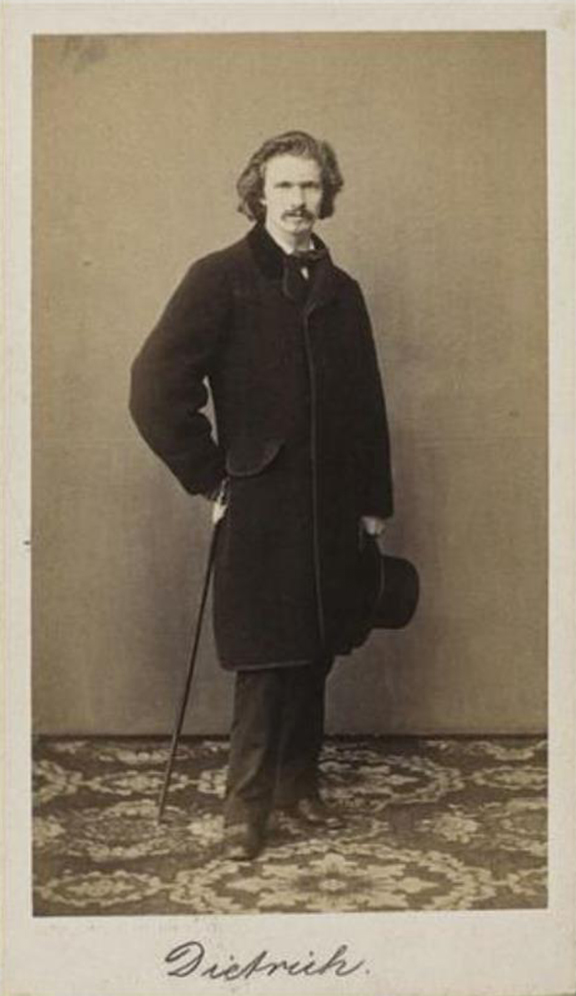
Anton Dietrich (c.1870)

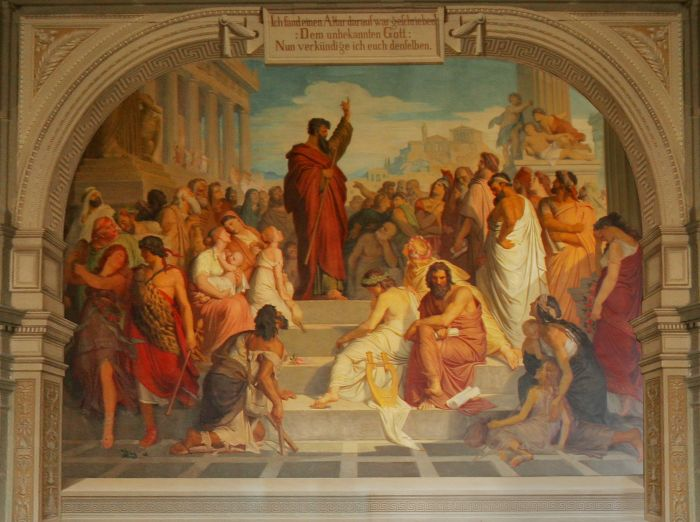
Paul Preaches at the Areopagus in Athens, wall fresco in the auditorium of the Christian Weise Gymnasium in Zittau, Saxony

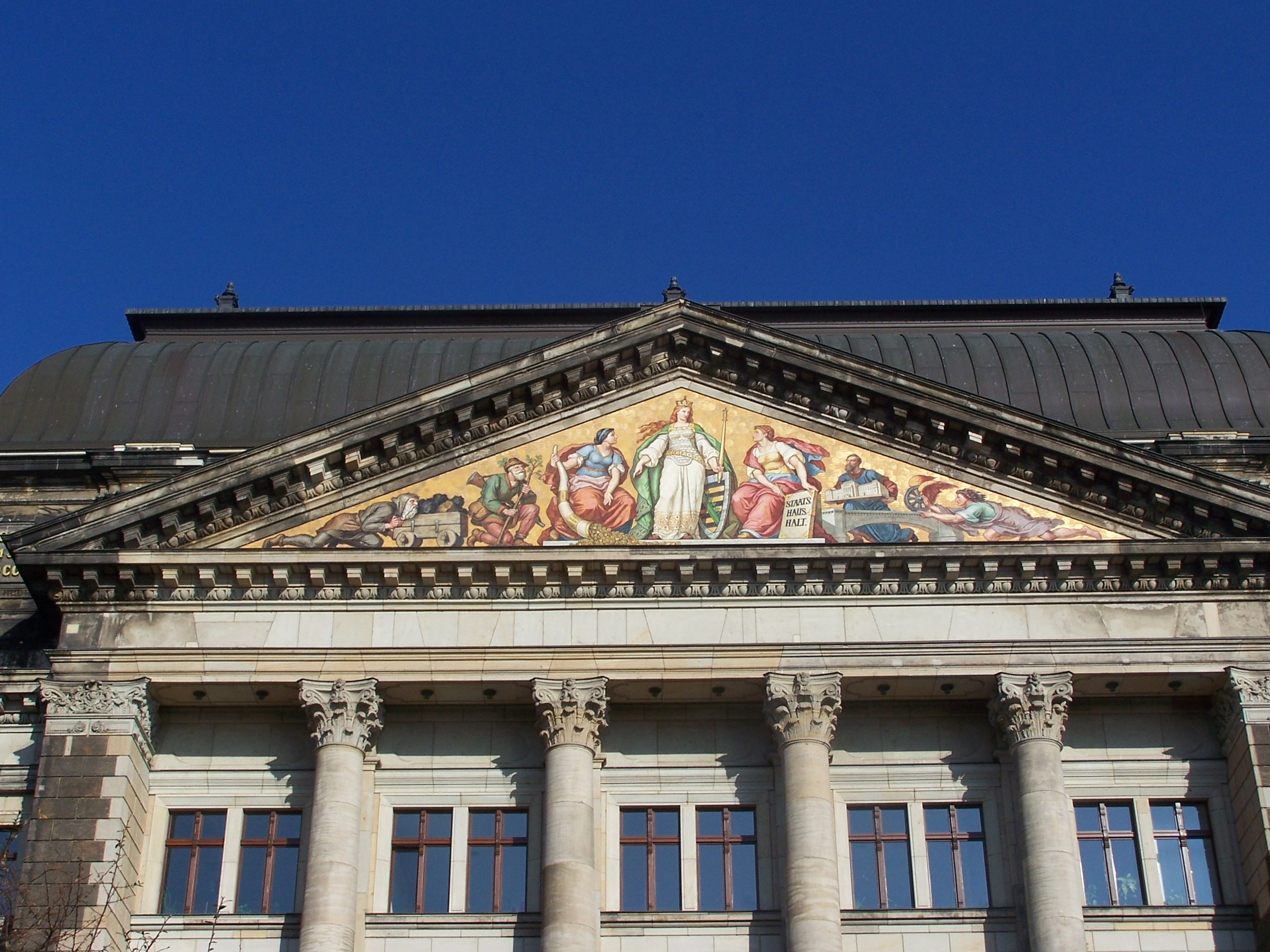
Triangular panel representing Saxonia

== Biography ==
Born in Meissen, Dietrich joined the Dresden Academy of Fine Arts at age 14 and studied sculpture under Ernst Julius Hähnel. In 1848 he made his debut at an exhibition held by the academy. He became a student of the painter Eduard Bendemann in that same year, but a short time later Dietrich moved, together with Leonhard Gey, to work in the studios of Julius Schnorr von Carolsfeld. Despite positive reviews, Dietrich was unable to make a living as a freelance artist, so he also worked as an illustrator for various publishers and art dealers.

Dietrich learned fresco techniques from Carl von Binzer and for a short time, was a master student of Von Carolsfeld. One of his first great works was Rudolf von Habsburg on the Corpse of the Ottoman of Bohemia which premiered at an exhibition and earned him an academic travel grant. With this financial support, Dietrich moved to Düsseldorf from 1859 to 1860, where he became associated with the Düsseldorf school of painting. From there he traveled to Italy, including Venice, Rome, and Naples. On his way home he stopped for several weeks in Munich and returned to Dresden in 1865.

Dietrich founded a studio in Dresden, where he created one of the first works of his series on Otto I, Holy Roman Emperor. Photographs of these works were soon circulated in large quantities. From 1868 to 1872 Dietrich was engaged in a commission to embellish the Gothic Hall of the Kreuzschule with historical frescoes. In 1878 he completed another commission, the fresco Paul Preaches at the Areopagus in Athens, based on Acts chapter 17, verses 22–23. Dietrich also created the image on the gable of the Saxony Ministry of Finance building, which was built in 1894. It represents Saxonia surrounded by arts and government revenues.

Dietrich took a position at the Hochschule für Grafik und Buchkunst Leipzig (HGB) (Academy of Visual Arts in Leipzig), where he died at the age of 71 on 4 August 1904.

== Selected works ==
- Rudolf von Habsburg on the Corpse of the Ottoman of Bohemia
- Otto the Great (series)
- Paul Preaches at the Areopagus in Athens – mural in the auditorium of the Christian Weise Gymnasium in Zittau, Saxony
- Henry I – fresco in Albrecht Castle, Meissen
- Christ Calming the Tempest – inspired a stained glass window in Stanford Memorial Church

== See also ==
- List of German painters
