= Belau rekid =

National anthem of Palau

English: Our Palau
- National anthem of Palau
- Lyrics: Riosang Salvador, Kebekol Alfonso, Hermana Umetaro, Demei Otobed, Sister Ingelore Lengling, Rev. Hubert E. Charles, Fr. Felix Yaoch
- Music: Ymesei O. Ezekiel
- Adopted: 1 January 1981

Audio sample
- U.S. Navy Band instrumental version (one verse): file; help

"Belau rekid" (Palauan pronunciation: [bɛlau̯ ɾəgið]; also spelt "Belau Er Kid"; English: "Our Palau") is the national anthem of Palau. Officially adopted in 1981, the music was composed by Ymesei O. Ezekiel, to which the combined words of several authors were set.

== History ==
The anthem was composed by Ymesei Ezekiel (9 January 1921 – 20 May 1984), a composer, musician and music teacher, during the time of the transition from the Trust Territory of the Pacific Islands, which at the time was using the anthem of Micronesia, to the establishment of the Republic of Palau under the trust territory. A committee headed by member of the House of Delegates Demei Otobed was established to adopt a national anthem in line with the new constitution. Along with Otobed and Ezekiel, other members of the committee included historians and musicians Riosang Salvador, Kebekol Alfonso and Hermana Umetaro. The committee members collectively wrote the lyrics of the anthem. The anthem was officially adopted on 1 January 1981, when the Palauan constitution entered into force.

== Lyrics ==
Palauan original

I
Belau loba klisiich er a kelulul,
El di mla ngar ngii ra rechuodel mei
Meng mengeluolu era chimol beluu,
El ngar eungel a rirch el lomekesang.

II
Bodo leketek a keruul era beluad,
Lolab a blak el reng ma duch el reng.
Belau a chotil a klengar re kid,
Me bodo rurt a bedul msa klisichel.

III
Bo dekaiuereked chim lokiu a reng,
E do ngedmokl era di mla koted.
Lomecheliu a rengedel ma klebkellel,
Lokiu a budech ma beltik el reng.

IV
Dios mo mekngeltengat ra belumam,
El di mla dikesam ra rechuodel mei,
Beskemam a klisicham ma llemeltam,
Lorrurt a klungiolam el mo cherechar.

IPA transcription (Note: See Help:IPA, Palauan language § Phonology and Palauan language § Writing system.)

1
[bɛ.lau̯ lo.ba kli.siːʔ ɛɾ‿a‿ʁ̞ə.lu.lul]
[ɛl di mla ɴaɾ(ə) ɴiː ɾa ɾə.ʔu̯o.ðəl mɛi̯]
[məɴ mə.ɴə.lu̯o.lu ə.ɾa ʔi.mol bə.luː]
[ɛl ɴaɾ(ə) ɛu̯.ɴɛl a ɾiɾ(ə)ʔ əl lo.mə.ʁ̞ə.saɴ]

2
[bo.ðo lə.ʁ̞ɛ.təʁ̞‿a‿ʁ̞ə.ɹuːl ɛ.ɾa bə(l).lu̯að]
[lo.lab a blaʁ̞‿əl‿ɹɛɴ ma‿ðuʔ əl‿ɹɛɴ]
[bɛ.lau̯ a ʔo.til a klə.ɴaɹ‿ɹə gið]
[mɛ bo.ðo ɹuɹt a bə.ðul m.sa kli.si.ʔɛl]

3
[bo‿ðə.ʁ̞ai̯.u̯ə.ɾɛ.ʁ̞ə.ðə ʔim lo.giu̯ a ɾɛɴ]
[ɛ‿ðo ɴəd.mokl ə.ɹa di mla‿ʁ̞o.tɛð]
[lo.mə.ʔə.liu̯ a ɾə.ɴə.ðɛl ma kləb.kəl.lɛl]
[lo.giu̯ a bu.ðə.ʔə ma bəl.dig əl‿ɹɛɴ]

4
[di̯os mo məɢ.ɴəl.də.ɴat (ə)ɾa bɛ.lu.mam]
[ɛl di mla‿ði.ʁ̞ə.sam(ə) ɾa ɾə.ʔu̯o.ðəl mɛi̯]
[bəs.kə.mam a kli.si.ʔam ma lːə.məl.tam]
[lo.ɹuɹt a klu.ɴi̯o.lam əl mo ʔə.ɾə.ʔaɹ]

English version

I
Palau is coming forth with strength and power,
By the old ways abides still every hour.
One country, safe, secure, one government
Under the glowing, floating soft light stands.

II
Let's build our economy's protecting fence
With courage, faithfulness and diligence
Our life is anchored in Palau, our land
We with our might through life and death defend

III
In spirit let's join hands, united, one
Care for our homeland...from forefathers on
Look after its concord, its glory keep
Through peace and love and heart's devotion deep

IV
God bless our country, our island home always
Our sweet inheritances from the ancient days
Give us strength and power and all of the rights
To govern with all eternity with might
