= Johann Gottlieb Fleischer =

German botanist and ornithologist (1797–1838)

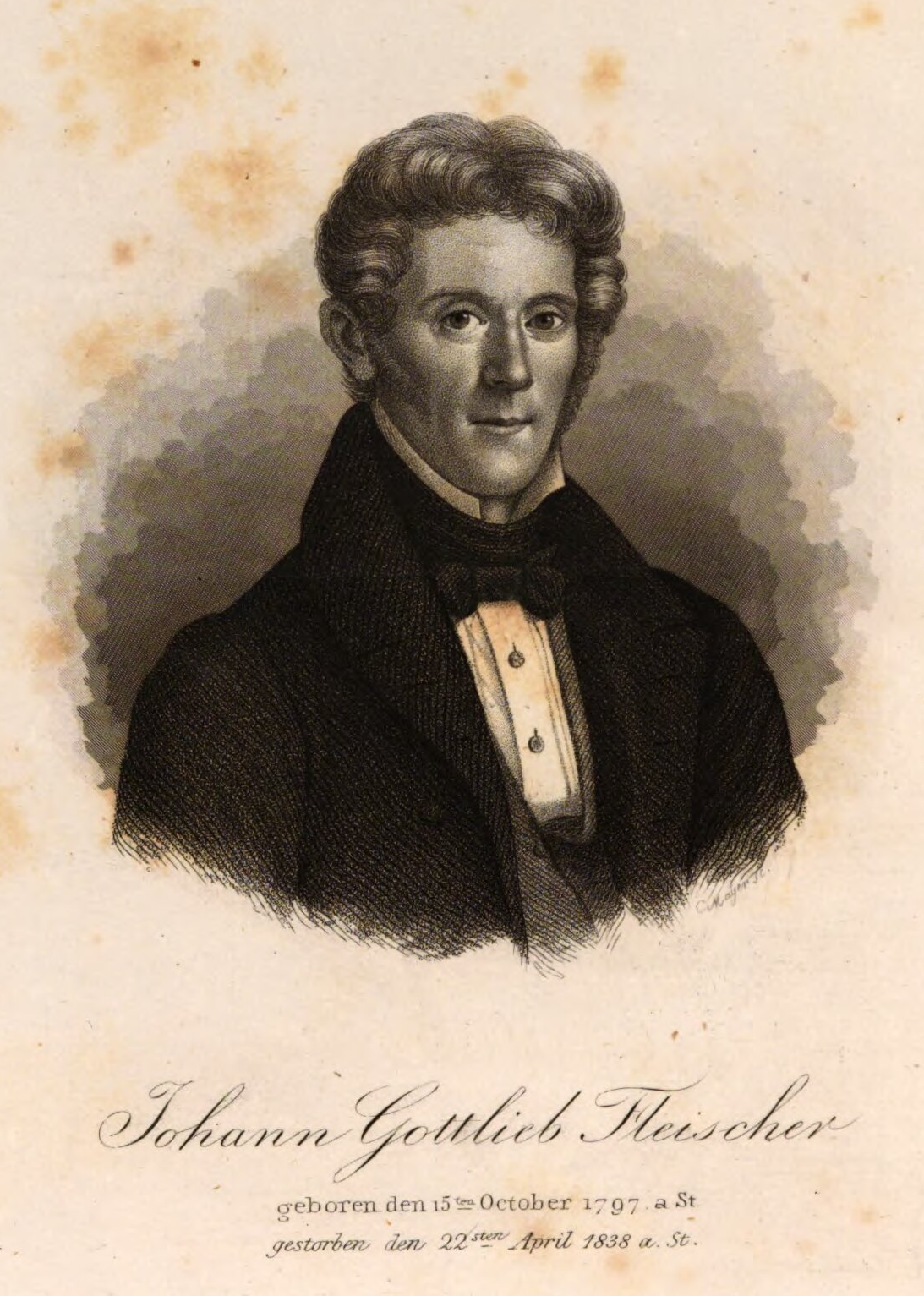

Johann Gottlieb Fleischer (15 October 1797 – 22 April 1838) was a Baltic German botanist and naturalist.

Fleischer was the son of a coppersmith and was born in Mitau. He studied at the local grammar school before studying medicine at the University of Dorpat from 1817 to 1822. He received a doctorate with a thesis on Aneurysmatis varicosi complicati historia. He then worked as a physician in Mitau. He wrote on the flora and fauna of the region collaborating with Emanuel Lindemann (1795–1845) and Alexander Bunge on plants. Hie died from tuberculosis.

A member of the Moscow Imperial Society of Naturalists and the Courland Society for Literature and Art he attended a meeting of German naturalists at Hamburg in 1830.

== Works ==
- with C. P. Laurop and V. F. Fischer: Sylvan, ein Jahrbuch fur Forstmänner, Jäger und Jagdfreunde (1813 to 1822);
- with E. Lindemann: Flora der deutschen Ostseeprovinzen Esth-, Liv- und Kurland. Mitau, Leipzig (1839);
- with A. Bunge: Fleischer, Johann Gottlieb: Flora von Esth-, Liv- und Kurland Flora von Esth-, Liv- und Kurland. Mitau, Leipzig (1853).
