= Christian Peter Laurop =

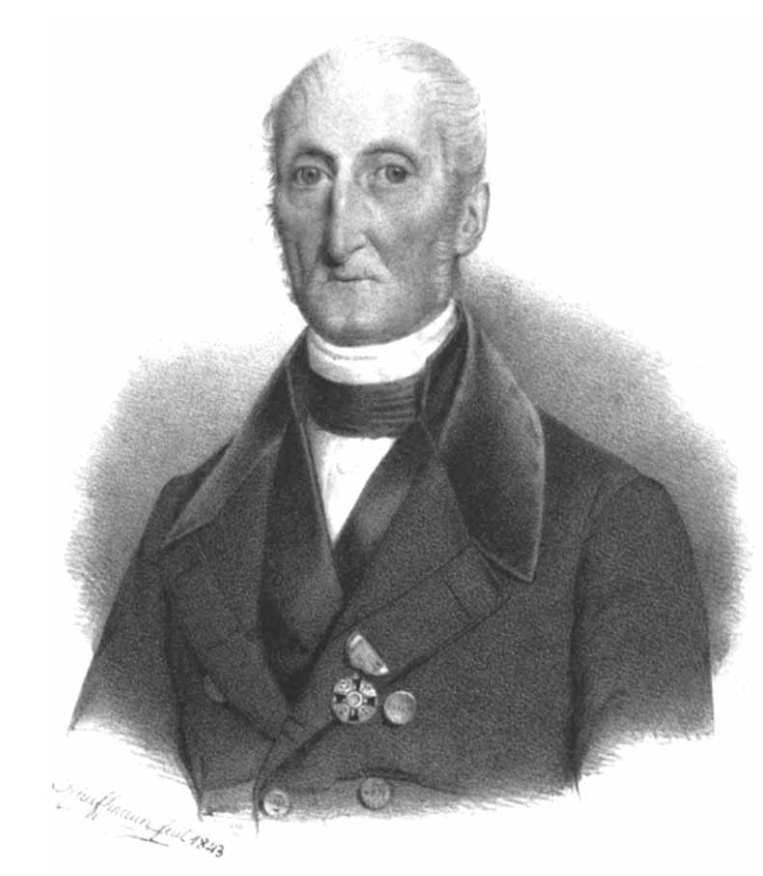
Portrait engraving, 1843

Christian Peter Laurop (1 April 1772 – 13 May 1858) was a Danish-German forester. He taught forestry and edited the forestry periodicals Sylvan and the Annalen der Societät der Forst- und Jagdkunde zu Dreißigacker. He has been considered a pioneer of forest measurement.

== Life and work ==
Laurop was born in Schleswig where his father Wilhelm Moritz Gottfried Laurop (1722–1795) was a forester in the Danish royal service. His mother was Catharina Lucia Borchardts (1737–1811). He studied in the Schleswig Cathedral School and went to train in forestry, apprenticing in 1788 with the Hessian forester Conrad Bernhard Müller (1726–1795) in Steinau. He received support from Jägermeister (master of the hunt) Carl von Warnstedt (1750–1811). He returned in 1790 travelling through the Harz Mountains and studying the forest management of the Counts of Stolberg-Wernigerode, particularly Friedrich Wilhelm Christian von (dem) Hagen (1754–1827). He worked with mounted military police in Kiel and studied forestry at a school of forestry that had been founded in 1787 by August Christian Heinrich Niemann (1761–1832). In 1795 he quit military service and trained as an assistant to the hunt master of Warnstedt. He received a royal scholarship which allowed him to travel widely and meet German foresters. In 1800 he worked in Copenhagen for Christian Detlev von Reventlow (1748–1827). In 1802 he began to teach forestry at the Dreißigacker Academy which was founded by Johann Matthäus Bechstein. In 1803 he married Margaretha Dorothea Jacobina (1775–1861), daughter of physician Johann Jacob Bendixen (1741–1796). In 1893 he was also made a cameralist to the Duke and in 1895 he moved to Amorbach in the service of Carl Friedrich Wilhelm, the 1st Prince of Leiningen (1724–1807) and in 1897 as part of service under the Grand Duchy of Baden. He moved to Karlsruhe where he was a chief forester. He retired in 1842 but continued to give lectures at the polytechnic.

Laurop was knighted with the cross of the order of the Zähringer Löwen from Grand Duke Leopold of Baden in 1838. He died in Karlsruhe.
