= Tragic Overture (Brahms) =

1880 concert overture for orchestra by Johannes Brahms

- by Johannes Brahms
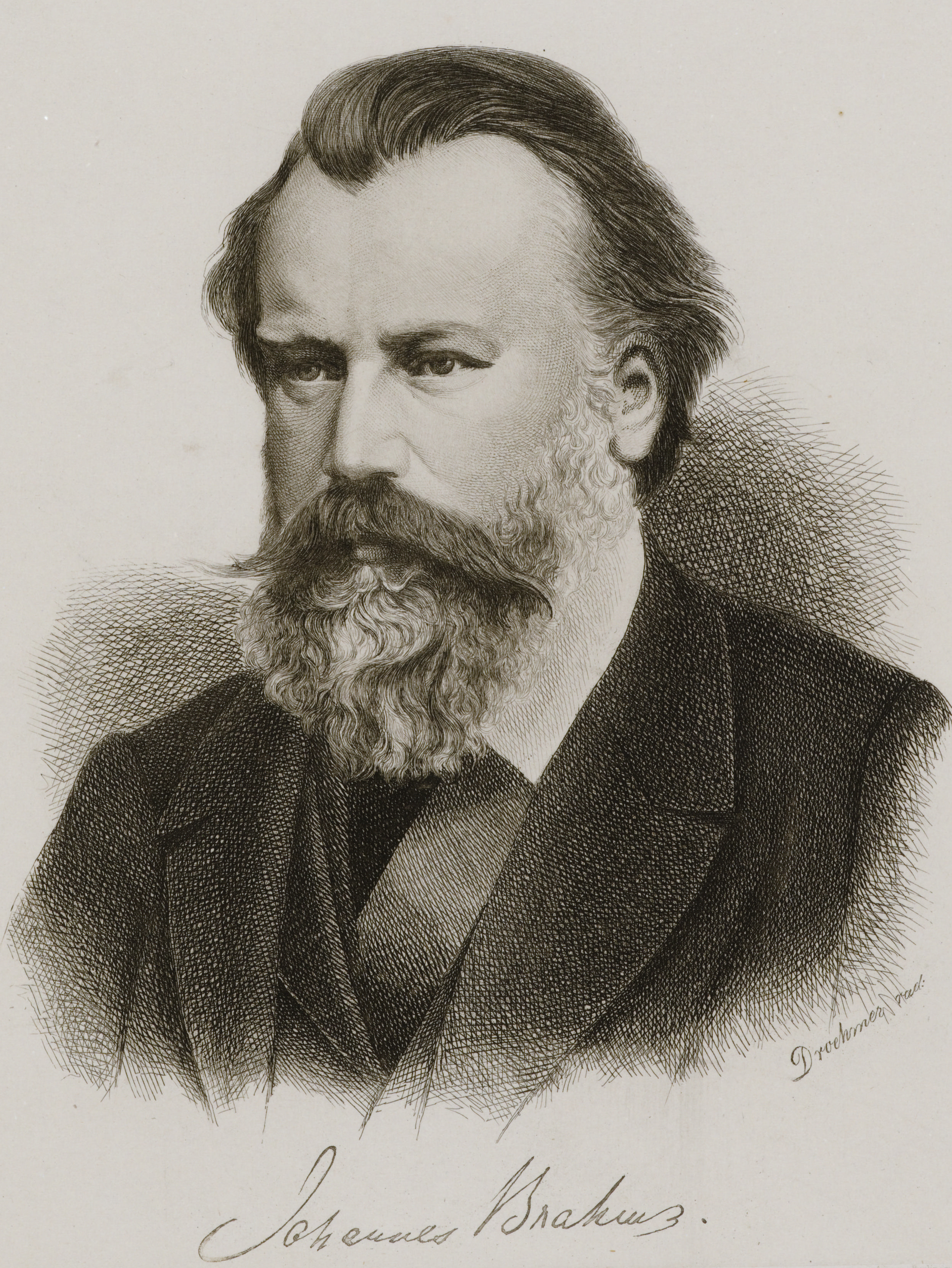
- Brahms in 1882
- Native name: Tragische Ouvertüre
- Key: D minor
- Opus: Op. 81
- Composed: 1880
- Duration: ~ 13 minutes
- Movements: Four continuous sections
- Scoring: Symphony orchestra

Premiere
- Date: 26 December 1880
- Location: Vienna

The Tragic Overture (German: Tragische Ouvertüre) in D minor, Op. 81, is a concert overture for orchestra written by Johannes Brahms during the summer of 1880. It premiered, under Hans Richter, on 26 December 1880 in Vienna. Most performances last between twelve and fifteen minutes.

Brahms chose the title "tragic" to emphasize the turbulent, tormented character of the piece, in essence a free-standing symphonic movement, in contrast to the mirthful ebullience of a companion piece he wrote the same year, the Academic Festival Overture. Despite its name, the Tragic Overture does not follow any specific dramatic program. Brahms summed up the effective difference in character between the two overtures when he declared "one is laughing, the other crying."

== Structure ==
Tragic Overture (13:50)

The Tragic Overture comprises three main sections, all in the key of D minor.

1. Allegro ma non troppo
2. Molto più moderato
3. Tempo primo ma tranquillo

Theorists have disagreed in analyzing the form of the piece: Jackson finds Webster's multifarious description rather obscurist and prefers to label the work's form as a "reversed sonata design" in which the second group is recapitulated before the first, with Beethoven's Coriolan Overture as a possible formal model.

== Instrumentation ==
The work is scored for piccolo, two flutes, two oboes, two clarinets, two bassoons, four horns, two trumpets, three trombones, tuba, timpani, and strings.
