= August Daniel von Binzer =

German poet, journalist and Urburschenschafter

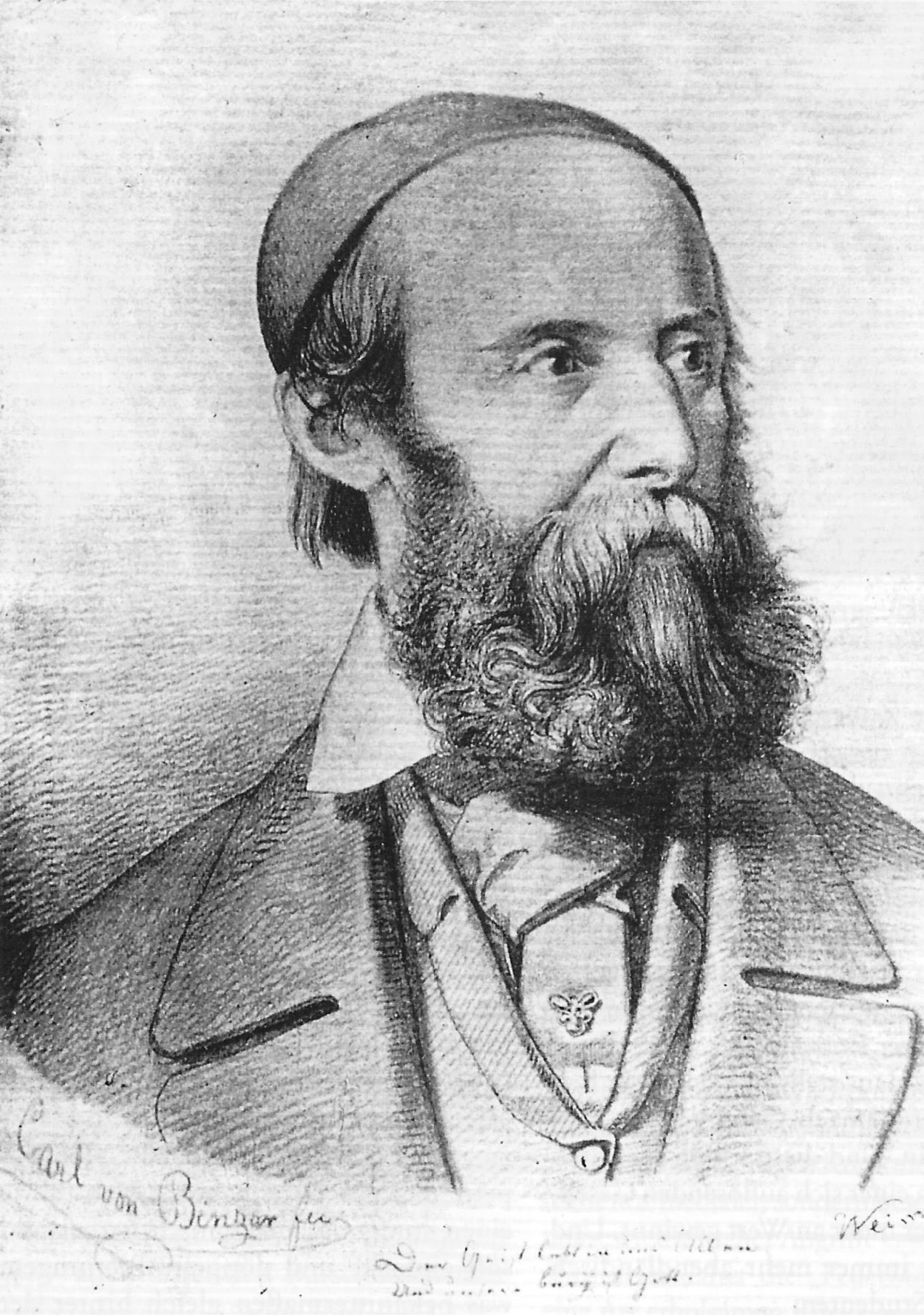
- Born: 30 May 1793; Kiel, Duchy of Holstein (now Germany)
- Died: 20 March 1868 (aged 74); Neisse, Silesia, Prussia (now Poland)
- Occupation: Writer
- Years active: 1817 - 1868

August Freiherr von Binzer (30 May 1793 – 20 March 1868) was a German poet, journalist, and Urburschenschafter.

== Early life and education ==
Binzer was born in Kiel and studied at the Christian-Albrechts-University Kiel and the University of Jena. In 1817 he was the founding father of the Burschenschaftlichen movement in Kiel, where he became a member of the fraternity Teutonia in Kiel. In Jena, he joined the Urburschenschaft. He took part in the Wartburg Festival of 1817.

== Career ==
He became known through two of his songs, "Impact!" (Stoßt an!, 1817) and "Wir hatten gebauet ein stattliches Haus" (1819). The second song was written to dissolve the Jena Burschenschaft and contains the line "The Band is Cut / Was Red Black and Gold", in which the three colors of the fraternity were first recorded in writing. The latter song was immortalized much later (1881) by Johannes Brahms as a trumpet theme in his Academic Festival Overture. Its tune is now used in the Micronesian national anthem.

As a journalist and writer von Binzer worked in many German cities, including Altenburg, Glücksburg (Baltic Sea), Flensburg, Leipzig, Cologne and Augsburg. He wrote for newspapers, edited encyclopaedias and published stories and short stories .

== Personal life ==
In 1822 von Binzer married the writer, Emilie Henriette Adelheid von Gerschau, who survived him by 21 years. A street in Linz is named after her. Their son, Carl, became a well known landscape painter and author.

== Later life and death ==
His last years he spent in Linz and Styria. He died in Neisse, Silesia.

== Works ==
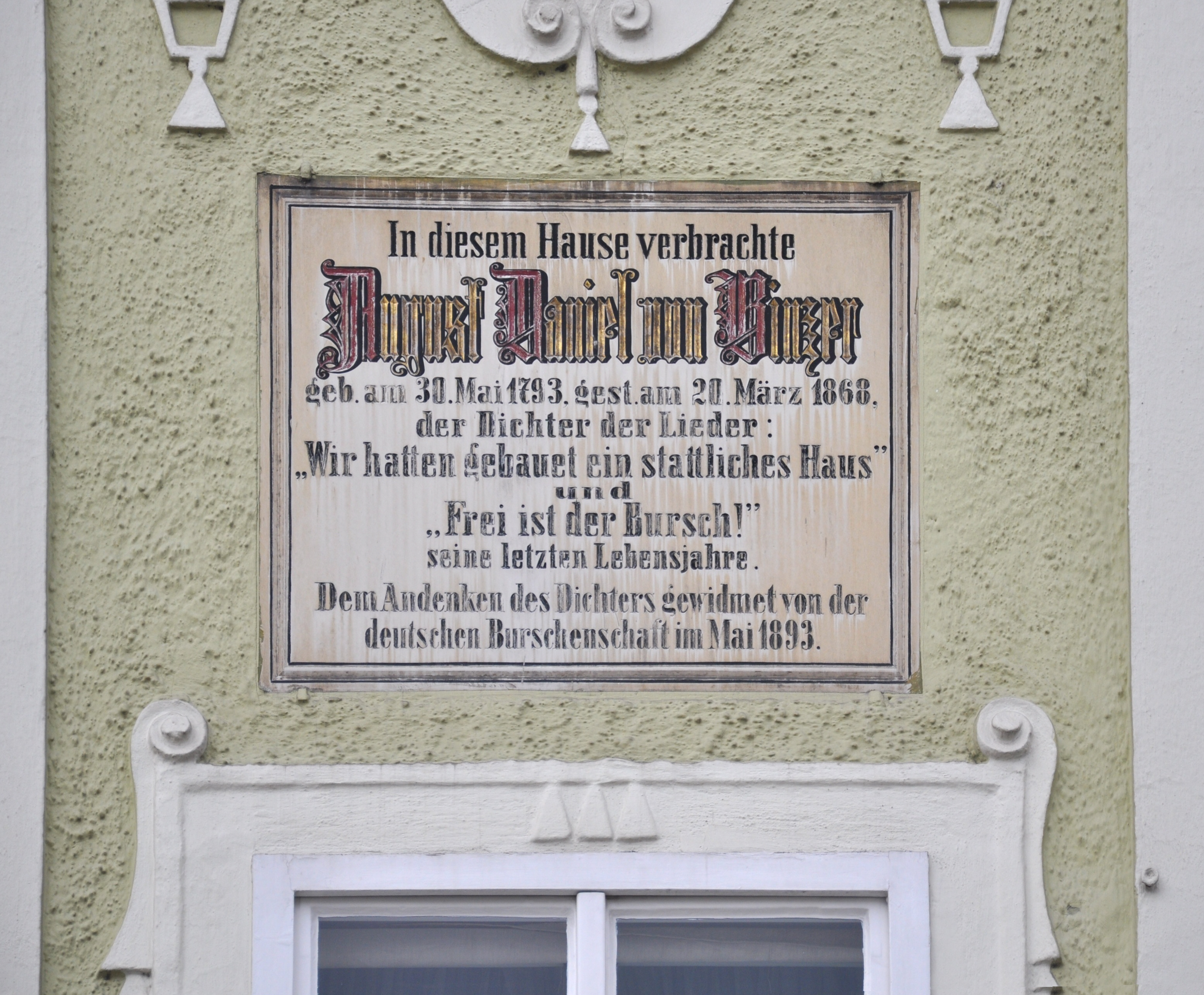
Memorial plaque in Linz.

- Binzer, August Daniel von. Contribution to answering the question: What can currently be done to promote prosperity in Germany? at Google Books 1820.
- Report on the celebrations that took place during the laying of the foundation stone of the German Bookstore Exchange in Leipzig on 26 October 1834.
- August Daniel von Binzer. Venice in 1844. 1845

== Literature ==
- Constantin von Wurzbach : Binzer, August von . In: Biographical Encyclopedia of the Empire of Austria . 22nd part. Imperial Royal Court and State Printing, Vienna 1870, p. 484 ( digitized ).
- Rochus von Liliencron : Binzer, August Daniel Baron von . In: General German Biography (ADB). Volume 2, Duncker & Humblot, Leipzig 1875, p. 653.
- Siegfried Krebs: August Daniel von Binzer or the end of romance. A novel . Fischer, Berlin 1912.
- Kurt Stephenson: Character heads of student music. August Daniel von Binzer - Justus Wilhelm Lyra . In: Paul Wentzcke (ed.): Representations and Sources on the History of the German Unity Movement in the 19th and 20th Centuries . Winter, Heidelberg 1965, Vol. 6, pp. 11–64.
- Kurt Stephenson: August Daniel von Binzer. The demagogue's fate of an apolitical . In: Paul Wentzcke (ed.): Representations and sources on the history of the German Unity Movement in the 19th and 20th centuries . Winter, Heidelberg 1965, Vol. 5, pp. 128–182.
- Günter Steiger: "Was Roth Black and Gold ...". An essay on the history of the Jena fraternity from 1815 to 1819 . Jena 1986.
- Peter Kaupp : The singer of the Urburschenschaft. August Daniel von Binzer (1793-1868). In: SK Student Courier 1/2014 ( Community for German Student History ), pp. 6–7
