= Academic Festival Overture =

1880 concert overture by Brahms

- by Johannes Brahms
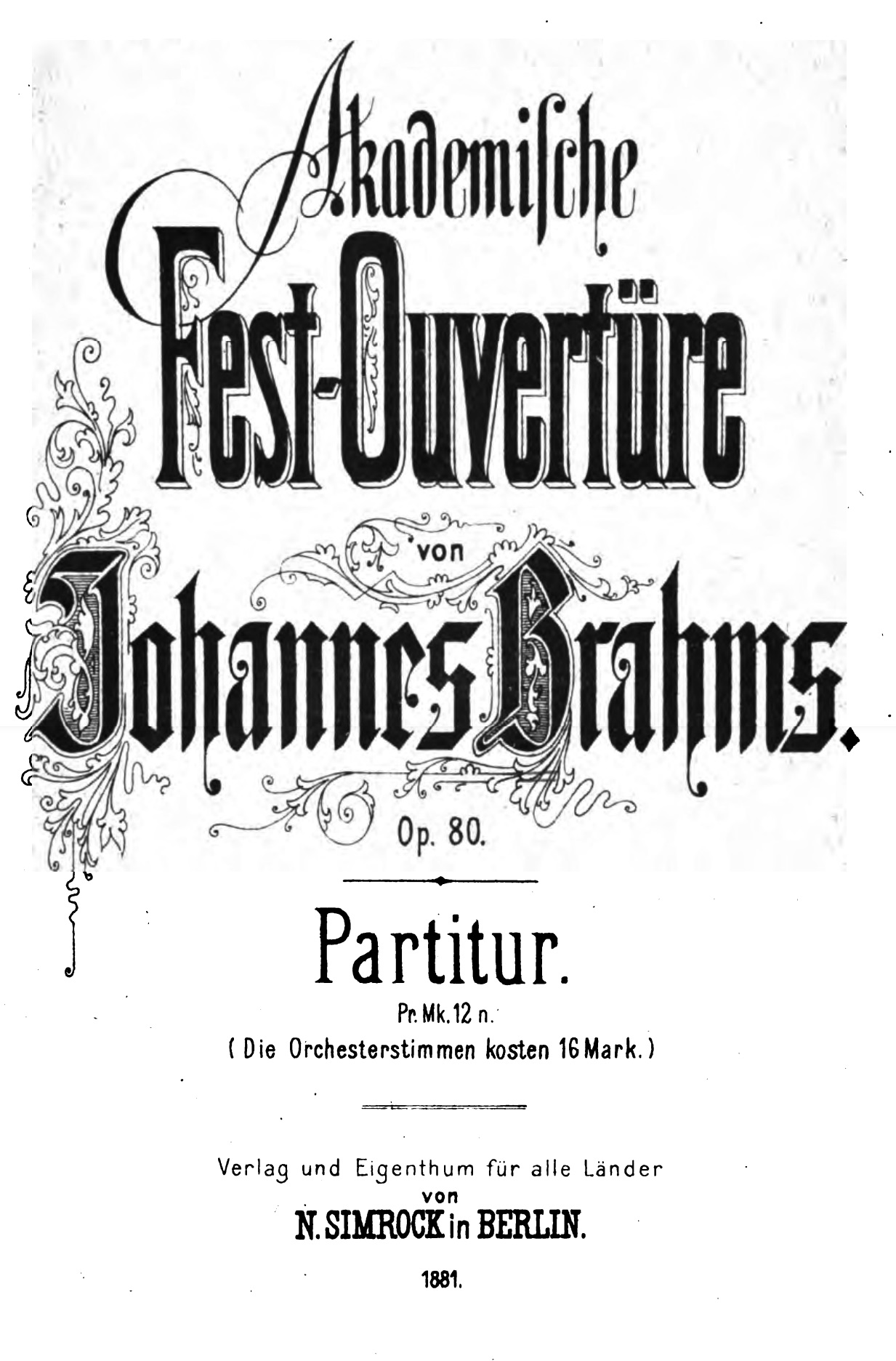
- Title page of score edition 1881
- Native name: Akademische Festouvertüre
- Key: C minor
- Opus: Op. 80
- Genre: Concert overture
- Form: Overture
- Composed: 1880
- Dedication: University of Breslau (honorary doctorate)
- Duration: ~ 10 minutes
- Movements: Four continuous sections
- Scoring: Symphony orchestra

Premiere
- Date: 4 January 1881
- Location: University of Breslau (convocation), Breslau

Academic Festival Overture (German: Akademische Festouvertüre), Op. 80, by Johannes Brahms, was one of a pair of contrasting concert overtures — the other being the Tragic Overture, Op. 81. Brahms composed the work during the summer of 1880 as a tribute to the University of Breslau, which had notified him that it would award him an honorary doctorate in music.

== Background ==
Initially, Brahms had contented himself with sending a simple handwritten note of acknowledgment to the university, since he loathed the public fanfare of celebrity. However, the conductor Bernhard Scholz, who had nominated him for the degree, convinced him that protocol required him to make a grander gesture of gratitude. The university expected nothing less than a musical offering from the composer. "Compose a fine symphony for us!" he wrote to Brahms. "But well orchestrated, old boy, not too uniformly thick!"

== Structure and instrumentation ==
Brahms, who was known to be an ironic joker, filled his quota by creating a "very boisterous potpourri of student drinking songs à la Suppé" in an intricately designed structure made to appear loose and episodic, thus drawing on the "academic" for both his sources and their treatment.

The work sparkles with some of the finest virtues of Brahms's orchestral technique, sometimes applied for comic effect, such as the bassoons that inflate the light subject of "Fuchslied" ("Was kommt dort von der Höh"). The inventive treatment also includes tunes appropriated from the student ditties "Wir hatten gebauet ein stattliches Haus"; "Hört, ich sing das Lied der Lieder"; and most memorably, the broad, triumphant finale on "Gaudeamus igitur", which succinctly engages Brahms's sophisticated mastery of counterpoint, further fulfilling the "academic" aspect of his program, cheekily applied to the well-worn melody. Brahms manages to evoke ravishing euphoria without sacrificing his commitment to classical balance.

The blend of orchestral colors is carefully planned and highlighted in the piece, which, in spite of Scholz's request, calls for one of the largest ensembles for any of his compositions: piccolo, two flutes, two oboes, two clarinets (both doubling in B♭ and C clarinets), two bassoons, contrabassoon, four horns (two in C and two in E), three C trumpets, three trombones, one tuba, timpani, bass drum, cymbals, triangle, and strings.

Academic Festival Overture, Op. 80
Performed by the Vienna Philharmonic under Hans Knappertsbusch, 1957.

The Overture consists of four continuous sections:

1. Allegro (C minor)
2. Maestoso (C major)
3. Animato (G major)
4. Maestoso (C major)

== Convocation for the premiere and awarding of the degree ==
The composer himself conducted the premiere of the overture, and received his honorary degree, at a special convocation held by the University on January 4, 1881. To the chagrin (or mischievous delight) of many of the academics in the audience, there was an "ironic" contrast between the mood of the student drinking songs and the seriousness of a ceremony.

== Reception ==
Because of its easily grasped structure, its lyrical warmth, and its excitement and humor, the work has remained a staple of today's concert-hall repertoire. A typical performance lasts around ten minutes.

== References in popular culture ==
Cary Grant in his role as Dr. Noah Praetorius conducts the Overture at the beginning and end of the 1951 Joseph L. Mankiewicz/Darryl F. Zanuck film People Will Talk, and a pastiche of one section can be heard in the opening theme of the 1978 film National Lampoon's Animal House, an ironic gesture given that this piece was partly based on German fraternity drinking songs.

In the 1967 film Bedazzled, Dudley Moore, as a pretentious pseudo-intellectual Welsh student, and Eleanor Bron lie on the floor listening to the beginning of the Overture on an LP until the record begins to skip (thanks to a scratch deliberately made in the LP by Peter Cook as the Devil earlier in the film).

From its inception to 1982, the Overture has been regularly used by Twin Cities PBS during its station identification and sign-off.

The song "Catch a Falling Star", made famous by Perry Como, was based on the third theme in the final movement (the "Fuchslied"), just before the "Gaudeamus igitur". The final melody provides the tune for Greenleaf High School's school song in the 1997 movie In and Out.
