= Ich hab mich ergeben =

1949–1950 unofficial national anthem of West Germany

English: 'I Have Surrendered'
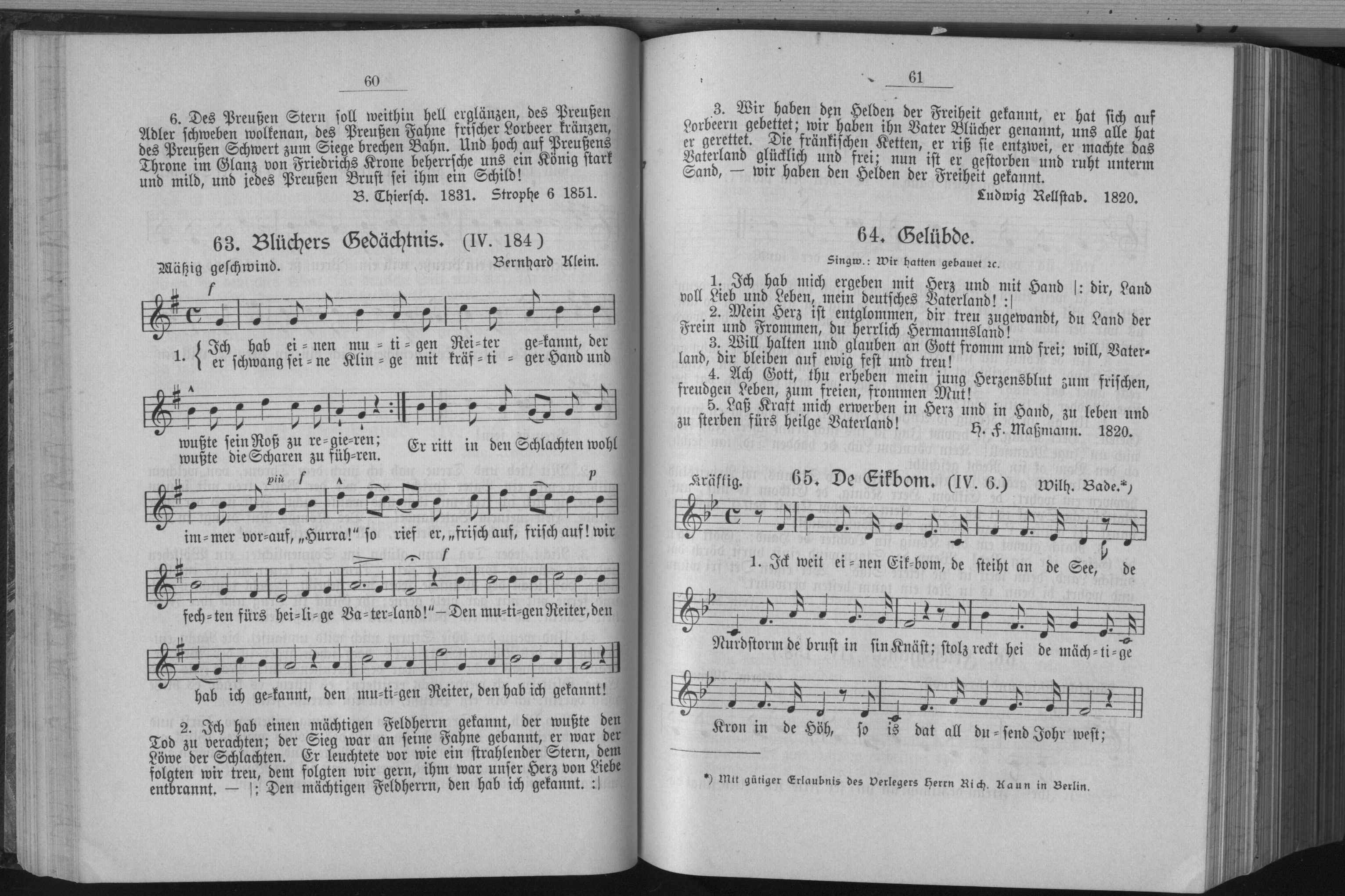
- The text in a collection of Lieder. The title is Gelübde.
- Former national anthem of West Germany
- Also known as: „Gelübde“ (English: 'Vow')
- Lyrics: Hans Ferdinand Maßmann, 1820
- Music: August Daniel von Binzer, 1819
- Adopted: 1949
- Relinquished: 1952
- Preceded by: "Deutschlandlied" and "Horst-Wessel-Lied" (by Germany)
- Succeeded by: "Deutschlandlied"

Audio sample
- U.S. Navy Band instrumental rendition in F major: file; help

Former Deutschlandfunk interval signal

"Ich hab mich ergeben" (German: [ɪç hap mɪç ɛʁˈɡeːbən]; lit. 'I Have Surrendered'), originally titled "Gelübde" (IPA: [ɡəˈlʏbdə]; 'Vow'), is a German patriotic song. The text was written in 1820 by Hans Ferdinand Maßmann.

As singing the traditional anthem, the "Deutschlandlied", starting with the line "Deutschland, Deutschland über alles" ("Germany, Germany above all else"), didn't seem appropriate after Germany's surrender in World War II, the double meaning of the line 'Ich hab mich ergeben', which means 'I have surrendered' in literal translation, but in the context of this song's lyrics also 'I am devoted to thee', made this song one of the favorites as a national anthem in post-war Germany. As such, it was one of the unofficial national anthems of West Germany from 1949 until 1952, and in national radio it was played even since 1945 before intermission. However, public interest in the song declined before the Deutschlandlied was officially reinstated, of which only the third stanza is sung ever since.

The Swedish Christmas song "När juldagsmorgon glimmar" uses the same tune. The tune is also used in the Micronesian national anthem, a cultural realm which has been historically influenced by German colonial presence.

== History ==
The national anthem of the Federated States of Micronesia, "Patriots of Micronesia", uses the same tune, as does the Estonian song "Mu Isamaa armas" ("My beloved native land" by Martin Körber) which used to be Estonia's official flag song until 2009 when it was replaced by Gustav Ernesaks's "Mu Isamaa on minu arm" ("My homeland is my love"). The Latvian song "Šie kauli, šī miesa" also has the same tune. The melody is quoted by Johannes Brahms in his Academic Festival Overture. The Deutschlandfunk used the motif to the words "dir Land voll Lieb und Leben" as its interval signal.

The second stanza includes the words "land of the free", similar to the well-known words of "The Star-Spangled Banner", written eight years earlier.

== Lyrics ==
German original

I
Ich hab mich ergeben
mit Herz und mit Hand,
𝄆 Dir Land voll Lieb' und Leben,
mein deutsches Vaterland! 𝄇

II
Mein Herz ist entglommen,
dir treu zugewandt,
𝄆 Du Land der Frei'n und Frommen,
du herrlich Hermannsland! 𝄇

III
Will halten und glauben
an Gott fromm und frei;
𝄆 Will Vaterland dir bleiben
auf ewig fest und treu. 𝄇

IV
Ach Gott, tu' erheben
mein jung Herzensblut
𝄆 Zu frischem freud'gem Leben,
zu freiem frommem Mut! 𝄇

V
Laß Kraft mich erwerben
in Herz und in Hand,
𝄆 Zu leben und zu sterben
fürs heil'ge Vaterland! 𝄇

English translation

I
I am devoted to thee
with heart and hand,
𝄆 Thou land of love and life,
my German Fatherland! 𝄇

II
My hearth doth glow,
loyally turned towards thee,
𝄆 Thou land of the free and faithful,
thou glorious Hermann's land! 𝄇

III
I will hold and believe
in God faithfully and free;
𝄆 Fatherland will forever remain
steadfast and loyal to thee! 𝄇

IV
O God, lift up the blood
of my young heart.
𝄆 Towards fresh joyful life,
towards free and faithful courage! 𝄇

V
Let me gain strength
in heart and hand,
𝄆 To live and die
for the holy Fatherland! 𝄇

== Melody ==
Arrangement: Friedrich Gernsheim: "125 Gelübde", in Volksliederbuch für Männerchor, vol. 1, Leipzig, C. F. Peters 1906.

== "Wir hatten gebauet" ==
The music had originally been composed for another patriotic song by August Daniel von Binzer, "Wir hatten gebauet ein stattliches Haus" (1819). Some sources state that in this song the colours Black, Red, and Gold are mentioned for the first time in this order which is not true. In 1817, Binzer had written a different song that begins with the words "Stoßt an! Schwarz-Rot-Gold lebe!" (Let's toast! May Black, Red and Gold live!)

The song's first performance took place on 27 January 1819 after the forced dissolution of the Urburschenschaft. Around one year later, he wrote it down in the register of the participants of the 1817 Wartburg Festival. There, he called the tune a "Thuringian folk song", but no evidence of such earlier melody exists. The lyrics were published for the first time in the Kieler Commers- und Liederbuch in 1821, the tune followed in 1825.

The text refers to the dissolution of the Urburschenschaft ("A noble house") due to the Carlsbad Decrees. During the Vormärz, censorship often replaced the colours with lines.

German original

I
Wir hatten gebauet
Ein stattliches Haus
Und drin auf Gott vertrauet
Trotz Wetter, Sturm und Graus.

II
Wir lebten so traulich,
So innig, so frei,
Den Schlechten ward es graulich,
Wir lebten gar zu treu.

III
Sie lugten, sie suchten
Nach Trug und Verrat,
Verleumdeten, verfluchten
Die junge, grüne Saat.

IV
Was Gott in uns legte,
Die Welt hat's veracht't,
Die Einigkeit erregte
Bei Guten selbst Verdacht.

V
Man schalt es Verbrechen,
Man täuschte sich sehr;
Die Form kann man zerbrechen,
Die Liebe nimmermehr.

VI
Die Form ist zerbrochen,
Von außen herein,
Doch was man drin gerochen,
War eitel Dunst und Schein.

VII
Das Band ist zerschnitten,
War schwarz, rot und gold,
Und Gott hat es gelitten,
Wer weiß, was er gewollt.

VIII
Das Haus mag zerfallen.
Was hat's dann für Not?
Der Geist lebt in uns allen,
Und unsre Burg ist Gott!

English translation

I
We had built
A stately house
And trusted in God therein
Despite tempest, storm and horror.

II
We lived so cozily,
So devotedly, so free,
To the wicked 'twas abhorrent,
We lived far too faithfully.

III
They peered, they looked
For deceit and treachery,
Slandered, cursed
The young, green seed.

IV
What God put inside us,
The world hath despised.
This unity stirred suspicion
Even among good people.

V
People reviled it as crime,
They deluded themselves badly;
They can shatter the form,
But never the love.

VI
The form is shattered,
From out to within,
But inside it they smelled
Sheer haze and appearance.

VII
The riband is cut to pieces,
'Twas black, red and gold,
And God allowed it,
Who knows what He wanted.

VIII
The house may collapse.
Would it matter?
The spirit lives within us all,
And our fortress is God!
