= Preamble (anthem) =

First national anthem of Micronesia

- Former national anthem of the Federated States of Micronesia
- Adopted: 1979
- Relinquished: 1991
- Succeeded by: "Patriots of Micronesia"

Audio sample
- file; help

"Preamble" was the first national anthem of the Federated States of Micronesia. It was adopted in 1979 and replaced in 1991 by "Patriots of Micronesia".

The title refers to the preamble of Micronesia's freshly ratified constitution, from which the lyrics are largely derived.

== Lyrics ==
We people of Micronesia
Exercise sov'reignty.
Establish our Constitution
Of Federated States.
Affirm our common wish to live
In peace and harmony.
To preserve heritage of past
And promise of future.

Chorus:
Make one nation of many isles,
Diversity of our cultures.
Our diff'rences Will enrich us,
Waters bring us All together.
They don't sep'rate.
They sustain us.
Our Islands Our nation
Get larger And make us stronger
And make us much stronger.

Our Ancestors made their homes here,
Displaced no other man,
We who remain wish unity,
Been ruled we seek freedom,
Our days began when men explored
Seas in rafts and canoes.
Our nation born when men voyaged
The seas via the stars.

Chorus

The world itself is an island
We seen from all nations.
Peace, friendship, co-operation,
Love and humanity.
With this Constitution,
We now become proud guardian
Of our beautiful islands.
Now on forever more.

Chorus
