= August Christian Niemann =

German author (1761–1832)

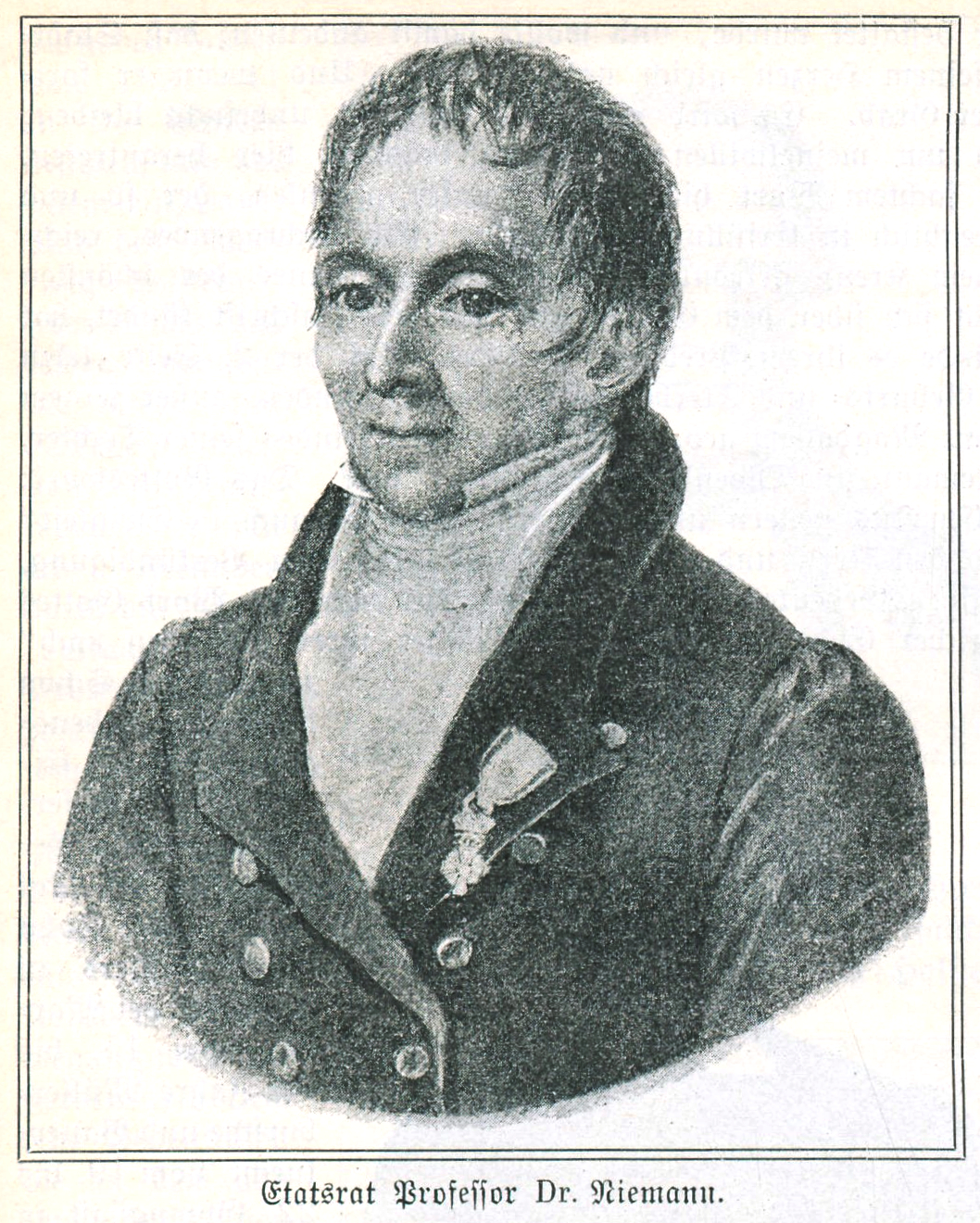

August Christian Heinrich Niemann (30 January 1761 – 21 May 1832) was a German forestry engineer and political economist. He is known as a composer and collector of student songs.

Born in Altona, he studied law in Jena and Kiel. Serving as Hofmeister for a fellow student of noble background, he moved to the University of Göttingen in 1782. He returned to Kiel in 1783, where he received his PhD, and lectured on statistics and political science from 1785.

His "academic songbook" (Akademisches Liederbuch), published in 1782, contained some of his own compositions. It was successful, a second volume being published in 1795. Niemann's song Landesvater, Schutz und Rater became standard part of the Landesvater ceremony, a ritual pledge of friendship practiced by German academic fraternities. He was also the first to set German-language lyrics to the tune of "God Save the King", in his "Heil, unserm Bunde Heil", a patriotic song and early expression of Pan-German nationalism. This example would be imitated in various German patriotic songs and anthems during the 19th century, most notably in "Heil dir im Siegerkranz", the royal anthem of Prussia and later the imperial anthem of the German Empire.

Niemann became extraordinary professor at Kiel University, director of the newly formed forestry institute, in 1787. He was made ordinary professor in 1794, and he served as rector of Kiel University in the academic years 1811/12 and 1829/30. Niemann established the Kiel tree nursery (Forstbaumschule Kiel) in 1788.

Niemann was active co-founder of a charitable organisation supporting the poor, the Gesellschaft freiwilliger Armenfreunde. The city of Kiel named Niemannsweg in his honour, on 4 June 1869.

== Bibliography ==
Songbooks

- 1782 Akademisches Liederbuch
- 1783 Notenbuch zu des akademischen Liederbuchs erstem Bändchen
- 1795 Akademisches Liederbuch, vol. 2
- 1825 Wald und Wild: Allgemeines Liederbuch für Deutschlands Forst- und Weidmänner

Political economy

- 1784 Von der Industrie, ihren Hindernissen und Beförderungsmitteln
- 1796 Grundsätze der Staatswirthschaft
- 1796 Übersicht der Sicherungsmittel gegen Feuersgefahren und Feuersbrünste
- 1799 Handbuch der schleswig-holsteinischen Landeskunde
- 1801 Schleswig-holsteinische Vaterlandskunde
- 1823 Nebenstunden für die innere Staatenkunde

Forestry

- 1791 Sammlungen zur Forstgeographie
- 1814 Inbegriff der Forstwissenschaft
- 1820–1822 Vaterländische Waldberichte
