= Carl von Binzer =

German painter and author

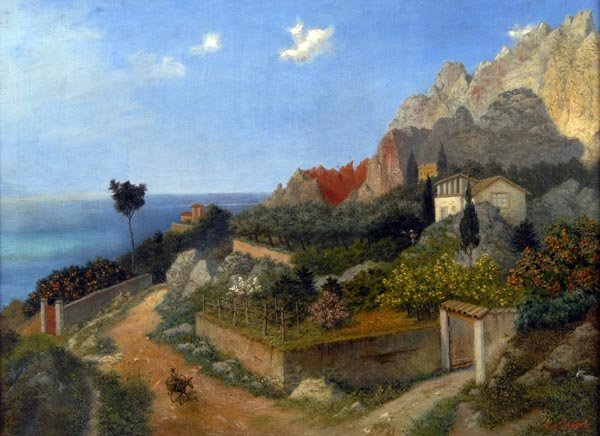
Italian Landscape

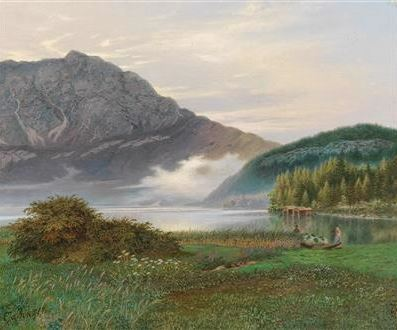
A View from Altaussee

Carl Heinrich Friedrich Freiherr von Binzer (19 October 1824 – 22 July 1902) was a German painter and author.

== Biography ==
He was born in Glücksburg. His father, August Daniel von Binzer, was a poet and journalist. His mother was the author Emilie Henriette Adelheid von Gerschau, who wrote under the name "Ernst Ritter". While he was growing up, his parents led an unsettled, wandering life, until they went to Austria and found a home in Altaussee. On his father's advice, Binzer studied law in Bonn and became a member of the Burschenschaft there in 1845. The subject of law proved to be of little interest to him, however, and he left school to study art at the Royal Academy of Fine Arts in Antwerp. In 1849, after a brief period of military service, he was admitted to the Academy of Fine Arts, Munich, where he studied with Wilhelm von Kaulbach and Moritz von Schwind.

In 1852, he travelled to Rome with August Emil Braun, Director of the German Archaeological Institute, where he found an apartment in the residence of the Austrian Ambassador; entertaining numerous Austrian and German artists who were studying in Italy. His access to high society earned him his first commission; painting the private chapel of Count Robert Lichnowski (1822–1879). He hoped this would bring him further work back in Germany, but nothing materialized, despite none other than Ottilie von Goethe being his patroness.

His connections did result in an invitation to take a trip to Sicily in 1854. There, a promising relationship with a young Countess came to nothing when her parents saw his family's modest home. The following year, he went to Venice with Von Goethe, but commissions were still elusive. The major order finally came in 1856. Count Peter Wilhelm Von Hohenthal (1799–1859) commissioned him to decorate two halls in Dölkau Castle with themes from the history of the Hohenzollern family.

In 1860, through an introduction by Von Goethe, he married Antonie Zwez, daughter of a Privy Councilor in Weimar. She died five years later, shortly after the birth of their second son, August, who also died. Following the example of his parents, he became a wanderer, visiting Rome, Naples, Venice, Lyon, Paris, Belgium and Switzerland.

His father died in 1868 and he inherited both of the family houses in Altaussee. He set up a studio in one and concentrated on landscape painting; continuing to receive the occasional commission from people he had met in Italy. Later, he became a writer. Among his works is a five volume set of memoirs. He died in 1902, in Schwabach.

== Sources ==
- Carl von Binzer in Austria-Forum (in German) (at AEIOU)
- Ulrich Schulte-Wülwer, "Carl von Binzer", in: Sehnsucht nach Italien – Schleswig-Holsteinische Künstler in Italien, Heide 2009, pp. 268–272. ISBN 978-3-8042-1284-8
- Hyacinth Holland: "Binzer, Carl von". In: Ulrich Thieme, Felix Becker (Eds.): Allgemeines Lexikon der Bildenden Künstler von der Antike bis zur Gegenwart. Vol. 4: Bida–Brevoort. Wilhelm Engelmann, Leipzig 1910, pp. 42–43 (Online)
