= Landesvater =

German College

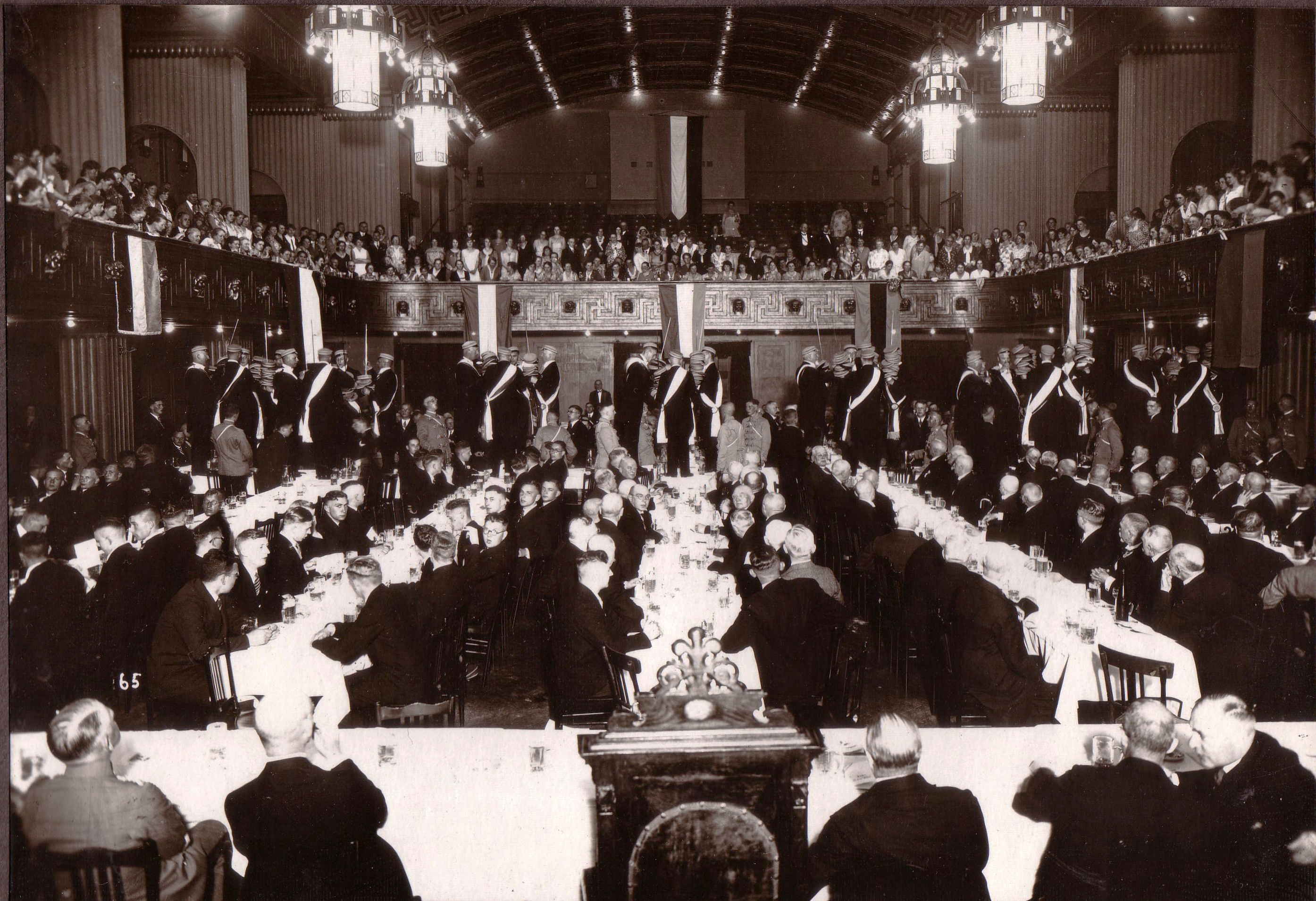
Kommers at Königsberg (1930)

The ceremonial Landesvater is a German college custom developed in the 18th century, where student caps are pierced with the blade of a sword, during the recital of a particular song. The song that accompanies this event is also called 'Landesvater'. The word Landesvater is also used as a name for the prime ministers of the individual German states, or Länder.

== History ==
Heraldic shield of Joseph II

In the 17th and 18th centuries, it was common among students to pierce their hats in order to show their love for a girl. Later, the custom changed insomuch as it symbolised friendship between two students who henceforth said Du (brother) to each other. A further step in the development of this custom transferred the symbolic expression of friendship to their larger community. After 1770, academic orders were founded, following the example of the Freemasons. They used the rite in order to express their loyalty to their respective prince or the emperor. The original version of the 'Landesvater' that is still used today, with modified lyrics, hence praises Emperor Joseph II. The pierced parts of the caps are often embroidered with cloth in the form of an oak leaf.

== Lyrics ==
The ceremony is accompanied by the song Alles schweige, jeder neige / Ernsten Tönen nun sein Ohr, which was written by August Niemann in 1782. Whereas Niemann's version praises Emperor Joseph II, the lyrics of the 'Landesvater' were changed in the 19th century, and have since then praised Germany, instead of a single monarch. The modern version emanates from Friedrich Silcher (1823).

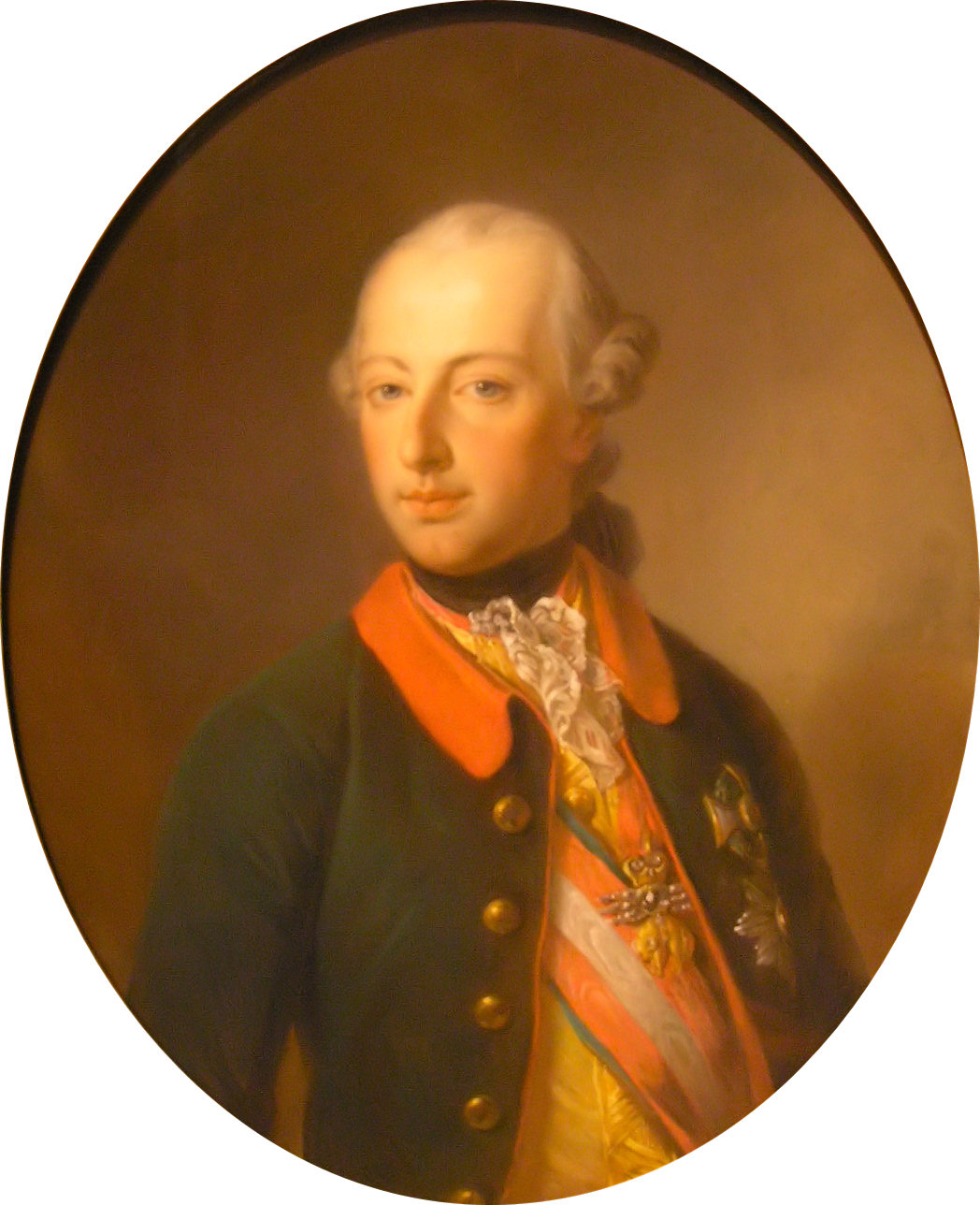
Portrait of Joseph II by Georg Decker

Niemann's original 18th century lyrics (excerpts) were as follows:

| original German | translated English |
|---|---|
| Vorsänger; Alles schweige, Jeder neige Ernsten Tönen nun sein Ohr! Horcht! Ich sing das Lied der Lieder! Horcht mir, meine deutschen Brüder! Hall es wieder, froher Chor! Josephs Söhne, Laut ertöne Unser Vaterlandsgesang! Den Beglücker deutscher Staaten, Den Vollender großer Taten; Preise unser Hochgesang. | Precentor; May everyone be silent, And listen To this serious song! Listen! I chant the song of songs! Listen, my German brothers! And repeat, jolly choir! Joseph's sons, May our paean to the fatherland Resound! Our song of joy may praise Him who makes Germany's states happy, And him whose deeds are great. |
| Chor; Hab und Leben; Ihm zu geben, Sind wir allzumal bereit. Stürben gerne jede Stunde, Achten nicht des Todes Wunde, Wenn das Vaterland gebeut. | Chorus; We are always prepared To give him Our belongings and our lives. We would die at all times And be contemptuous of death's power If the fatherland demands it. |
| (...) | (...) |
| Der Vorsänger, der nächste Sänger und derjenige, der diesem am nächsten sitzt. | The precentor, the one sitting next to him, and the following person. |
| Heil dem Bande, Heil dem Lande, Das mit Joseph uns vereint! Jeder brave Deutsche trachte, Daß ihn einst sein Joseph achte, Sei des Vaterlandes Freund! | Hail to the ribbon, Hail to the land, That unites us with Joseph! Every brave German endeavours to Be esteemed by Joseph, To be the friend of his country! |
| (...) | (...) |
| Joseph lebe! Joseph lebe! Heil uns, die sein Land vereint! Jedem Heil, der deutsch und bieder Ist wie wir, vereinte Brüder, Und des Vaterlandes Freund! | Joseph may live! Joseph may live! Hail to us who are united by his country! Hail to everyone who is German and honest, Like us, united brothers, And who is a friend of the fatherland. |
| Nun eine Pause von einigen Minuten, dann beginnt der zweite Act, den folgendes nach der Melodie: "God save great George the king" zu singende Lied ausfüllt: | A pause of several minutes. Then the second act beginning with the following song with the tune of "God save great George the king": |
| Heil, Kaiser Joseph, Heil! Dir, Deutschlands Vater, Heil! Dem Kaiser Heil! Wem Josephs Lobgesang; Zum deutschen Herzen drang, Stimm' ein beim Becherklang: Heil, Joseph, Heil! | Hail to thee, Emperor Joseph, hail! Hail to thee, Germany's father! Hail to the emperor! He whose heart heard Joseph's paean, May sing along while drinking: Hail to thee, Joseph, hail! |
| (...) | (...) |
| Wir fühlen hohen Mut; Und lassen Gut und Blut; Fürs Vaterland. Für seinen Kaiser fliegt Der deutsche Mann vergnügt In jede Schlacht und siegt Fürs Vaterland. | We feel proud courage And are willing to sacrifice good and blood For the fatherland. Merrily the German eschews No battle for his emperor, And always wins For the fatherland. |
| Bleibt, Deutsche, brav und gut! Du stammst von Hermanns Blut, Edles Geschlecht! Weh, wer für Sklavensold, Für fremdes feiges Gold; Sein deutsches Blut verzollt, Fluch sei dem Knecht. | Germans, remain brave and good! You stem from Hermann's blood, Noble kin. Alack! Who sells his German blood For slavish pay Or foreign gold. May this vassal be cursed. |
| Er fühlt nicht deutschen Mut, War mit Thuiskons Blut; Niemals verwandt. Fürst sei er oder Sklav; Er denkt nicht stolz und brav, Verdienet Schand' und Straf'; Ums Vaterland. | He does not feel German courage And has never been related With Tuisto's kin. He may be a prince or a slave, He does not think proudly and bravely, And only deserves dishonour and punishment For his disrespect to the fatherland. |
| (...) | (...) |

== Literature ==
- Adam Joseph Uhrig: Der akademische Landesvater, ein Denkmal aus alter Ritterzeit. Würzburg 1888.
- Erich Bauer: Der ursprüngliche Text des Landesvaters von stud. August Niemann 1782. Einst und Jetzt, Bd. 22 (1977), P. 235–238.
- Joachim Bauer: "Student und Nation im Spiegel des »Landesvater«-Liedes". In: Dieter Langewiesche, Georg Schmidt (Hg.): Föderative Nation. Deutschlandkonzepte von der Reformation bis zum Ersten Weltkrieg. Munich 2000, P. 136–155.
- Georg Conrad: Der Landesvater. In: Studentenhistorische Beiträge (1993), P. 37–39.
- Wilhelm Fabricius: Die Deutschen Corps. Eine historische Darstellung mit besonderer Berücksichtigung des Mensurwesens. Berlin 1898, 2nd edition. 1926. P. 122ff.
- Wilhelm Rehmann: "Der feierliche Landesvater als Höhepunkt des Kommerses". In: Der Convent 6 (1955), P. 222–227.
- Aribert Schwenke: Zur Geschichte des Landesvaters. Einst und Jetzt, Bd. 35 (1990), P. 67–88.
