= Religion in national symbols =

National symbols which depict a religious element

Religion in national symbols can often be found in national anthems or flags. This has led to controversy in some secular states in regard to the separation of church and state, when the national symbol is officially sanctioned by a government.

== Flags which incorporate symbols of religion ==
=== Dharmic religions ===
Buddhism
Flag	Country	Religious significance
	Bhutan (flag)	The orange half signifies Vajrayana Buddhist spiritual tradition
	Myanmar (flag)	The color saffron stands for Theravada Buddhism.
	Singapore (flag)	The white half symbolizes Chinese Buddhism.
	Sri Lanka (flag)	The four Bodhi tree leaves symbolize four Buddhist metaphysical
	Thailand (flag)	The color white stands for Theravada Buddhism.
Buddhism and/or Hinduism
Flag	Country	Religious significance
	Cambodia (flag)	Angkor Wat, a Hindu-Buddhist temple complex.
	India (flag)	The Ashoka Chakra symbolizes the Dharmachakra, representing the teachings of The Buddha (revered by Buddhists and Hindus) and is rooted in the Hindu-vedic concept of Dharma-based gouvernance..
	Nepal (flag)	Based on the Hindu traditional flags. Also represent Hinduism and Buddhism

=== Christianity ===
Flag	Country	Religious significance
(Andorra)	Andorra (flag)	The coat of arms of Andorra contains a bishop's mitre, representing the Latin Catholic bishop of Urgell.
(Argentina)	Argentina (flag)	The colors light blue and white represent the mantle of the Virgin Mary (Our Lady of Luján)
(Armenia)	Armenia (flag)	The red third emblematizes the maintenance of the Christian faith (particularly Oriental Orthodox and Oriental Catholic denominations).
(Australia)	Australia (flag)	Crosses of Saint George, Saint Andrew and Saint Patrick symbolise Western Christianity (red may also symbolise the sacrifice of the blood of Jesus Christ, which was shed during his crucifixion)
(Burundi)	Burundi (flag)	Saint Andrew's Cross
(Cook Islands)	Cook Islands (flag)	Crosses of Saint George, Saint Andrew and Saint Patrick symbolise Western Christianity (red may also symbolise the sacrifice of the blood of Jesus Christ, which was shed during his crucifixion)
(Denmark)	Denmark (flag)	Nordic Cross Flag
(Dominica)	Dominica (flag)	The cross represents the Trinity
(Dominican Republic)	Dominican Republic (flag)	Saint George's Cross, Gospel of John, the color white stands for salvation
(El Salvador)	El Salvador (flag)	Dios, Unión, Libertad (God, Union, Liberty)
(Fiji)	Fiji (flag)	Crosses of Saint George, Saint Andrew and Saint Patrick symbolise Western Christianity (red may also symbolise the sacrifice of the blood of Jesus Christ, which was shed during his crucifixion) and dove
(Finland)	Finland (flag)	Nordic Cross Flag
(Georgia (country))	Georgia (flag)	Saint George's Cross and four Bolnisi crosses symbolize Georgian Orthodoxy
(Greece)	Greece (flag)	Greek cross symbolizes Greek Orthodoxy
(Hungary)	Hungary (flag)	The red symbolizes the blood of Jesus Christ, and the white symbolizes the salvation, while the green symbolizes Catholic Christianity (particularly the Latin and Eastern Catholic churches).
(Iceland)	Iceland (flag)	Nordic Cross Flag
(Republic of Ireland)	Ireland (flag)	The green signifies the Roman Catholic majority, and the orange signifies the Protestant minority, while the white signifies the peace between Catholics and Protestants.
(Lebanon)	Lebanon (flag)	The cedar of Lebanon is an important biblical historical symbol (Cedars of God).
(Liechtenstein)	Liechtenstein (flag)	Christian cross
(Malta)	Malta (flag)	George Cross
(Moldova)	Moldova (flag)	Orthodox Cross
(Montenegro)	Montenegro (flag)	Three crosses on the coat of arms symbolize Montenegrin Orthodoxy
(Montserrat)	Montserrat (flag)	Crosses of Saint George, Saint Andrew and Saint Patrick symbolise Western Christianity (red may also symbolise the sacrifice of the blood of Jesus Christ, which was shed during his crucifixion). The flag also consists of an Irish figure Erin holding a Latin cross.
(New Zealand)	New Zealand (flag)	Crosses of Saint George, Saint Andrew and Saint Patrick symbolise Western Christianity (red may also symbolise the sacrifice of the blood of Jesus Christ, which was shed during his crucifixion)
(Niue)	Niue (flag)	Crosses of Saint George, Saint Andrew and Saint Patrick symbolise Western Christianity (red may also symbolise the sacrifice of the blood of Jesus Christ, which was shed during his crucifixion)
(Norway)	Norway (flag)	Nordic Cross Flag
(Portugal)	Portugal (flag)	Compound cross of five quinas, each one charged with five saltire-arranged bezants, representing both the Five Holy Wounds and also Jesus Christ and the Four Evangelists
(San Marino)	San Marino (flag)	Christian cross
(Serbia)	Serbia (flag)	Serbian cross symbolizes Serbian Orthodoxy
(Slovakia)	Slovakia (flag)	Patriarchal cross
(Spain)	Spain (flag)	Latin cross
(Sweden)	Sweden (flag)	Nordic Cross Flag
(Switzerland)	Switzerland (flag)	Greek cross
(Tonga)	Tonga (flag)	Greek cross (red may also symbolise the sacrifice of the blood of Jesus Christ, which was shed during his crucifixion)
(Tuvalu)	Tuvalu (flag)	Crosses of Saint George, Saint Andrew and Saint Patrick symbolise Western Christianity (red may also symbolise the sacrifice of the blood of Jesus Christ, which was shed during his crucifixion)
(United Kingdom)	United Kingdom (flag)	Crosses of Saint George, Saint Andrew and Saint Patrick symbolise Western Christianity (red may also symbolise the sacrifice of the blood of Jesus Christ, which was shed during his crucifixion)
(Vatican City)	Vatican City (flag)	The flag consists of two vertical bands, one of gold (hoist side) and one of white with the crossed keys of Saint Peter and the Papal Tiara centered in the white band

=== Islam ===
Flag	Country	Religious significance
(Afghanistan)	Afghanistan (flag)	Shahada
(Algeria)	Algeria (flag)	Star and crescent, green half symbolizes Islam
(Azerbaijan)	Azerbaijan (flag)	Green stands for Islam, the crescent moon is also an Islamic symbol
(Bahrain)	Bahrain (flag)	Five triangles represent the Five Pillars of Islam
(Brunei)	Brunei (flag)	Crescent moon
(Comoros)	Comoros (flag)	Star and crescent and green color are traditional symbols of Islam
(Iran)	Iran (flag)	The five parts of the emblem represent the Five Pillars of Islam, this shape of the emblem is a stylized form of the Arabic word "Allah" (ٱللَّٰهُ); text along the red and green bands reads "Allahu Akbar" ("God is Great")
(Iraq)	Iraq (flag)	The phrase "Allahu Akbar" ("God is Great")
(Jordan)	Jordan (flag)	The seven-pointed star represents the seven verses of the Quran's first sura
(Libya)	Libya (flag)	Star and crescent represent Islam
(Malaysia)	Malaysia (flag)	Crescent moon
(Maldives)	Maldives (flag)	White crescent moon symbolizes Islam
(Mauritania)	Mauritania (flag)	Star and crescent and green color symbolize Islam
(Morocco)	Morocco (flag)	The green represents Islam. The pentagram's five points symbolize the five Pillars of Islam.
(Niger)	Niger (flag)	The green symbolizes Islam.
(Pakistan)	Pakistan (flag)	Star and crescent symbolize Islam and the dark green field symbolizes the Muslim majority of Pakistan.
(Saudi Arabia)	Saudi Arabia (flag)	Shahada (Muslim creed) on green background, a color represents Islam
(Senegal)	Senegal (flag)	The green stripe and star represent Islam.
(Somaliland)	Somaliland (flag)	Shahada (green may also represent Islam)
(Sudan)	Sudan (flag)	Green represents Islam.
(Tunisia)	Tunisia (flag)	Star and crescent symbolize Islam
(Turkey)	Turkey (flag)	Star and crescent
(Turkmenistan)	Turkmenistan (flag)	Crescent moon (green may also represent Islam)
(Uzbekistan)	Uzbekistan (flag)	Crescent moon (green may also represent Islam), the word "Allah" ("God") from 12 stars
(Yemen)	Yemen (flag)	The red symbolizes the Hashemites, and the white symbolizes the Umayyads, while the black symbolizes the Abbasids

=== Judaism ===
Flag	Country	Religious significance
(Israel)	Israel (flag)	The flag's basic design is based on a Jewish prayer shawl, the Star of David is a symbol of Judaism

=== Traditional ===
Flag	Country	Religious significance
(Argentina)	Argentina (flag)	Sun of May's features are that of the Incan god Inti
(Japan)	Japan (flag)	Red circle represents the sun goddess Amaterasu
(South Korea)	South Korea (flag)	Taegeuk symbol is associated with Taoism and traditional Korean Shamanism; I Ching trigrams.
(Mexico)	Mexico (flag)	Coat of arms of Mexico is symbolic of the Aztec legend of Tenochtitlan, modern-day Mexico City
(Mongolia)	Mongolia (flag)	Yin and Yang symbol is associated with Taoism and traditional Mongolian shamanism. The Sun, Moon and blue colour represent the eternal blue sky
(Taiwan)	Taiwan (flag)	The twelve rays of the white sun symbolize the twelve months and the twelve traditional shichen (時辰; shíchén), periods of one-twelfth of a day used in Traditional Chinese timekeeping and astrology
(Tajikistan)	Tajikistan (flag)	The seven stars representing number seven in Tajik traditional legends, representing perfection and happiness while alluding to a traditional belief that the heavens feature seven mountains and seven orchard gardens with a star shining above each mountain.
(Uruguay)	Uruguay (flag)	Sun of May's features are that of the Incan god Inti

== National anthems which incorporate religion ==
National anthems which incorporate religion
Country	National anthem	Religion(s) mentioned
Afghanistan	"Dā də bātorāno kor" (English: "This is the Home of the Brave")	Islam
Albania	"Himni i Flamurit" (English: "Hymn to the Flag")	Islam and Christianity
Antigua and Barbuda	"Fair Antigua, We Salute Thee"	Christianity
Austria	"Land der Berge, Land am Strome" (English: "Land of the Mountains, Land on the River")	Christianity
Azerbaijan	"Azərbaycan marşı" (English: "March of Azerbaijan")	Islam
Bahamas	"March On, Bahamaland"	Christianity
Bahrain	"Bahrainona" (English: "Our Bahrain")	Islam
Barbados	"In Plenty and In Time of Need"	Christianity
Belarus	"My Belarusy" (English: "We Belarusians")	Christianity
Belize	"Land of the Free"	Christianity
Bhutan	"Druk tsendhen" (English: "The Thunder Dragon Kingdom")	Buddhism
Bolivia	"Himno Nacional de Bolivia" (English: "National Anthem of Bolivia")	Christianity
Botswana	"Fatshe leno la Rona" (English: "Blessed Be This Noble Land")	Christianity
Brunei	"Allah Peliharakan Sultan" (English: "God Bless the Sultan")	Islam
Burundi	"Burundi Bwacu" (English: "Our Burundi")	Christianity
Cambodia	"Nokoreach" (English: "Royal Kingdom")	Buddhism
Cameroon	"Chant de Ralliement" (French: "The Rallying Song")	Christianity
Canada	"Ô Canada" (English: "O Canada")	Christianity
Chad	"La Tchadienne" (English: "Song of the Chadian")	Islam
Chile	"Himno Nacional de Chile" (English: "National Anthem of Chile")	Christianity
Colombia	"Himno Nacional de la República de Colombia" (English: "National Anthem of the Republic of Colombia")	Christianity
Comoros	"Udzima wa ya Masiwa" (English: "The Union of the Great Islands")	Islam
Czech Republic	"Kde Domov Můj?" (English: "Where is my Home?")	Christianity
Denmark	"Der er et Yndigt Land" (English: "There is a Lovely Country")	Traditional
Djibouti	"La Djiboutienne" (English: "The Djiboutian Song")	Islam
Dominica	"Isle of Beauty, Isle of Splendour"	Christianity
DR Congo	"Debout Congolais" (English: "Arise Congolese")	Christianity
Ecuador	"Salve, Oh Patria" (English: "We Salute You, Our Homeland")	Christianity
El Salvador	"Himno Nacional de El Salvador" (English: "National Anthem of El Salvador")	Christianity
Estonia	"Mu isamaa, mu õnn ja rõõm" (English: "My Fatherland, My Happiness and Joy")	Christianity
Eswatini	"Nkulunkulu Mnikati wetibusiso temaSwati" (English: "O Lord is our God, Swaziland")	Christianity
Fiji	"God Bless Fiji"	Christianity and Hinduism
France	"La Marseillaise" (English: "The Song from Marseille")	Christianity
Gambia	"For The Gambia Our Homeland"	Islam
Ghana	"God Bless Our Homeland Ghana"	Christianity
Georgia	"Tavisupleba" (English: "Freedom")	Christianity
Grenada	"Hail Grenada"	Christianity
Guatemala	"Himno Nacional de Guatemala" (English: "National Anthem of Guatemala")	Christianity
Guyana	"Dear Land of Guyana, of Rivers and Plains"	Christianity, Islam, and Hinduism
Haiti	"La Dessalinienne" (English: "The Dessalines Song") (Note: Specifically the fourth verse.)	Christianity
Honduras	"Himno Nacional de Honduras" (English: "National Anthem of Honduras")	Christianity
Hungary	"Himnusz" (English: "Anthem")	Christianity
Iceland	"Lofsöngur" (English: "Hymn")	Christianity and traditional
India	"Jana Gana Mana" (English: "The Minds of All People")	Hinduism, Islam, Christianity, Sikhism, Buddhism, Jainism, Baháʼí, Zoroastrianism and traditional
Indonesia	"Indonesia Raya" (English: "Great Indonesia")	Christianity, Islam, Hinduism, Taoism, Confucianism and Buddhism
Iran	"Sorud-e Melli-e Iran" (English: "National Anthem of Iran")	Islam
Israel	"Hatikvah" (English: "The Hope")	Judaism
Italy	"Il Canto degli Italiani" (English: "The Song of the Italians")	Christianity
Ivory Coast	"L'Abidjanaise" (English: "Song of Abidjan")	Christianity and Islam
Jamaica	"Jamaica, Land We Love"	Christianity
Japan	"Kimigayo" (English: "His Majesty's Reign")	Agnosticism, Atheism, Buddhism and Shintoism
Jordan	"As-Salam al-Malaki al-Urduni" (English: "Peace to the King of Jordan")	Islam
Kenya	"Ee Mungu Nguvu Yetu" (English: "Oh God of All Creation")	Christianity
Kiribati	"Teirake Kaini Kiribati" (English: "Stand Up, Kiribati")	Christianity
North Korea	"Aegukka" (English: "Patriotic Song")	Agnosticism and Atheism
South Korea	"Aegukga" (English: "Patriotic Song")	Christianity, Confucianism and Buddhism
Kosovo	"Himni i Republikës së Kosovës" (English: "Anthem of the Republic of Kosovo")	Islam and Christianity
Kuwait	"Al-Nasheed Al-Watani" (English: "National Anthem")	Islam
Latvia	"Dievs, svētī Latviju!" (English: "God, Bless Latvia!")	Christianity
Lebanon	"an-Našīd al-Waṭanī al-Lubnānī" (English: "Lebanese National Anthem")	Christianity and Islam
Lesotho	"Lesotho Fatse La Bontata Rona" (English: "Lesotho, Land of our Fathers")	Christianity
Liberia	"All Hail, Liberia, Hail!"	Christianity
Libya	"Libya, Libya, Libya"	Islam
Liechtenstein	"Oben am jungen Rhein" (English: "Up above the young Rhine")	Christianity
Luxembourg	"Ons Hemecht" (English: "Our Homeland")	Christianity
Madagascar	"Ry Tanindrazanay malala ô!" (English: "Oh, Our Beloved Father Land")	Christianity and traditional
Malawi	"Mulungu dalitsa Malaŵi" (English: "O God bless our land of Malawi")	Christianity
Maldives	"Gaumii Salaam" (English: "National Salute")	Islam
Mali	"Le Mali" (English: "Mali")	Islam
Malta	"L-Innu Malti" (English: "The Maltese Hymn")	Christianity
Marshall Islands	"Forever Marshall Islands"	Christianity
Mauritania	"Nshyd Wtny Mwrytany" (English: "National Anthem of Mauritania")	Islam
Mauritius	"Motherland"	Christianity and Hinduism
Mexico	"Himno Nacional Mexicano" (English: "Mexican National Anthem")	Christianity and traditional
Federated States of Micronesia	"Patriots of Micronesia"	Christianity
Monaco	"Hymne Monégasque" (English: "Monégasque Anthem")	Christianity
Morocco	"An-Našīd aš-Šarīf" (English: "Cherifian Anthem")	Islam
Nauru	"Nauru Bwiema" (English: "Nauru, our Homeland")	Christianity
Nepal	"Sayaun Thunga Phulka" (English: "We are Hundreds of Flowers")	Buddhism and Hinduism
Netherlands	"Wilhelmus" (English: "William") (Note: Most of the verses contain a link to religion and the sixth verse is entirely devoted to God.)	Christianity
New Zealand	"God Defend New Zealand and God Save the Queen"	Christianity
Nigeria	"Nigeria, We Hail Thee"	Christianity and Islam
Norway	"Ja, vi Elsker dette Landet" (English: "Yes, we Love this Country")	Christianity
Oman	"As-Salam as-Sultani" (English: "Song of the Sultanic Salute")	Islam
Pakistan	"Qaumī Tarāna" (English: "National Anthem")	Islam
Palau	"Belau Rekid" (English: "Our Palau")	Christianity
Panama	"Himno Istmeño" (English: "Hymn of the Isthmus")	Christianity
Papua New Guinea	"O Arise, All You Sons"	Christianity
Paraguay	"Paraguayos, República o Muerte" (English: "Paraguayans, Republic or Death")	Christianity
Peru	"Himno Nacional del Perú" (English: "National Anthem of Peru")	Christianity
Qatar	"As Salam al Amiri" (English: "Peace to the Amir")	Islam
Rwanda	"Rwanda Nziza" (English: "Beautiful Rwanda")	Christianity
Romania	"Deșteaptă-te, Române!" (English: "Awaken, Romanian!")	Christianity
Russia	"Gosudarstvenny Gimn Rossiyskoy Federatsi" (English: "State Anthem of the Russian Federation")	Christianity
Saint Kitts and Nevis	"O Land of Beauty!"	Christianity
Saint Lucia	"Sons and Daughters of Saint Lucia"	Christianity
Saint Vincent and the Grenadines	"Saint Vincent Land so Beautiful	Christianity
Samoa	"O Le Fu'a o Le Sa'olotoga o Samoa" (English: "The Banner of Freedom")	Christianity
Saudi Arabia	"Aash Al Maleek" (English: "Long Live the King")	Islam
Senegal	"Pincez tous vos koras, frappez les balafons" (English: "Everyone strum your koras, strike the balafons")	Islam
Serbia	"Bože pravde" (English: "God of Justice")	Christianity
Seychelles	"Koste Seselwa" (English: "Join together all Seychellois")	Christianity
Sierra Leone	"High We Exalt Thee, Realm of the Free"	Christianity and Islam
Slovakia	"Nad Tatrou sa Blýska" (English: "Lightning over the Tatras")	Christianity
Slovenia	"Zdravljica" (English: "A Toast")	Christianity
Solomon Islands	"God Save Our Solomon Islands"	Christianity
Somalia	"Qolobaa Calankeed" (English: "Praise the Homeland")	Islam
South Africa	"National Anthem of South Africa"	Christianity
South Sudan	"South Sudan Oyee!"	Christianity
Sri Lanka	"Sri Lanka Matha" (English: "Mother Sri Lanka")	Buddhism
Sudan	"Nahnu Jund Allah Jund Al-watan" (English: "We are the Soldiers of God and of our Homeland")	Islam
Suriname	"God zij met ons Suriname" (English: "God be with our Suriname")	Christianity
Sweden	"Du gamla, Du fria" (English: "Thou ancient, Thou free") (Note: No reference to Christianity in the original text, only in the unofficial and seldom sung extra verses suggested in 1910. References to Christianity do however exist in the royal anthem "Kungssången".)	Christianity
Switzerland	"Schweizerpsalm/Cantique Suisse/Salmo Svizzero/Psalm Svizzer" (English: "Swiss Psalm")	Christianity
Syria	"Humat ad-Diyar" (English: "Guardians of the Homeland") (Note: Specifically the third and fourth verses.)	Islam
Taiwan	"Three Principles of the People" (English: "National Anthem of Taiwan")	Confucianism
Tanzania	"Mungu ibariki Afrika" (English: "God Bless Africa")	Christianity and Islam
Togo	"Salut à Toi, Pays de nos Aïeux" (English: "Hail to Thee, Land of our Forefathers")	Christianity
Tonga	"Ko e fasi ʻo e tuʻi ʻo e ʻOtu Tonga" (English: "The Song of the King of the Tongan Islands")	Christianity
Trinidad and Tobago	"Forged from the Love of Liberty"	Christianity and Hinduism
Tunisia	"Humat al-Hima" (English: "Defenders of the Homeland")	Islam
Turkey	"İstiklâl Marşı" (English: "Independence March")	Islam
Tuvalu	"Tuvalu mo te Atua" (English: "Tuvalu for the Almighty")	Christianity
United Arab Emirates	"Ishy Bilady" (English: "Long Live my Nation")	Islam
Uganda	"Oh Uganda, Land of Beauty"	Christianity
Uruguay	"Himno Nacional de Uruguay" (English: "National Anthem of Uruguay")	Christianity
United Kingdom	"God Save the King"	Christianity
United States	"The Star-Spangled Banner"	Christianity
Uzbekistan	"O‘zbekiston Respublikasining Davlat Madhiyasi" (English: "National Anthem of Uzbekistan")	Islam
Vanuatu	"Yumi, Yumi, Yumi" (English: "We, We, We")	Christianity
Vatican City	"Inno e Marcia Pontificale" (English: "Hymn and Pontifical March")	Christianity
Venezuela	"Gloria al Bravo Pueblo" (English: "Glory to the Brave People")	Christianity
Yemen	"Nashīd al-Yaman al-Watani" (English: "National Anthem of Yemen")	Islam
Zambia	"Stand and Sing of Zambia, Proud and Free"	Christianity
Zimbabwe	"National Anthem of Zimbabwe"	Christianity

=== Former national anthems ===
Former national anthems which incorporated religion
Country	National anthem	Religion(s) mentioned
Australia, until 1984	"God Save the Queen"	Christianity
Austria-Hungary	"Gott erhalte Franz den Kaiser" (English: "God Save Emperor Francis")	Christianity
Bosnia and Herzegovina, until 1998	"Jedna si jedina" (English: "You Are the One and Only")	Christianity and Islam
Canada, until 1967	"God Save the Queen"	Christianity
China	"Gong Jin'ou" (English: "Cup of Solid Gold")	Confucianism
Egypt	"Es Salaam el Gamhoury el Masry" (English: "Egyptian Republican Anthem")	Christianity and Islam
Ethiopia	"Ityopp'ya Hoy" (English: "Ethiopia, Be happy")	Christianity
Hawaii	"He Mele Lahui Hawaii" (English: "Song of the Hawaiian Nation")	Christianity
Iran	"Sorude Melli" (English: "National Anthem")	Christianity, Islam and Zoroastrianism
Iraq, until 2003	"Ardh ul-Furatayn" (English: "Land of the Euphrates")	Islam
Korea	"Daehan Jeguk Aegukga" (English: "Patriotic Hymn of the Great Korean Empire")	Christianity, Confucianism and Buddhism
Laos	"Pheng Xat Lao" (English: "Hymn of the Lao People")	Buddhism
Libya	"Allahu Akbar" (English: "God is Greatest")	Islam
Manchukuo	"Mǎnzhōuguó jiàn guógē" (English: "Manchukuo Independence Song")	Buddhism and Shinto
Montenegro	"Ubavoj nam Crnoj Gori" (English: "To Our Beautiful Montenegro")	Christianity
Namibia, until 1991	"Nkosi Sikelel' iAfrika" (English: "Lord Bless Africa")	Christianity
Netherlands Antilles	Untitled	Christianity
Netherlands, until 1932	"Wien Neêrlands Bloed" (English: "Those in whom Dutch blood")	Christianity
Newfoundland	"Ode to Newfoundland"	Christianity
Nigeria, until 2024	"Arise, O Compatriots"	Christianity and Islam
Orange Free State	"Volkslied van de Oranje Vrijstaat" (English: "National Anthem of the Orange Free State")	Christianity
Portugal	"Hino da Carta" (English: "Hymn to the Charter")	Christianity
Rhodesia	"Rise O Voices of Rhodesia"	Christianity
Romania	"Trăiască Regele" (English: "Long Live the King")	Christianity
Russia	"God Save The Tsar!"	Christianity
Slovakia	"Hej, Slováci" (English: "Hey, Slovaks")	Christianity
South Africa	"Die Stem van Suid-Afrika" (English: "The Call of South Africa")	Christianity
South Africa, until 1957	"God bewaar ons Koningin"	Christianity
South Africa, until 1997	"Nkosi Sikelel' iAfrika" (English: "Lord Bless Africa")	Christianity
Switzerland, until 1961	"Rufst du, mein Vaterland" (English: "When you call, my Fatherland") (Note: Specifically the German version.)	Christianity
Tibet	"Gyallu"	Buddhism
Transvaal	"Volkslied van Transvaal" (English: "National Anthem of the Transvaal") (Note: Specifically the third verse.)	Christianity
Two Sicilies	"Inno al Re" (English: "Hymn to the King")	Christianity
Upper Volta	"Hymne National Voltaïque" (English: "Voltan National Anthem")	Christianity and Islam
Yugoslavia	"Himna Kraljevine Jugoslavije" (English: "Hymn of the Kingdom of Yugoslavia)	Christianity
Zambia, until 1973	"Nkosi Sikelel' iAfrika" (English: "Lord Bless Africa")	Christianity
Zimbabwe, until 1994	"Ishe Komborera Africa" (English: "God Bless Africa")	Christianity

== Coat of arms which symbolize religion ==
=== Dharmic religions ===
Buddhism
Coat of arms	Country	Religious characteristics
	Bhutan (emblem)	Druk, Lotus, Vajra
	Cambodia (coat of arms)	Om
	Laos (emblem)	Pha That Luang
	Mongolia (emblem)	Dharmachakra, Ratnatraya, Wind Horse
	Myanmar (state seal)	Chinthe
	Sri Lanka (emblem)	Dharmachakra, Lotus
Buddhism and/or Hinduism
Coat of arms	Country	Religious characteristics
	India (emblem)	The Ashoka Stambha symbolises the teachings of The Buddha (revered by Buddhists and Hindus) and is rooted in the Hindu-Vedic concept of Stambha and Dharma-based gouvernance. Satyameva Jayate
	Indonesia (coat of arms)	Garuda
	Nepal (emblem)	Janani Janmabhumishcha Swargadapi Gariyasi
	Thailand (emblem)	Garuda

=== Christianity ===
Coat of arms	Country	Religious characteristics
	Andorra (coat of arms)	Includes a bishop's mitre, representing the Latin Catholic bishop of Urgell.
	Argentina (coat of arms)	The colors light blue and white represent the mantle of the Virgin Mary (Our Lady of Luján)
	Armenia (coat of arms)	Mount Ararat with Noah's Ark sitting atop it (the two crosses may also represent Oriental Orthodoxy).
	Australia (coat of arms)	St George's Cross, Maltese cross
	Belgium (coat of arms)	A globus cruciger on top of the coat of arms as a Christian symbol of authority
	Benin (coat of arms)	Maltese cross
	Bulgaria (coat of arms)	The crosses on the four crowns symbolize Bulgarian Orthodoxy
	Canada (coat of arms)	Cross, A Mari Usque Ad Mare ('From Sea to Sea')
	Central African Republic (coat of arms)	Maltese cross
	Chad (coat of arms)	Maltese cross
	Cyprus (coat of arms)	Dove
	Denmark (coat of arms)	A globus cruciger on top of the coat of arms as a Christian symbol of authority; royal arms also has cross
	Dominica (coat of arms)	Cross, Apres Bondie C'est La Ter ('After God the Earth')
	Dominican Republic (coat of arms)	Latin cross, Gospel of John, Dios, Patria, Libertad ('God, Fatherland, Liberty')
	El Salvador (coat of arms)	Dios, Unión, Libertad (God, Union, Liberty)
	Fiji (coat of arms)	Cross, Rerevaka na kalou ka doka na Tui ('Fear God and honour the Queen'), dove
	Georgia (coat of arms)	St. George slaying the dragon, Bolnisi cross, globus cruciger
	Grenada (coat of arms)	Cross, 'Ever Conscious of God we Aspire, Build and Advance as One People'
	Greece (coat of arms)	Greek cross symbolizes Greek Orthodoxy
	Hungary (coat of arms)	Patriarchal cross; cross and six Christian icons on the distinctive Crown of Saint Stephen
	Iceland (coat of arms)	Nordic cross
	Jamaica (coat of arms)	Saint George's Cross
	Liechtenstein (coat of arms)	A globus cruciger on top of the coat of arms as a Christian symbol of authority
	Lithuania (coat of arms)	Patriarchal cross
	Luxembourg (coat of arms)	A globus cruciger on top of the coat of arms as a Christian symbol of authority
	Malta (coat of arms)	George Cross
	Moldova (coat of arms)	Cross symbolizes Moldovan Orthodoxy
	Monaco (coat of arms)	Cross, Deo Juvante ('With God's Help')
	Montenegro (coat of arms)	Three crosses on the coat of arms symbolize Montenegrin Orthodoxy
	Nauru (coat of arms)	'God's Will First'
	Netherlands (coat of arms)	A globus cruciger on top of the coat of arms as a Christian symbol of authority
	New Zealand (coat of arms)	A globus cruciger on top of the coat of arms as a Christian symbol of authority
	Nigeria (coat of arms)	'Unity and Faith, Peace and Progress'
	Norway (coat of arms)	A globus cruciger on top of the coat of arms as a Christian symbol of authority. The Danish axe is a battle weapon from Middle Ages that represents St. Olaf, and thus the conversion of Norway to Christianity.
	Portugal (coat of arms)	Compound cross of five quinas, each one charged with five saltire-arranged bezants
	Romania (coat of arms)	Three crosses on the coat of arms symbolize Romanian Orthodoxy
	Russia (coat of arms)	St. George slaying the Dragon (the four crosses may also represent Russian Orthodoxy)
	Samoa (coat of arms)	Faavae i Le Atua Samoa ('Samoa is founded on God'), cross
	San Marino (coat of arms)	A globus cruciger on top of the coat of arms as a Christian symbol of authority
	Serbia (coat of arms)	Serbian cross and other two crosses symbolize Serbian Orthodoxy
	Slovakia (coat of arms)	Patriarchal cross
	Spain (coat of arms)	A globus cruciger on top of the coat of arms as a Christian symbol of authority
	Sweden (coat of arms)	Protestant cross, a globus cruciger on top of the coat of arms as a Christian symbol of authority
	Switzerland (coat of arms)	Greek cross
	Tonga (coat of arms)	Cross, dove, Ko e ʻOtua mo Tonga ko hoku Tofiʻa ('God and Tonga are my inheritance')
	Tuvalu (coat of arms)	Tuvalu Mo Te Atua ('Tuvalu for the Almighty')
	Uganda (coat of arms)	For God and My Country
	United Kingdom (coat of arms)	globus crucigers, 'Dieu et mon droit' ('God and my right'), and on Scottish version, 'In My Defens God Me Defend' (shortened to 'In Defens')
	United States (seal reverse)	Eye of Providence
	Vatican City (coat of arms)	The crossed keys of St. Peter and the Papal Tiara
	Vanuatu (coat of arms)	'Long God yumi stanap' ('In God we stand')

==== Former ====
Coat of arms	Country	Religious characteristics
	Austria-Hungary (coat of arms)	Globus crucigers, patriarchal cross
	Belarus (coat of arms)	Pahonia with a double cross
	Ethiopian Empire (coat of arms)	Cross, globus cruciger, Lion of Judah, St. Michael, Gabriel, ኢትዮጵያ ታበፅዕ እደዊሃ ሃበ እግዚአብሐር ('Ethiopia Stretches Her Hands unto God'), ማዓ አንበሳ ዘአማነባደ ይሁዳ ('Conquering Lion of the Tribe of Judah')
	Georgia (coat of arms)	St. George
	German Empire (coat of arms)	A globus cruciger on top of the coat of arms as a Christian symbol of authority
	Kingdom of Italy (coat of arms)	Cross, globus cruciger
	Russian Empire (coat of arms)	Cross, St. George, St. Michael, Gabriel, 'Съ нами Богъ!' ('God is with us!')
	Kingdom of Yugoslavia (coat of arms)	Globus cruciger, Serbian cross

=== Islam ===
Coat of arms	Country	Religious characteristics
Emblem of Afghanistan	Afghanistan (coat of arms)	Shahadah, mosque, mehrab, Prayer rug
	Algeria (coat of arms)	Star and crescent
	Azerbaijan (coat of arms)	Calligraphic representation of the name Allah in the form of an eternal flame, green
	Bahrain (coat of arms)	Five points represent the five pillars of Islam
	Brunei (coat of arms)	Crescent moon, الدائمون المحسنون بالهدى (Always in service with God's guidance)
	Comoros (Seal)	Star and crescent
	Guinea (coat of arms)	Dove, green represents Islam
	Iran (coat of arms)	Arabic word "Allah" (ٱللَّٰهُ)
	Iraq (coat of arms)	الله أكبر (God is Great)
	Jordan (coat of arms)	Its colours of the eagle signifies the banner of Muhammad, the globe signifies the emergence of Islamic civilisation, الراجي من الله التوفيق والعون (Who seeks support and guidance from God)
	Libya (coat of arms)	Star and crescent
	Malaysia (coat of arms)	Crescent moon
	Maldives (Emblem)	Star and crescent
	Mali (coat of arms)	Great Mosque of Djenné, Un Peuple, Un But, Une Foi (One People, One Goal, One Faith)
	Mauritania (seal)	Star and crescent, green
	Morocco (coat of arms)	إن تنصروا الله ينصركم (If you glorify God, he will glorify you)
	Pakistan (state emblem)	ایمان ، اتحاد ، نظم (Faith, Unity, Discipline), Star and crescent, green
	Senegal (coat of arms)	Un Peuple, Un But, Une Foi (One People, One Goal, One Faith)
	Tunisia (coat of arms)	Star and crescent
	Turkmenistan (emblem)	Rub el Hizb, stars and crescent
	Uzbekistan (emblem)	Rub el Hizb, star and crescent

==== Former ====
Coat of arms	Country	Religious characteristics
	Kingdom of Egypt (coat of arms)	stars and crescent
	Ottoman Empire (coat of arms)	Quran, star and crescent, المستند بالتوفيقات الربانية ملك الدولة العثمانية (The Ottoman State relies on the guidance and assistance of the Almighty)

=== Judaism ===
Coat of arms	Country	Religious characteristics
	Israel (coat of arms)	Menorah, blue

=== Traditional ===
Coat of arms	Country	Religious characteristics
	Argentina (coat of arms)	Sun of May
	South Korea (emblem)	Yin and yang
	Mexico (coat of arms)	Symbolizies the Aztec legend of Tenochtitlan, modern-day Mexico City
	Uruguay (coat of arms)	Sun of May

==== Former ====
Coat of arms	Country	Religious characteristics
	Imperial State of Iran (coat of arms)	Lion and Sun, Faravahar, Simurgh
	Kingdom of Iraq (coat of arms)	Lion of Babylon

== See also ==
- Religious symbolism
- French law on secularity and conspicuous religious symbols in schools
- Religious symbolism in the United States military
- United States Department of Veterans Affairs emblems for headstones and markers
