= List of countries that have the same national anthem =

Some countries share the same national anthem music, or the exact anthem entirely.

== Countries that share the same melody ==
The following is a list of countries that share the same melody, but not the same words.

Country	National anthem	Adopted	Sharing since
Chile	National anthem of Chile	1847	1851
Bolivia	Bolivianos, el Hado Propicio	1851	1851
United Kingdom	God Save the King	1745	1920
Liechtenstein	Oben am jungen Rhein	1920	1920
Finland	Maamme (Note: Swedish: Vårt land)	1917	1990
Estonia	Mu isamaa, mu õnn ja rõõm	1920 (1990)	1990
South Africa	National anthem of South Africa	1997	1997
Zambia	Stand and Sing of Zambia, Proud and Free	1973	1997
Tanzania	Mungu ibariki Afrika	1961	1997

== Countries that have the exact same national anthem ==
The following is a list of countries that have the same national anthem, word for word.

Country	National anthem	Adopted	Same anthem since
Greece	Hymn to Liberty (Note: Greek: Ὕμνος εἰς τὴν Ἐλευθερίαν)	1865	1966
Cyprus	Hymn to Liberty	1966	1966
United Kingdom	God Save the King	1745	1947
New Zealand (Note: This includes the dependent territories of New Zealand.)	God Save the King	1947	1947

== Countries that have the exact same royal anthem ==
The following is a list of countries that have the same royal anthem, word for word.

Country (Note: This includes all dependent territories of other countries.)	Royal anthem	Adopted	Same anthem since
Antigua and Barbuda	God Save the King	1981	1984
Australia	God Save the King	1984	1984
Bahamas	God Save the King	1973	1984
Belize	God Save the King	1981	1984
Canada	God Save the King	1980	1984
Grenada	God Save the King	1974	1984
Jamaica	God Save the King	1962	1984
New Zealand	God Save the King	1947	1984
Papua New Guinea	God Save the King	1975	1984
Saint Kitts and Nevis	God Save the King	1983	1984
Saint Lucia	God Save the King	1979	1984
Saint Vincent and the Grenadines	God Save the King	1979	1984
Solomon Islands	God Save the King	1978	1984
Tuvalu	God Save the King	1978	1984
United Kingdom	God Save the King	1745	1984

== Countries that used to share the same melody ==
The following is a list of countries that used to share the same melody (not the same words), but were replaced by others later.

Country	Former national anthem	Adopted	Current national anthem	Date replaced	Note
German Empire	Heil dir im Siegerkranz	1871	Deutschlandlied	1918 (Note: only de facto, Deutschlandlied became the de jure national anthem of Germany in 1922)	The same current anthem of the United Kingdom and Liechtenstein and the royal anthem of Norway.
Kingdom of Hawaii	E Ola Ke Aliʻi Ke Akua	1860	He Mele Lāhui Hawaiʻi	1866	The same current anthem of the United Kingdom and Liechtenstein and the royal anthem of Norway.
Kingdom of Hanover	Heil dir, Hannover	1814	none (country annexed to Prussia)	1866	The same current anthem of the United Kingdom and Liechtenstein and the royal anthem of Norway.
Rattanakosin Kingdom	Chom Rat Chong Charoen	1852	Bulan Loi Luean	1871	The same current anthem of the United Kingdom and Liechtenstein and the royal anthem of Norway.
Russian Empire	The Prayer of Russians	1816	God Save the Tsar	1833	The same current anthem of the United Kingdom and Liechtenstein and the royal anthem of Norway.
Kingdom of Saxony	Gott segne Sachsenland	1806	Sachsenlied	1918	The same current anthem of the United Kingdom and Liechtenstein and the royal anthem of Norway.
Switzerland	Rufst du, mein Vaterland	1840s	Swiss Psalm	1961	The same current anthem of the United Kingdom and Liechtenstein and the royal anthem of Norway.
Weimar Republic and Germany	Deutschlandlied	1922 / 1952	current anthem		Still used by Germany.
Austrian Empire and Austria-Hungary	Gott erhalte Franz den Kaiser	1797	none (country collapsed)	1918	Still used by Germany.
Austria	Sei gesegnet ohne Ende	1929	Land der Berge, Land am Strome	1946	Still used by Germany.
Namibia	Nkosi Sikelel' iAfrika	1990	Namibia, Land of the Brave	1991	The same current anthem of Zambia, South Africa and Tanzania.
Zimbabwe	Ishe Komborera Africa	1980	Simudzai Mureza wedu WeZimbabwe	1994	The same current anthem of Zambia, South Africa and Tanzania.
Poland	Poland Is Not Yet Lost	1927	current anthem		Still used by Poland.
Yugoslavia	Hej, Slaveni	1945	none (country collapsed)	1991	Still used by Poland.

== Countries that have used the same melody, but did not share it ==
The following is a list of countries that have used the same melody for their national anthem, though not concurrently.

Country	Former national anthem	Adopted	Current national anthem	Date replaced	Note
South Korea	Aegukga	1919	Aegukga	1948	Both national anthems used to be sung to the tune of Auld Lang Syne.
Maldives	Qaumee Salaam	1948	Qaumee Salaam	1972	Both national anthems used to be sung to the tune of Auld Lang Syne.
Yugoslavia	Hej, Slaveni	1945	Hej, Slaveni	1992	The same current anthem of Poland.
Serbia and Montenegro	Hej, Slaveni	1992	Hej, Slaveni	2006	The same current anthem of Poland.
Slovak State	Hej, Slováci	1939	none (annexed into Czechoslovakia)	1945	The same current anthem of Poland.
USSR	State Anthem of the Soviet Union	1944	none (country collapsed)	1991	Still used by Russia.
Russia	State Anthem of the Russian Federation	2000	current anthem		Still used by Russia.
