= God Bless Africa =

God Bless Africa may refers to:

- "Ishe Komborera Africa", a former national anthem of Zimbabwe
- "Nkosi Sikelel' iAfrika", a Christian hymn composed in 1897 by Enoch Sontonga
- "Mungu ibariki Afrika", a national anthem of Tanzania
