= Rise, O Voices of Rhodesia =

National anthem of Rhodesia (1974–1979)

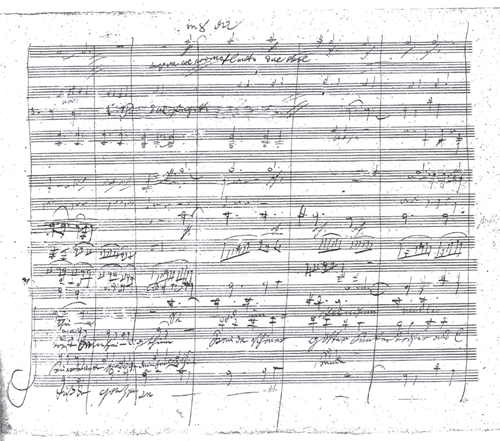
- A page from Beethoven's original manuscript
- Former national anthem of Rhodesia and Zimbabwe-Rhodesia
- Also known as: "Voices of Rhodesia"
- Lyrics: Mary Bloom, 1974
- Music: Ludwig van Beethoven, 1824 (arranged by Ken MacDonald, 1974)
- Adopted: August 1974
- Relinquished: December 1979
- Preceded by: God Save the King
- Succeeded by: Ishe Komborera Africa (as national anthem of Zimbabwe)

Audio sample
- "Rise, O Voices of Rhodesia" (instrumental): file; help

"Rise, O Voices of Rhodesia" (or "Voices of Rhodesia") was the national anthem of Rhodesia and Zimbabwe Rhodesia (renamed Zimbabwe in April 1980) between 1974 and 1979. The tune was that of "Ode to Joy", the Fourth Movement from Ludwig van Beethoven's Ninth Symphony, which had been adopted as the official European continental anthem by the Council of Europe in 1972, which remains the anthem of the European Union. The music used in Rhodesia was an original sixteen-bar arrangement by Captain Ken MacDonald, the bandmaster of the Rhodesian African Rifles. A national competition was organised by the government to find an appropriate set of lyrics to match the chosen tune, and won by Mary Bloom of Gwelo.

In the fallout from Rhodesia's Unilateral Declaration of Independence from the United Kingdom on 11 November 1965, the country still claimed loyalty to Queen Elizabeth II as its professed head of state, and so retained "God Save the Queen" as its national anthem. With Rhodesia's reconstitution in 1970 as a republic, however, the royal anthem was dropped along with many other references to the monarchy, leaving it without a national anthem until it adopted "Rise, O Voices of Rhodesia" in 1974. The national anthem lost its legal status in December 1979, when the United Kingdom retook interim control of the country pending its internationally recognised independence as Zimbabwe five months later. Rhodesia's use of the well-known Beethoven tune has since caused the playing of "Ode to Joy" to be controversial in modern-day Zimbabwe.

== History ==
=== Background ===
A dispute over the terms for the granting of full statehood to the self-governing colony of Rhodesia led its predominantly white minority government, headed by Prime Minister Ian Smith, to unilaterally declare independence from the UK on 11 November 1965. As Whitehall had been insisting on majority rule as a condition for independence, this declaration went unrecognised and caused the UK and the United Nations to impose economic sanctions on Rhodesia. Queen Elizabeth II continued to be "Queen of Rhodesia" in the eyes of Smith's government, hence "God Save the Queen" remained the Rhodesian national anthem. Though this was intended to demonstrate Rhodesia's enduring loyalty to the Queen, the retention of a song so associated with the UK in the midst of the Anglo-Rhodesian constitutional struggle soon gave Rhodesian state occasions "a faintly ironic tone", in the words of the London Times.

=== Adoption ===
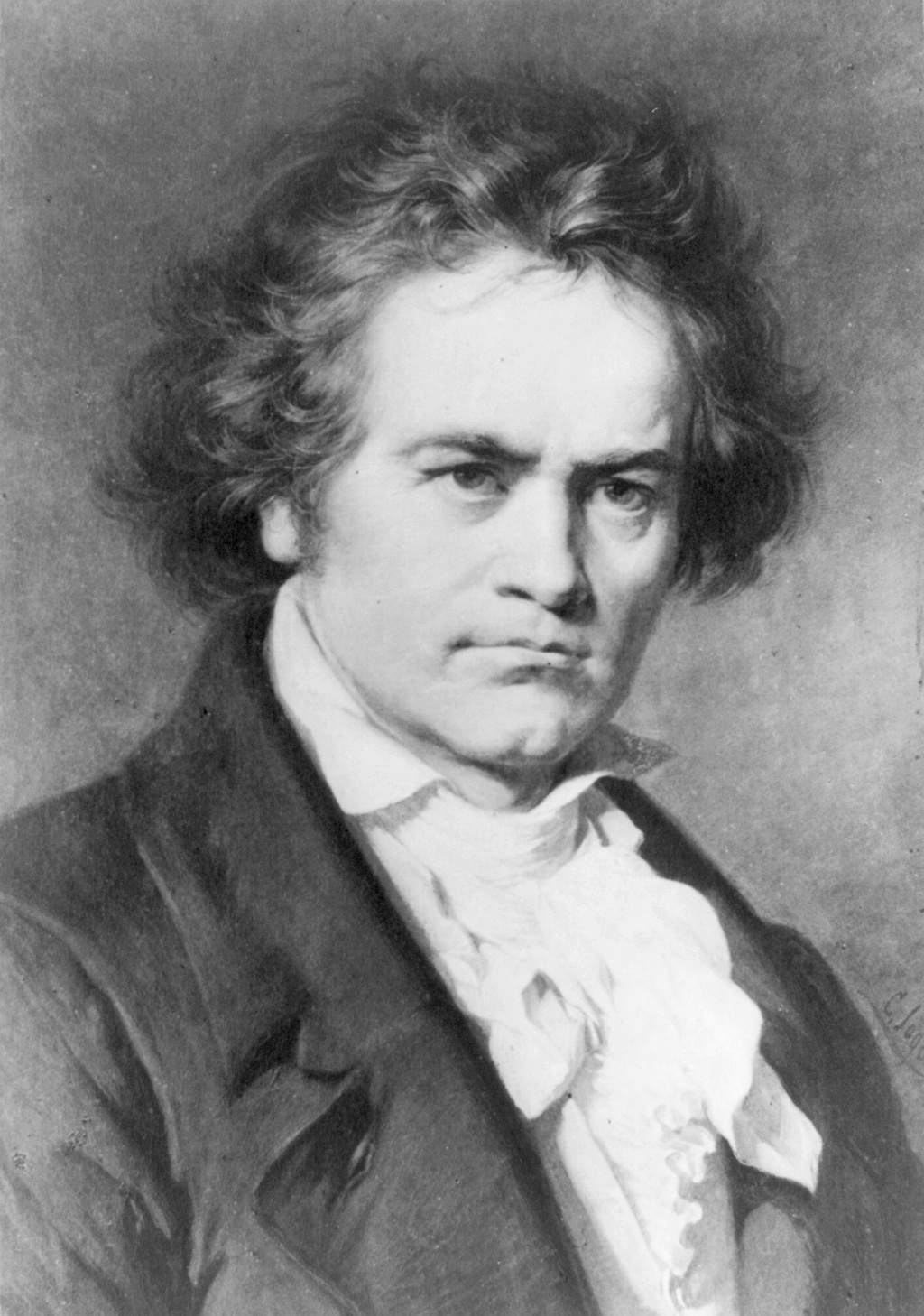
The Rhodesian anthem used a tune composed by Ludwig van Beethoven (pictured) in 1824.

The Rhodesian government initiated a search for a new anthem around the time of its adoption of a new green-and-white flag in November 1968, but continued to use "God Save the Queen" until June 1969, when the mostly white electorate voted in favour of a republican form of government. The royal anthem officially remained in place until the formal declaration of a republic in March 1970, when it was abandoned along with numerous other overt references to the Crown. Republican Rhodesia was without an anthem for over four years before the chosen music was announced on 28 August 1974: the Fourth Movement, commonly called "Ode to Joy", from Ludwig van Beethoven's Ninth Symphony. The fact that the Council of Europe had adopted this tune as the "Anthem of Europe" in January 1972 apparently did not perturb the Rhodesian government; John Sutherland and Stephen Fender comment that Rhodesia's choice proved deeply embarrassing for the UK's Labour government, whose leaders now had to respect a melody associated with Rhodesia when attending official European functions. With a tune now in place, the Rhodesian government organised a nationwide competition to write matching lyrics, the winner of which would receive a cash prize of R$500 (equal to about US$1,000).

The Council of Europe, though less than pleased with Rhodesia's selection, did not object to it, reasoning that so long as Rhodesia was using "Ode to Joy" in its original form, it could not be subject to reproach as the music was long out of copyright and in the public domain. It did announce, however, that should Rhodesia use the same arrangement as the Council of Europe, then the author of that score, Herbert von Karajan, would have grounds for a plagiarism lawsuit. Such an incident was averted when Rhodesia adopted an original sixteen-bar arrangement by Captain Ken MacDonald, the Rhodesian African Rifles' bandmaster. The anthem's inaugural instrumental performance in Salisbury provoked mixed reactions: some were enthusiastic—including a coloured sergeant musician who proudly told the Rhodesia Herald that "it's just like 'God Save Our Gracious Queen'"—but many others were disappointed that the government had not commissioned an original tune. Rhys Lewis, music critic for the Herald, wrote that he was "stupefied" by the government's choice, which he said was not only unoriginal, but also so associated with supranational brotherhood that it risked making internationally isolated Rhodesia the subject of ridicule. Phinias Sithole, who headed the African Trade Union Congress (a black Rhodesian trade union federation), commented that he did not believe most of the country's blacks would identify with a song chosen while people of their ethnicity remained largely absent from the government's top levels.

The winning lyricist was confirmed on 24 September 1974 to be Mary Bloom, a company director, music critic and poet from Gwelo, who had moved to Rhodesia from South Africa in 1947. Bloom titled her work "Voices of Rhodesia", but the full first line, "Rise, O Voices of Rhodesia", ultimately entered common parlance as the song's title.

Foreign observers were less than impressed; the British journalist Richard West, remarking that white Rhodesians were "renownedly philistine", asked "how could one not... squirm with embarrassment when the TV ends at night with the Rhodesian national anthem to the tune of Beethoven's Choral Symphony?"

== Lyrics ==
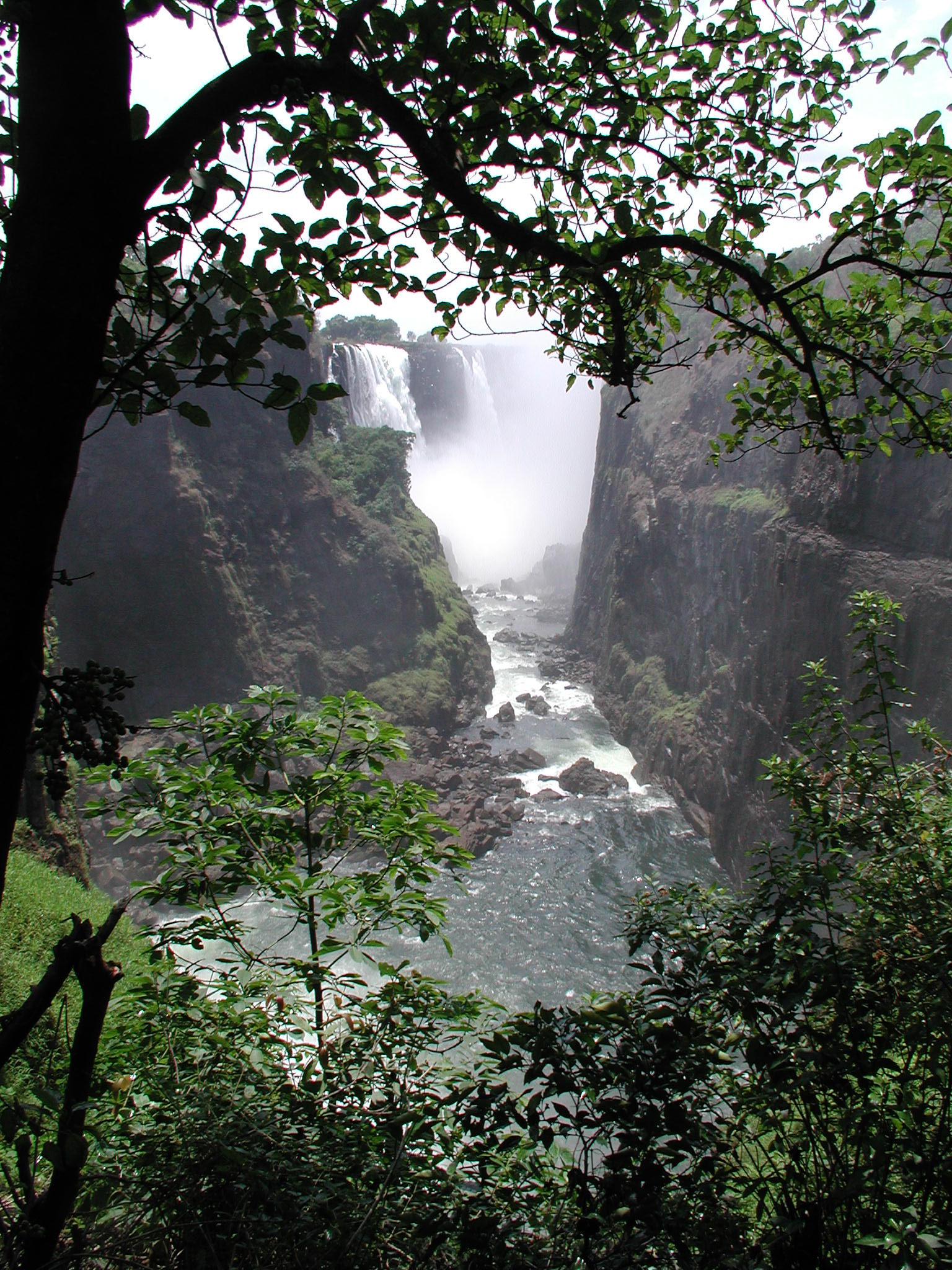
Victoria Falls. Historian J. L. Fisher writes that a major theme of the lyrics is the country's "magnificent landscape".

The lyrics officially adopted were as follows:

Rise, O voices of Rhodesia,
God may we Thy bounty share.
Give us strength to face all danger,
And where challenge is, to dare.
Guide us, Lord, to wise decision,
Ever of Thy grace aware,
Oh, let our hearts beat bravely always
For this land within Thy care.

Rise, O voices of Rhodesia,
Bringing her your proud acclaim,
Grandly echoing through the mountains,
Rolling o'er the far flung plain.
Roaring in the mighty rivers,
Joining in one grand refrain,
Ascending to the sunlit heavens,
Telling of her honoured name.

== Fall from use and legacy ==
"Rise, O Voices of Rhodesia" remained in official usage for the rest of Rhodesia's history, as well as between June and December 1979, when Rhodesia was reconstituted as Zimbabwe Rhodesia, a black-ruled version of the same country, which also failed to achieve legitimacy in the eyes of the United Kingdom and the United Nations. Though the anthem remained in place during these six months, a new flag was adopted and Rhodesia's national holidays, largely based around colonial figures and milestones, were replaced by alternatives intended to be more inclusive: President's Day, Unity Day and Ancestors Day. The national anthem remained unchanged on 12 December 1979, when Zimbabwe Rhodesia came under the UK's control for an interim period once again as Southern Rhodesia, before internationally recognised independence came in April 1980, with the country now called Zimbabwe. "Ishe Komborera Africa", a Shona translation of Enoch Sontonga's Xhosa hymn "Nkosi Sikelel' iAfrika" ("God Bless Africa" in English), was made Zimbabwe's first national anthem, and remained in place until 1994, when it was replaced by the present anthem, "Simudzai Mureza wedu WeZimbabwe" ("Blessed be the Land of Zimbabwe").

Because of its use by "Rise, O Voices of Rhodesia", the "Ode to Joy" melody is controversial in Zimbabwe, where its annual playing at foreign embassies on Europe Day initially caused shock to Zimbabwean government officials who, according to historian Josephine Fisher, had not previously been aware of the tune's use by the Council of Europe. During the 1980s, Derek Hudson, the long-time conductor of the Bulawayo Philharmonic Orchestra, had considerable difficulty securing official permission to give the first Zimbabwean performance of Beethoven's Ninth Symphony. He was eventually able to do so, but only after prolonged negotiations with the authorities. When "Ode to Joy" was included in a fundraising organ recital held by a Harare church at Christmas 1994, it provoked angry protests from some who attended.
