= Sindiswa Sidwell Mhlongo =

South African conductor (born 1973)

- Mhlongo in 2025
- Born: 18 March 1973 (age 53)
- Education: BA Hons (Music) in Conducting
- Alma mater: University of the Witwatersrand
- Occupations: Conductor, Chorus Master, Orchestrator
- Known for: Conductor and Chorus Master of the Gauteng Choristers

Sindiswa Sidwell Mhlongo (born 18 March 1973) is a South African conductor and chorus master, best known for his long-standing association with the Gauteng Choristers. He has conducted and prepared choirs for major classical and operatic works both in South Africa and internationally.

== Career ==
=== Work with Gauteng Choristers ===
In 2000, Mhlongo was recruited to conduct the Gauteng Choristers. He was appointed chorus master for the ensemble in 2004 for performances of Emeritus Professor Mzilikazi Khumalo's epic cantata, uShaka kaSenzangakhona. He led the choir on an extensive international tour of this work, performing in Italy, Hungary, Switzerland, Austria, the Netherlands, Belgium, and Spain. In 2006, they performed the cantata at the Ravinia Festival in Chicago, USA, with the Chicago Symphony Orchestra.

As chorus master for the Gauteng Choristers, Mhlongo prepared the ensemble for numerous major performances, including:

- A concert version of George Gershwin's opera, Porgy and Bess, at international festivals in Italy, Switzerland, and the Netherlands in August 2007.
- The world premiere of Bongani Ndodana-Breen’s Winnie, The Opera, at the State Theatre in Pretoria in 2012.
- A collaboration in 2019 with the Minnesota Chorale and Orchestra in the USA for a performance of Vaughan Williams’s Dona nobis pacem.
- A performance of Mahler’s Symphony No. 2 "Resurrection" in 2023, accompanied by the Boston Philharmonic Youth Orchestra under the direction of Benjamin Zander.

He also conducted the Gauteng Choristers in a 2015 performance of uShaka kaSenzangakhona at the Joburg Theatre, and a 2017 performance of Mozart’s Requiem featuring soloists Pretty Yende and Sibongile Khumalo.

=== Conducting and other engagements ===
Mhlongo has worked with numerous other ensembles. In 2008, he conducted Philip Miller’s Rewind Cantata at the Market Theatre. He was subsequently invited to conduct the work at the Royal Festival Hall in London in 2010 and with the Cape Town Opera chorus in 2011.

He has also served as chorus master for the Joburg Theatre’s productions of Mozart's operas The Magic Flute in 2016 and Don Giovanni in 2022.

=== Other contributions ===
Mhlongo is an orchestrator, having arranged Michael Moerane’s Matlala and Mzilikazi Khumalo’s Kwadedangendlale. From 2010 to 2012, he was the music director for the SABC 1 programme Imizwilili. He was also a radio presenter for SAfm from 2012 to 2021.

== See also ==
- Gauteng Choristers
- Mzilikazi Khumalo
- Johannesburg Philharmonic Orchestra
- Bongani Ndodana-Breen
- Sibongile Khumalo
