= Axali Doëseb =

Namibian music composer (1954–2023)

Axali Doëseb (1954 – 27 October 2023) was a Namibian music composer. He wrote and composed "Namibia, Land of the Brave", which has been the national anthem of the country since 1991. He also served as conductor of the Namibian National Symphony Orchestra.

The composition of the National anthem was supervised by Hidipo Hamutenya, then chairman of the National Symbols subcommittee. In 2006 Hamutenya claimed that he authored the lyrics himself, "on the plane to Cuba", a claim that Doëseb denied.

== Biography ==
Axali Doëseb was born in 1954 in Okahandja into a musical family; his father Casper Doëseb played the violin and his sister Mathilde Doëses was a singer. Exposed to music during his school years, he took piano lessons at Martin Luther High School, Okombahe. He also joined a school band, The Ugly Creatures, which was judged as "pioneers of church and dance stage music". The Uglies released three albums.

Doëseb later composed liturgy for the Evangelical Lutheran Church in Namibia. Doëseb earned his degree in music at the Musikschule Herford, in Germany. In 1997, he earned a B.A. in Musicology at Marlborough College, in the United Kingdom. As a well-known composer, Doëseb was asked by several schools to write their school songs. He was also the chairman of the committee tasked with composing an anthem for the African Union in Addis Ababa, Ethiopia. In 2014, he was given a lifetime achievement award at the Namibian Annual Music Awards (NAMAs).

Doëseb suffered from diabetes and had one leg amputated in 2023. He was granted "veteran" status by Namibia's government and lived in Katutura, Windhoek. He died on 27 October, at the age of 69.
