= Namibia, Land of the Brave =

National anthem of Namibia

- National anthem of Namibia
- Lyrics: Axali Doëseb, 1991
- Music: Axali Doëseb, 1991
- Adopted: December 1991
- Preceded by: "Nkosi Sikelel' iAfrika"

Audio sample
- US Navy Band instrumental version: file; help

"Namibia, Land of the Brave" is the national anthem of Namibia, adopted in December 1991. It was composed by Axali Doëseb, who was the director of a traditional music group from the Kalahari Desert. Doëseb was chosen to compose it after winning a contest held after Namibia became independent in 1990.

== History ==
Namibia's first national anthem, albeit unofficial, was "Das Südwesterlied" while under German colonization as German South-West Africa. After it became South-West Africa as a League of Nations mandate under the Union of South Africa, the national anthem was changed to "Die Stem van Suid-Afrika" to match South Africa's. Following independence, "Nkosi Sikelel' iAfrika" was provisionally adopted as a temporary national anthem pending the formal adoption of an official national anthem. It was later decided that Namibia needed a unique anthem, and a national competition was held to compose a new national anthem. The competition was won by Axali Doeseb with "Namibia, Land of the Brave". The anthem was first played in public in a ceremony on the first anniversary of Namibia's independence from South Africa in 1991. The similarity of the lyric's first-line phrase "Land of the Brave" to the end of "The Star-Spangled Banner", the national anthem of the United States, has been noted by commentators.

The composition of the Namibian national anthem was supervised by Hidipo Hamutenya, then chairman of the National Symbols subcommittee. In 2006, Hamutenya claimed that he authored the lyrics himself, "on the plane to Cuba". Doëseb denied this claim. In 2023, politicians Andrew Matjila and Ben Amadhila supported Hamutenya's claim.

== Legislation ==
The Parliament of Namibia passed the National Anthem of the Republic of Namibia Act, 1991. This confirmed "Namibia, Land of the Brave" as the national anthem of Namibia; made it an offense to insult it, with punishment upon conviction of up to five years imprisonment or up to a 20,000-rand fine or both; and allowed the President of Namibia to create regulations relating to it.

== Lyrics ==
English lyrics

Namibia, land of the brave
Freedom fight we have won
Glory to their bravery
Whose blood waters our freedom

We give our love and loyalty
Together in unity
Contrasting beautiful Namibia
Namibia our country

Beloved land of savannahs,
Hold high the banner of liberty

Namibia our Country,
Namibia Motherland,
We love thee.

German translation

Namibia, Land der Tapferen.
Der Freiheitskampf ist gewonnen,
Ehre ihrem Mut,
Deren Blut floss für unsere Freiheit.

Wir geben unsere Liebe und Treue
In Einigkeit gemeinsam,
Kontrastreiches schönes Namibia,
Namibia unser Land.

Geliebtes Land der Savannen,
Haltet das Banner der Freiheit hoch.

Namibia unser Land,
Namibia, Mutterland,
Wir lieben Dich.

Afrikaans translation

Namibië, Land van die Dapperes,
Vryheidstryd het ons gewen.
Ere aan hul dapperheid
Wie se bloed ons vryheid waterlei.

Ons gee ons liefde en lojaliteit
Tesame in eenheid.
Kontrasterende pragtige Namibië,
Namibië, onse Land.

Geliefde Land van savannas,
Hou hoog die vaandel van vryheid.

Namibië, onse Land,
Namibië, Moederland,
Ons is lief vir Jou.
