= Jeanne Zaidel-Rudolph =

South African composer, pianist and teacher

Jeanne Zaidel-Rudolph OIB
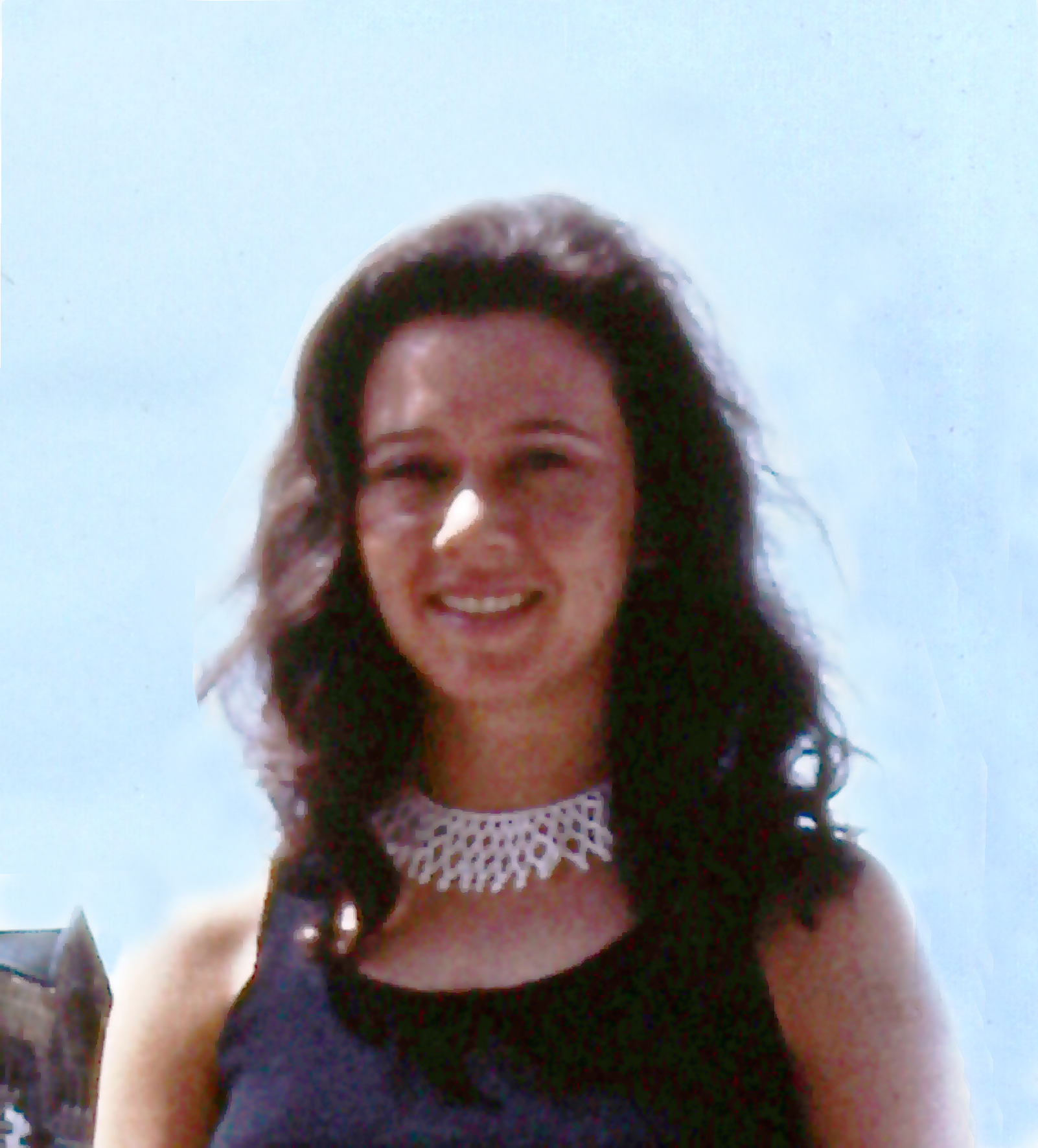
- Zaidel visiting Darmstadt, West Germany in August 1974
- Born: 9 July 1948 (age 77); Transvaal, South Africa
- Education: Doctorate in Composition
- Alma mater: University of Pretoria
- Occupations: Composer, pianist and teacher
- Notable work: "National anthem of South Africa"
- Spouse: Michael Rudolph

Jeanne Zaidel-Rudolph OIB (born 9 July 1948) is a South African composer, pianist and teacher. She was the first woman in South Africa to obtain a doctorate in composition. She arranged the composition of the South African national anthem and also wrote its final verse.

== Education ==
Zaidel-Rudolph was born in Transvaal, South Africa, and began playing the piano at age five. She studied at the University of Pretoria under Stefans Grové and others. She went on to study at the Royal College of Music in London, where she received tuition in composition from John Lambert and Tristram Carey. After meeting György Ligeti she was invited to join his class in Hamburg. Ligeti's use of contrapuntal devices and tone colour proved a major influence.

Zaidel-Rudolph also specialised in piano performance; her teachers included Goldie Zaidel, Philip Levy and Adolph Hallis in South Africa, and John Lill in London. Zaidel-Rudolph returned to South Africa and became the first woman in the country to obtain a Doctorate in Composition, in 1979 at the University of Pretoria under Stefans Grové.

== Career ==
In 1988, the first complete commercial recording of the works of a South African art music composer featured her music on an EMI album. She was commissioned to write a work (Oratorio for Human Rights) for the Atlanta Olympics in 1996. In 1995, she arranged a composite version of South Africa's erstwhile and new national anthems at the request of President Nelson Mandela. She also composed a song ("He walked to Freedom") for his honorary doctorate ceremony in 1997. In 2000, 2002, and 2003, she participated in the show Celebration in Canada, the US and the UK for which she composed, conducted and orchestrated the music.

Zaidel-Rudolph's compositional output covers most musical genres, ranging from the large scale symphony to chamber, choral, ballet, rock opera, film and solo instrumental music. Her works are regularly performed in Africa, Europe and the Americas.

Zaidel-Rudolph has also made a tremendous contribution to Jewish music in Johannesburg. In 2013, she wrote the Jewish-themed "Hebrotica", a work for marimba solo, dedicated to and premiered by klezmer virtuoso Alex Jacobowitz in Johannesburg.

She is closely associated with the Sydenham-Highlands North Hebrew Congregation, whose male choir has released many compositions written by Zaidel-Rudolph. "Her style reflects both the inspiration of religious mysticism and the richness of a transcultural approach which merges African and Western musical elements."

Zaidel-Rudolph has been working at the School of Music of the University of the Witwatersrand since 1975, where she is a Professor of Composition.

== Honours ==
- 1974, she was the first South African composer to be awarded the Cobbett Prize for composition at the Royal College of Music.
