= Catharina van Rees =

Dutch author, editor and composer

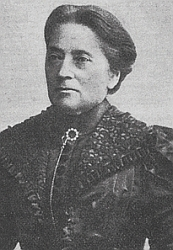
- Catharina Felicia van Rees
- Born: 22 August 1831; Zutphen, Netherlands
- Died: 1 April 1915 (aged 83); Velp, Gelderland, Netherlands
- Occupations: Author, editor, and composer
- Notable work: National anthem of the Transvaal

Catharina Felicia van Rees (22 August 1831 – 1 April 1915) was an author, editor, and composer. She wrote novels about the lives of composers and edited a collection of "Dutch Authoresses" to use the language of the time. She wrote her novels under the pseudonym Celéstine. She favored the education of Dutch women and for women to show their talents "into the light and let it shine forth." That stated the Dutch aspect of this was important to her as well and she was willing to include male writers if not enough Dutch women writers were available. She is also of some interest in the History of South Africa as she wrote the National anthem of the Transvaal.
