= Mzilikazi Khumalo =

South African composer (1932–2021)

- Born: James Steven Mzilikazi Khumalo; 20 June 1932; KwaNgwelu, Natal, Union of South Africa
- Died: 22 June 2021 (aged 89)
- Occupations: Composer and professor

James Steven Mzilikazi Khumalo (20 June 1932 – 22 June 2021) was a South African composer and professor emeritus of African languages at the University of the Witwatersrand.

== Early life ==
Khumalo was born on the farm KwaNgwelu in Natal in 1932. Shortly after Khumalo's birth, his parents were ordained ministers in the Salvation Army, which ran the farm at the time. The family moved to Hlabisa, where Khumalo started school.

== Scholar of African languages ==
After completing high school Khumalo enrolled at the teachers' training college in Mamelodi. He continued his studies, obtaining a bachelor's degree with majors in English and Zulu in 1956 from the University of South Africa. He went on to obtain master's degree and, in 1988, a PhD, both from the University of the Witwatersrand, Johannesburg.

Khumalo's career in the Department of African Languages of the University of the Witwatersrand, Johannesburg began in 1969, when he held a position as a tutor. He advanced to become a professor of African languages and head of the Department of African Languages at Wits.

== Composer ==
His first composition was Ma Ngificwa Ukufa, which had its premiere in 1959.

His compositions consist principally of settings of Zulu texts. His Five African Songs is an arrangement of four traditional songs and one modern tune for choir and symphony orchestra. It has been recorded by the South African National Symphony Orchestra and Chamber Choir of the South African Broadcasting Corporation, conducted by Richard Cock. Two of the five songs are in the Xhosa language, and the other three are in Zulu. The piece has also been orchestrated by Peter Louis Van Dijk.

In 1986 he composed a choral work for the enthronement of Archbishop Desmond Tutu. Khumalo is also the composer of the cantata uShaka KaSenzangakhona, which tells the story of the Zulu king, Shaka.

Khumalo was commissioned by Opera Africa for an opera, resulting in Princess Magogo kaDinuzulu (2002), a work about the Zulu princess, musician and poet Princess Constance Magogo kaDinuzulu. The opera was the first Zulu language opera.

He also played a role in producing the official post-apartheid version of the National Anthem of South Africa, at the request of President Nelson Mandela.

== Works on the phonology of Zulu ==
- An autosegmental account of Zulu phonology (PhD). University of the Witwatersrand. 10 November 2014. hdl:10539/15848.
- "Zulu tonology". African Studies. 41 (1): 3–125. 1982. doi:10.1080/00020188208707579. ISSN 0002-0184.

== Awards and honours ==
In 2015 Wits University awarded him an honorary doctorate.

== Death ==
On 22 June 2021, Mzilikazi Khumalo died two days after his 89th birthday following a long illness.
