= National anthem of South Africa =

National Anthem of South Africa
- The South African national anthem as it appears specified in the South African Government Gazette
- National anthem of South Africa
- Also known as: "Nkosi Sikelel' iAfrika" (first segment) (English: "Lord Bless Africa") "Die Stem van Suid-Afrika" (second segment) (English: "The Call of South Africa")
- Lyrics: Enoch Sontonga, 1897; Cornelis Jacobus Langenhoven, 1918; Jeanne Zaidel-Rudolph, 1995
- Music: Enoch Sontonga, 1897; Marthinus Lourens de Villiers, 1921 (arranged by Mzilikazi Khumalo and Jeanne Zaidel-Rudolph, 1995)
- Adopted: 1997
- Preceded by: "Die Stem van Suid-Afrika" and "Nkosi Sikelel' iAfrika"

Audio sample
- U.S. Navy Band instrumental version: file; help

National Anthem of South Africa
- Zulu: iNgoma-Yesizwe yaseNingizimu Afrika
- Xhosa: uMhobe weSizwe waseMzantsi Afrika
- Afrikaans: Volkslied van Suid-Afrika
- Sepedi: Koša ya Naga ya Afrika Borwa
- Swazi: Umlandvo we Ngoma yeSive yase Ningizimu Afrika
- Sesotho: Pina ya Naha ya Afrika Borwa
- Setswana: Pina ya Bosetšhaba ya Afrika Borwa
- Xitsonga: Matimu ya Risimu ra Rixaka ra Afrika
- Venda: Ḓivhazwakale ya Luimbo lwa Lushaka lwa Afrika Tshipembe
- Southern Ndebele: Zimu Busisa i-Afrika

The national anthem of South Africa was adopted in 1997 and is a hybrid song combining extracts of the 19th century Xhosa hymn "Nkosi Sikelel' iAfrika" (English: "God Bless Africa", lit. '"Lord Bless Africa"') and the Afrikaans song that was used as the South African national anthem during the apartheid era, "Die Stem van Suid-Afrika" (English: "The Voice of South Africa"), with new English lyrics.

The anthem is often referred to by its incipit of "Nkosi Sikelel' iAfrika", but this has never been its official title, which is simply "National Anthem of South Africa".

The committee responsible for this new composition included Anna Bender, Elize Botha, Richard Cock, Dolf Havemann (Secretary), Mzilikazi Khumalo (chairman), Masizi Kunene, John Lenake, Fatima Meer, Khabi Mngoma, Wally Serote, Johan de Villiers, and Jeanne Zaidel-Rudolph.

== Structure ==
The lyrics employ the five most widely spoken of South Africa's twelve official languages – Xhosa (first stanza, first two lines), Zulu (first stanza, last two lines), Sesotho (second stanza), Afrikaans (third stanza), and English (final stanza). The lyrics are sung in these languages regardless of the native language of the singer. The first half was arranged by Mzilikazi Khumalo and the latter half of the song was arranged by Jeanne Zaidel-Rudolph, who also wrote the final verse. The anthem is compositionally unusual as it employs progressive tonality, starting in G major but modulating to and ending in D major (the Italian, Spanish, and Philippine national anthems also have progressive tonality).

== History ==
=== Background ===
From the late 1940s to the early 1990s, South Africa was governed by a system known as apartheid, a widely condemned system of institutionalized racial segregation and discrimination that was based on white supremacy and the repression of the black majority for the benefit of the politically and economically dominant Afrikaner minority and other whites. During this period, South Africa's national anthem was "Die Stem van Suid-Afrika", also known as "Die Stem", an Afrikaans-language song that chronicled the Voortrekkers and the Great Trek. "Die Stem" is a poem written by C. J. Langenhoven in 1918 and was set to music by Marthinus Lourens de Villiers in 1921. "Die Stem" (English: "The voice of South Africa") was the co-national anthem with "God Save the King" (Note: Subsequently "God Save the Queen" when Elizabeth II acceded to the throne following the death of George VI.) between 1938 and 1957, when it became the sole national anthem until 1994. "Die Stem van Suid-Afrika" was composed of eight stanzas: the original four in Afrikaans and four in English - a translation of the Afrikaans with a few modifications. It was seldom sung in its entirety; usually, the first stanza was the most widely known and sung sometimes followed by the last stanza.

When apartheid came to an end in the early 1990s, the future of "Die Stem van Suid-Afrika" was called into question. It was ultimately retained as the national anthem, though "Nkosi Sikelel' iAfrika", a Xhosa language song that was used by the anti-apartheid movement, was also introduced and adopted as a second national anthem of equal standing. "Nkosi Sikelel' iAfrika" was composed by a Methodist school teacher named Enoch Sontonga in 1897. It was first sung as a church hymn but later became an act of political defiance against the apartheid regime.

The South African government adopted both songs as dual national anthems in 1994, when they were performed at Nelson Mandela's inauguration.

For the 1995 Rugby World Cup, Morné du Plessis suggested that the Springboks learn all the words of "Nkosi Sikelel' iAfrika", and "they did so with great feeling", according to their instructor Anne Munnik.

National Anthem of South Africa, with 2 audio in different years.

=== Inception ===
The practice of having two national anthems proved to be a cumbersome arrangement as performing both of them took as much as five minutes. This was rectified when South Africa's dual national anthems were merged in abridged forms in early 1997 to form the current national anthem. The new national anthem was performed at an opening of the South African parliament in February 1997, and was published in the South African Government Gazette on 10 October 1997. During the drafting of the new national anthem, it was requested by South African president Nelson Mandela that it be not more than one minute and 48 seconds in length (which was the average length of other countries' anthems being used for reference). The new English lyrics were adapted from the last four lines of the first stanza of "Die Stem van Suid-Afrika" (English: "The Call of South Africa"), with the changes made to reflect hope in post-apartheid South African society.

Lines borrowed from the two previous national anthems were modified to be more inclusive, omitting overt reference to specific groups of the country's population groups. Thus, lines from the apartheid-era national anthem's first stanza referencing the Voortrekkers' Great Trek were omitted, as "this was the experience of only one section of" South African society. Likewise, the words "Woza Moya" ("Come, Spirit"), used in the Zulu version of "Nkosi Sikelel' iAfrika" were also omitted, as the phrase is a specifically Christian reference, rather than a generically religious one, and thus not acceptable to South Africans of other religions, particularly Muslim South Africans. A new verse found in neither song was also added. The English version of "Die Stem van Suid-Afrika" was less prominent than the Afrikaans version and thus could be changed with little objection or controversy. As such, the English portion of the new South African national anthem was the one that had its lyrics changed from the previous version.

=== Criticism ===
In recent years, the South African national anthem has come under criticism for its Afrikaans verse as it was originally part of the national anthem of South Africa that was used during the apartheid era, with some such as the Economic Freedom Fighters calling for the verse to be removed, supposedly because of this connection. Others defend the inclusion of the verse, pointing out that it is included in large part due to the wishes of the first post-apartheid South African president, Nelson Mandela, who intended its inclusion as a reconciliatory measure for the post-apartheid future of South Africa.

== Lyrics ==
First verse, first two lines in Xhosa (with IPA transcription (Note: See Help:IPA/Nguni and Xhosa language § Phonology.) and English translation)
Nkosi sikelel' iAfrika; Maluphakanyisw' uphondo lwayo	[ŋkʼɔ.si si.kʼɛ.lɛl i.a.fri.kʼa] [ma.lu.pʰa.kʼa.n̠ʲi.s(w)‿u.pʰɔ.ndɔ lwa.jɔ]	God bless Africa; May her horn rise up high
First verse, last two lines in Zulu (with IPA transcription (Note: See Help:IPA/Nguni and Zulu language § Orthography.) and English translation)
Yizwa imithandazo yethu Nkosi sikelela, thina lusapho lwayo.	[ji.zwa i.mi.tʰa.nd̤a.zɔ jɛ.tʰu] [ŋkʼɔ.si si.kʼɛ.lɛ.la tʰi.na lu.sa.pʰɔ lwa.jɔ]	Hear our prayers Lord bless us, as your children.
Second verse in Sotho (with IPA transcription (Note: See Help:IPA, Sesotho orthography § Sotho alphabet and Sotho phonology.) and English translation)
Morena boloka setjhaba sa heso, O fedise dintwa le matshwenyeho, O se boloke, O se boloke setjhaba sa heso, Setjhaba sa, South Afrika, South Afrika.	[mʊ.ʀɛ.nɑ bʊ.lʊ.kʼɑ sɪ.t͡ʃʰɑ.bɑ sɑ ɦɛ.sʊ] [ʊ fɛ.di.sɛ di.ntʼwɑ lɪ mɑ.t͡sʰwɛ.ɲɛ.ɦɔ] [ʊ sɪ bʊ.lʊ.kʼɛ ʊ sɪ bʊ.lʊ.kʼɛ sɪ.t͡ʃʰɑ.bɑ sɑ ɦɛ.sʊ] [sɪ.t͡ʃʰɑ.bɑ sɑ sɑu̯θ ɑf.ɹɪ.kɑ sɑu̯θ ɑf.ɹɪ.kɑ]	Lord we ask You to protect our nation, End all conflicts and troubles Protect us, protect our nation, The nation of South Africa, South Africa.
Third verse in Afrikaans (with IPA transcription (Note: See Help:IPA/Afrikaans and Afrikaans phonology.) and English translation)
Uit die blou van onse hemel, Uit die diepte van ons see, Oor ons ewige gebergtes Waar die kranse antwoord gee.	[œi̯(t)‿di blœu̯ fan ˈɔn.sə ˈɦɪə.məɫ] [œi̯(t)‿di ˈdip.tə fan ɔns sɪə] [ʊə̯r ɔns ˈɪə.və.χə χə.ˈbɛrχ.təs] [vɑːr di ˈkran.sə ˈant.vuə̯rt χɪə]	From the blue of our heavens From the depths of our sea, Over our eternal mountain ranges Where the cliffs give (the) answer.
Fourth verse in English
Sounds the call to come together, And united we shall stand. Let us live and strive for freedom, In South Africa, our land.

=== Translations ===
Besides English, the anthem has also been fully translated into the other official languages of South Africa.

== See also ==
- National anthem of Tanzania
- National anthem of Zambia
- National anthem of the Transvaal
- National anthem of the Orange Free State
- Lefatshe leno la bo-rrarona (Bophuthatswana anthem)
- Pfano na vhuthihi (Venda anthem)
- List of national anthems
