= National anthem of the Orange Free State =

National anthem of the 1854–1902 Boer republic

Vrystaatse Volkslied
English: The national anthem of the Orange Free State
- Anthem of the Orange Free State
- Lyrics: H.A.L Hamelberg
- Music: W.F.G Nicolai
- Adopted: 1854
- Relinquished: 1902

Audio sample
- "National anthem of the Orange Free State": file; help

The national anthem of the Orange Free State (Afrikaans: Vrystaatse Volkslied, Dutch: Volkslied van de Oranje Vrijstaat) was used from 1854 until 1902 as the national anthem of the Orange Free State.

== Lyrics ==
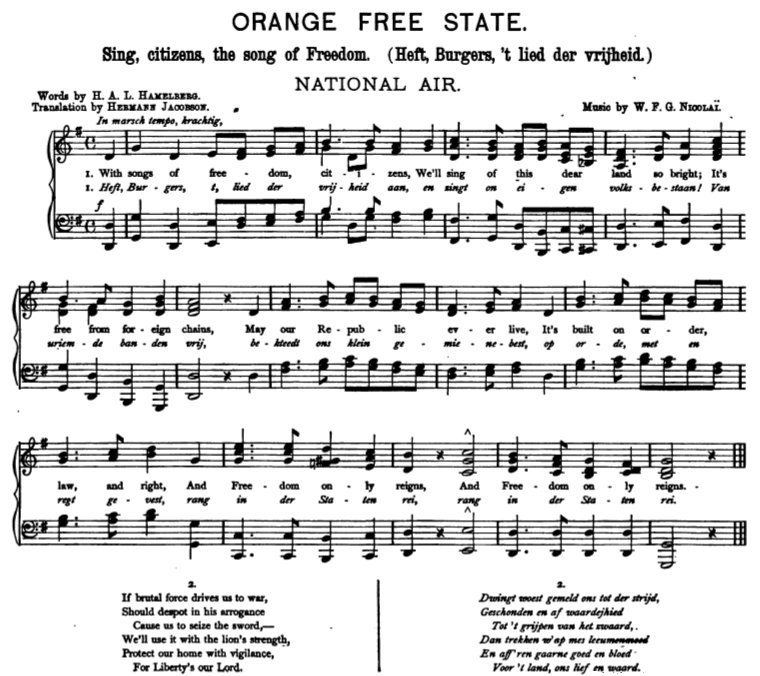
Score as published in National, Patriotic and Typical Airs of all Lands.

Dutch original

Heft, Burgers, 't lied der vrijheid aan
En zingt ons eigen volksbestaan!
Van vreemde banden vrij,
Bekleedt ons klein gemenebest,
Op orde, wet en recht gevest,
Rang in der Staten rij.
Rang in der Staten rij.

Al heeft ons land een klein begin,
Wij gaan met moed de toekomst in,
Het oog op God gericht,
Die niet beschaamt wie op Hem bouwt,
Op Hem als op een burcht vertrouwt,
Die voor geen stormen zwicht.
Die voor geen stormen zwicht.

Zie in gena' en liefde neer
Op onze President, o Heer!
Wees Gij zijn toeverlaat!
De taak, die op zijn schouders rust,
Vervulle hij met trouw en lust
Tot heil van volk en staat!
Tot heil van volk en staat!

Bescherm, o God, de Raad van't land,
Geleid hem aan Uw vaderhand,
Verlicht hem van omhoog,
Opdat zijn werk geheiligd zij
En vaderland en burgerij
Ten zegen strekken moog'!
Ten zegen strekken moog'!

Heil, driewerf heil de dierb're Staat,
het Volk, de President, de Raad!
Ja, bloei' naar ons gezang
De Vrijstaat en zijn burgerij,
In deugden groot, van smetten vrij,
Nog tal van eeuwen lang!
Nog tal van eeuwen lang!

Afrikaans translation

Hef Burgers, lied van vryheid aan,
Besing ons eie volksbestaan!
Van vreemde bande vry
Beklee ons klein gemenebes,
Op orde, wet en reg gestig,
Rang in die Statebond
Rang in die Statebond.

Al het ons land 'n klein begin,
Ons gaan met moed die toekoms in
Ons oog op God gerig
Wat nie beskaam wie op Hom bou
Op Hom as 'n rots vertrou,
Wat voor geen storm swig
Wat voor geen storm swig.

Sien in genade en liefde neer
Op ons President o Heer
Wees U sy toevlugsoort
Die taak, wat op sy skouers rus
Vervul hy met trou en lus
Tot heil van volk en staat
Ror heil van volk en staat!

Beskerm o God, die Land se Raad,
Lei hom aan U Vaderhand,
Verlig hom van omhoog,
Sodat sy werk geheilig word.
En Vaderland en burgerland
tot U seën mag strek
Tot U seën mag strek.

Heil driewerf, heil die dierbare staat
Die Volk, die President, die Raad!
Ja, bloei na ons gesang
Die Vrystaat en sy Burgers
In Deugde groot, van smet bevry,
Dog baie eeue heen
Nog baie eeue voort.

English translation

Raise, citizens, the song of freedom
and our own existence as a people.
Free from foreign bonds,
Holds our small commonwealth
founded on order, law and justice
Rank among the states
Rank among the states

Even though our land has a small beginning,
we step into the future with courage,
our eye fixed on God,
Who does not shame who builds on Him
and trusts in Him as a fortress
that does not yield to any storms
that does not yield to any storms

Look down in mercy
on our President, o Lord!
Be Thou his recourse
The task that rests on his shoulders
may he fulfill with loyalty and eagerness
to the benefit of people and state
to the benefit of people and state

Protect, o God, the Council of the land
Guide it by your Fatherly Hand
Illuminate it from above
So that its work may be sanctified
and may serve to bless
fatherland and citizenry.
fatherland and citizenry.

Hail, thrice hail, the beloved State,
the People, the President, the Council!
Yes, may flourish at our song
the Free State and its citizens.
great in virtue, free of stains
for many ages to come!
for many ages to come!

== See also ==
- National anthem of South Africa
- "Die Stem van Suid-Afrika"
- National anthem of the Transvaal
- List of national anthems
