= National anthem of the Transvaal =

National anthem

Transvaalse Volkslied
English: "Transvaal National Anthem"
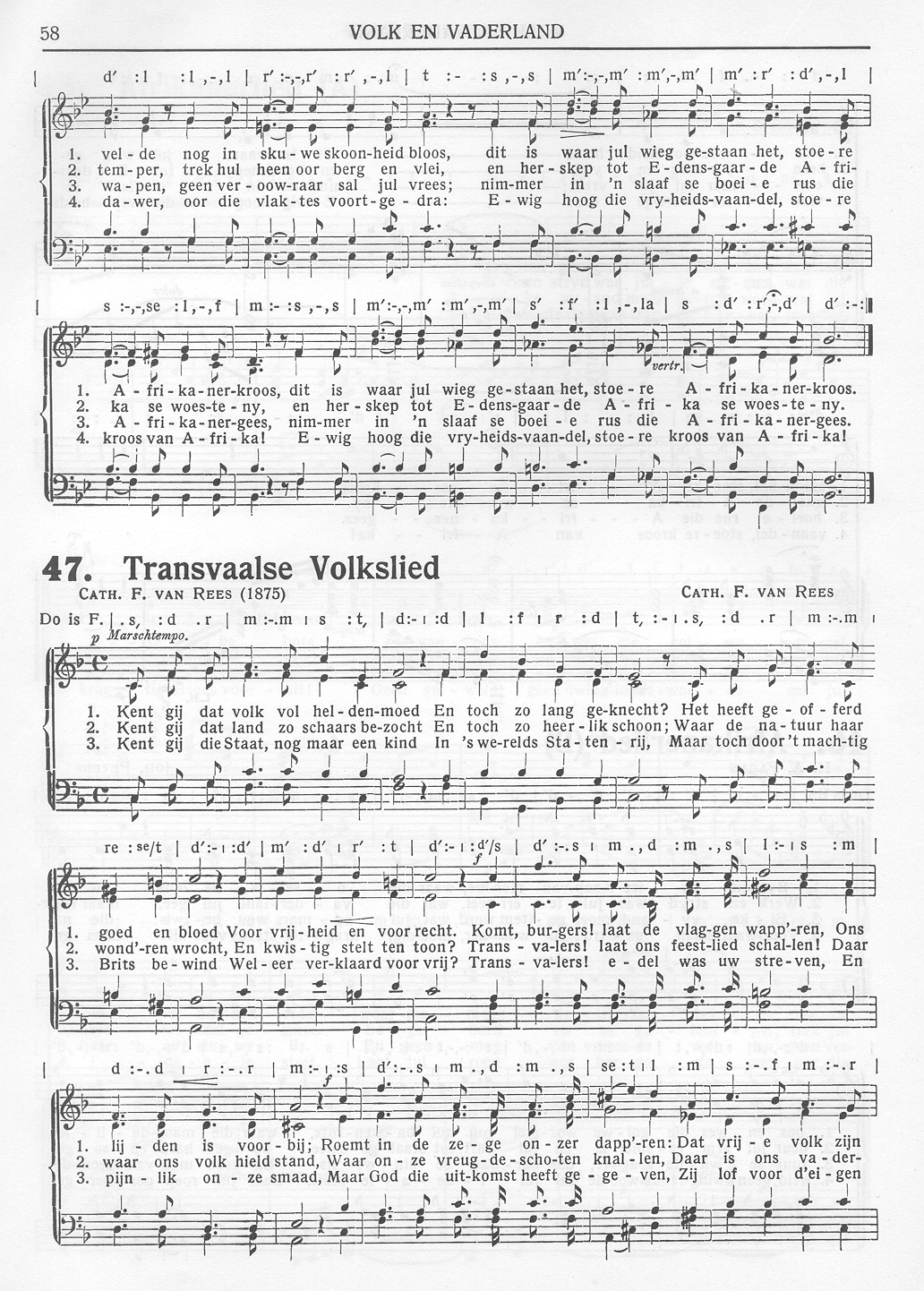
- Excerpt from the F.A.K.-Volksangbundel
- National anthem of the South African Republic
- Lyrics: Catharina van Rees, 1875
- Music: Catharina van Rees, 1875

Audio sample
- The national anthem of the South African Republic (Vocal): file; help

Instrumental(Piano)

The "Transvaal National Anthem" (Afrikaans and Dutch: Transvaalse Volkslied) was the national anthem of the South African Republic, also known as the Transvaal Republic. It was written and composed by Catharina van Rees in 1875, and was presented to president Thomas Burgers during his 1875 visit to Europe.

== Lyrics ==
Dutch lyrics

Kent gĳ dat volk vol heldenmoed
En toch zo lang geknecht?
Het heeft geofferd goed en bloed
Voor vrĳheid en voor recht
Komt burgers! laat de vlaggen wapp'ren
Ons lĳden is voorbĳ;
Roemt in de zege onzer dapp'ren
Dat vrĳe volk zĳn wĳ!
Dat vrĳe volk, dat vrĳe volk
Dat vrĳe, vrĳe volk zĳn wĳ!

Kent gĳ dat land zo schaars bezocht
En toch zo heerlĳk schoon
Waar de natuur haar wond'ren wrocht
En kwistig stelt ten toon?
Transvalers! laat ons feestlied schallen
Daar waar ons volk hield stand
Waar onze vreugdeschoten knallen
Daar is ons vaderland!
Dat heerlĳk land, dat heerlĳk land
Dat is, dat is ons vaderland!

Kent gĳ de Staat, nog maar een kind
In 's werelds Statenrĳ
Maar toch door 't machtig Brits bewind
Weleerd verklaard voor vrĳ?
Transvalers! edel was uw streven
En pĳnlĳk onze smaad
Maar God die uitkomst heeft gegeven
Zĳ lof voor d'eigen Staat!
Looft onze God! looft onze God!
Looft onze God voor land en Staat!

Afrikaans lyrics

Ken jy die Volk vol heldemoed
en tog so lank verkneg
Hy het geoffer goed en bloed
vir Vryheid en vir reg
Kom burgers! laat die vlae wapper
Ons lyding is verby
Roem in die sege van onse dapp'res
'n Vrye volk is ons!
'n Vrye volk, 'n Vrye volk
'n Vrye, Vrye volk is ons!

Ken jy die land so min bekend
en tog so heerlik skoon
Waar die natuur haar wonders skenk
en kwistig stel ten toon
Transvalers! Laat ons feeslied galm
waar vas ons volk moet staan
waar onse vreugdeskote g'knalt
Daar is ons vaderland!
'n Heerlik land, 'n Heerlik land
Dit is, Dit is ons vaderland!

Ken jy die staat, nog maar 'n kind
in wêrelds statery
maar tog deur magtig Brits bewind
weleer verklaar as vry
Transvalers! edel was ons strewe
en pynlik onse smaad
maar God wat uitkoms het gegewe
sy lof vir eie staat
loof onse God! loof onse God!
loof onse God vir land en staat!

English lyrics

Know ye the folk full of heroism,
And yet so long oppressed?
It hath offered property and blood
For freedom and for righteousness.
Come citizens! Let the flags wave
Our suffering is over;
Praise the victories of our braves:
That free folk are we!
That free folk, that free folk,
That free, free folk are we!

Know ye the land, so seldom sought,
And yet so truly clean;
Where the nature bestows her wonders,
And luxuriantly displays?
Transvaalers! let our anthem ring out!
Where firmly our folk must stand
Where our salutes were fired,
There is our fatherland!
The honest land, the honest land
That is, that is our fatherland!

Know ye the state, still yet a child
In the rank of the world's states,
But yet by mighty British powers
Long ago declared free?
Transvaalers! noble was our strive,
And painful our slander,
But God gave the outcome,
Praise Him for our State!
Praise our God! praise our God!
Praise our God for land and State!

== See also ==
- National anthem of South Africa
- Die Stem van Suid-Afrika
- National anthem of the Orange Free State
- List of national anthems
