= Ishe Komborera Africa =

1980–1994 national anthem of Zimbabwe

English: God Bless Africa
- Former national anthem of Zimbabwe
- Also known as: "Ishe Komborera Zimbabwe"
- Music: Enoch Sontonga, 1897
- Adopted: 18 April 1980
- Relinquished: March 1994
- Preceded by: “Rise, O Voices of Rhodesia” (As national anthem of Rhodesia)
- Succeeded by: "Simudzai Mureza wedu weZimbabwe"

Audio sample
- "Ishe Komborera Africa" (instrumental): file; help

"Ishe Komborera Africa" (Shona for: God Bless Africa), also called "Ishe Komborera Zimbabwe" (Shona for: God Bless Zimbabwe), was the Zimbabwean national anthem from 1980 to 1994. It was the country's first national anthem after gaining independence in 1980. It is a translation of 19th-century South African schoolteacher Enoch Sontonga's popular African hymn "Nkosi Sikelel' iAfrika" into Zimbabwe's native Shona and Ndebele languages.

The song was first translated into Shona in the early 20th century and was initially popular with all sections of society in Southern Rhodesia. Following Rhodesia's Unilateral Declaration of Independence, it was polarised as a symbol of the Zimbabwe liberation movement. It was adopted in 1980 following Zimbabwe's independence as a show of solidarity with other African movements in countries under apartheid. It was replaced as the national anthem of Zimbabwe in 1994 by "Simudzai Mureza wedu weZimbabwe" (Shona for: Raise Our Zimbabwean Flag) as part of a move to adopt a uniquely Zimbabwean composition for use as the national anthem, but it still remains very popular in the country.

== History ==
In the early 20th century, "Nkosi Sikielel' iAfrika" was becoming popular with black Africans. In Southern Rhodesia it was originally sung in the original Xhosa language before being translated into Shona which created "Ishe Komborera Africa". The new Shona language hymn was first performed at the start of a meeting of the Southern Rhodesia Native Association and then again four days later at the closure of the first meeting of the Bantu National Congress, which the Southern Rhodesia Native Association later became affiliated to. By the 1948 African General Strike, it had become the main political song amongst black Africans. Despite that connotation, the song was accepted by black and white Rhodesians. In 1951, at a British South African Police athletics competition, "Ishe Komborera Africa" was sung by combined black and white policemen to commemorate the first multi-racial competition in Southern Rhodesia.

Following Rhodesia's Unilateral Declaration of Independence from the British Empire, the new Rhodesian authorities started to crack down on African liberation movements. One of their considerations was to ban performance of "Ishe Komborera Africa" in African schools and public performance of it often made people liable for arrest by the British South African Police. The District Commissioner for Gutu abolished the Gutu African Council after its leader opened a meeting by singing "Ishe Komborera Africa" in the District Commissioner's presence. The Commissioner also had the leader arrested but he was released without charge. Following the Southern Rhodesian general election, 1980, after Zimbabwe Rhodesia returned to British control as Southern Rhodesia, Robert Mugabe's Zimbabwe African National Union party won to become the first government of an independent Zimbabwe. After this, "Ishe Komborera Africa" was selected to replace the official "God Save the Queen" of Southern Rhodesia and "Rise, O Voices of Rhodesia" of Rhodesia as the national anthem of an independent Zimbabwe as it was a symbol of black African struggles and solidarity against apartheid systems in South Africa and South West Africa. At the Zimbabwean independence ceremony, the Union Jack was lowered to "God Save the Queen" and the new flag of Zimbabwe was raised to "Ishe Komborera Africa" in Salisbury.

== Replacement ==
In 1994, it was deemed that Zimbabwe should change its national anthem to avoid similarities with other countries who used the tune of "Ishe Kombererra Africa". Tanzania used "Mungu ibariki Afrika", Zambia used "Stand and Sing of Zambia, Proud and Free" (to the same tune), also Ciskei and Transkei who used "Nkosi Sikielel' 'Afrika". It was also because Mugabe wanted to develop a new distinctly Zimbabwean identity with a unique national anthem. A contest was held to determine a new national anthem and "Simudzai Mureza wedu weZimbabwe" by Solomon Mutswairo was chosen. The new anthem was promoted prior to "Ishe Komborera Africa" being replaced as the official national anthem. However, there was scepticism from Christians about the need for replacing "Ishe Komborera Africa" with the belief that it was part of a plan by ZANU-PF to remove references to God from Zimbabwe's official proceedings.

The change of anthem from "Ishe Komberera Africa" was later confirmed by the Parliament of Zimbabwe in 1995 by the passage of the National Anthem of Zimbabwe Act. The act also made it a criminal offence to insult the new national anthem and also granted the President of Zimbabwe the right to make regulations controlling its use and how it was to be sung.

== Legacy ==
Despite being replaced as the Zimbabwe national anthem, "Ishe Komborera Africa" is still popular in Zimbabwe. It is still used as a hymn within Zimbabwean churches. In 1997, following the Convention on International Trade in Endangered Species (CITES) voting in favour of a motion that African elephants were not endangered in some countries and thus their ivory could be exported from those countries, representatives of the African nations celebrated by singing "Ishe Komborera Africa" while conservationists cried.

"Ishe Komborera Africa" has also erroneously been played as the Zimbabwean national anthem instead of "Simudzai Mureza wedu weZimbabwe" since losing its status as Zimbabwe's national anthem. In 2004, at the Africa Cup of Nations in Tunisia, before the Zimbabwe national football team's match against Egypt, "Ishe Komborera Africa" was played instead of "Simudzai Mureza wedu weZimbabwe". In response, the Zimbabwean Information Minister, Jonathan Moyo accused it of being "a cheap attempt by the organisers to demoralise our boys". Later in the year, the same situation occurred at the African Athletics Championships in the Republic of the Congo when the Zimbabwean men's relay team won gold. The Zimbabwean team insisted the correct national anthem be played; however, as the band were unable to perform it, Lloyd Zvasiya sang it himself through a microphone.

== Shona lyrics ==
Ishe komborera Africa
Ngaisimudzirwe zita rayo
Inzwai miteuro yedu
Ishe komborera,
Isu, mhuri yayo.
Huya mweya
Huya mweya komborera
(repeat previous two lines)
Huya mweya
Huya mweya mutsvene
Uti komborere
Isu mhuri yayo.

== Ndebele lyrics ==
Nkosi sikelel' iAfrica
Maluphakanyisw' udumo lwayo
Yizwa imithandazo yethu
Nkosi sikelela,
Thina, usapho lwayo.
Woza Moya
Woza Moya sikelela
(repeat previous two lines)
Woza Moya
Woza Moya oyingcwele
Usi sikelele
Thina usapho lwayo.

== English lyrics ==
God bless Africa,
Let her fame spread far and wide!
Hear our prayer,
May God bless us!
Come, Spirit, come!
Come! Holy Spirit!
Come and bless us, her children!
