= Die Stem van Suid-Afrika =

South African anthem from 1938 to 1994

English: "The Call of South Africa"
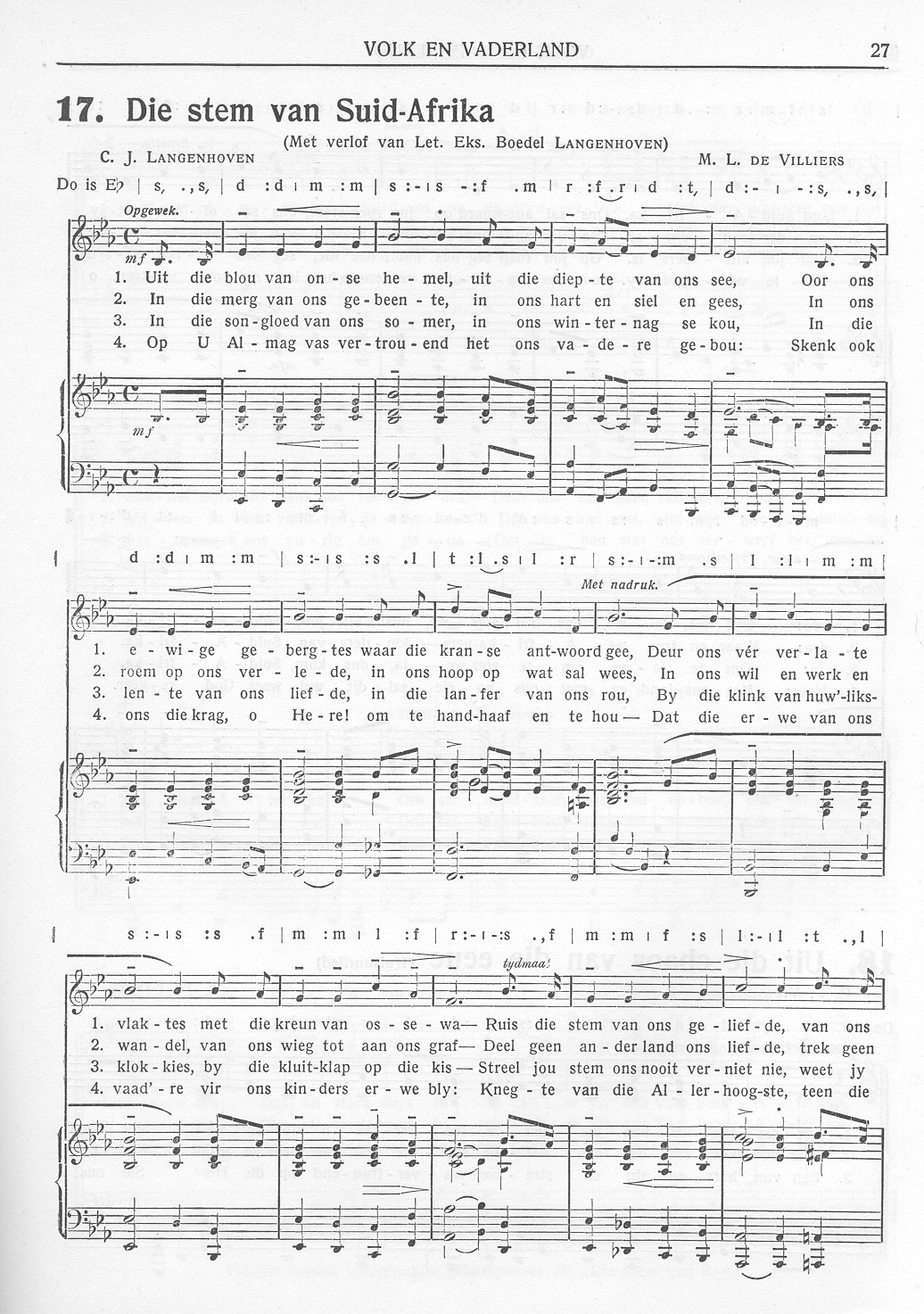
- Excerpt of "Die Stem" from the F.A.K.-Volksangbundel
- Former national anthem of South Africa
- Also known as: "Die Stem" (English: "The Voice")
- Lyrics: Cornelis Jacobus Langenhoven, 1918 (English version: Collectively, 1952)
- Music: Marthinus Lourens de Villiers, 1921
- Published: 1926
- Adopted: 3 June 1938 (jointly with "God Save the King/Queen"); 2 May 1957 (as the sole national anthem); 10 May 1994 (jointly with "Nkosi Sikelel' iAfrika")
- Relinquished: 10 May 1994 (as the sole national anthem); 10 October 1997 (as the co-national anthem)
- Preceded by: "God Save the Queen"
- Succeeded by: "National anthem of South Africa"

Audio sample
- "Die Stem van Suid-Afrika" (instrumental, mid-20th century recording): file; help

Die Stem van Suid-Afrika (Afrikaans: [di ˈstɛm fan sœyt ˈɑːfrika], lit. 'The Voice of South Africa'), also known as "The Call of South Africa" or simply "Die Stem" (Afrikaans: [di ˈstɛm]), was the national anthem of South Africa. There are two versions of the song, one in English and the other in Afrikaans, which were in use early on in the Union of South Africa alongside God Save the Queen and as the sole anthem after South Africa became a republic. It was the sole national anthem from 1957 to 1994, and shared co-national anthem status with "God Save the King/Queen" from 1938 to 1957. After 1994, it was retained as a co-national anthem along with "Nkosi Sikelel' iAfrika" until 1997, when a new hybrid song incorporating elements of both songs was adopted as the country's new national anthem, which is still in use.

== History ==
A 1938 recording of "Die Stem van Suid-Afrika" being performed by the ASAF Choir, featuring the first and last verses.

Mid-20th century recording of "Die Stem van Suid-Afrika" being performed by the South African Air Force Band.

"Die Stem van Suid-Afrika"'s all four stanzas sung by a choir in the mid-20th century

"The Call of South Africa" all four stanzas sung by a choir in the mid-20th century in English

"Die Stem van Suid-Afrika" performed by the Royal Australian Air Force Central Band in 1957, directed by Laurence Henry Hicks.

"Die Stem van Suid-Afrika" performed by a US military band in 1994 as part of an official state visit by South African president Nelson Mandela to the US capital of Washington, DC.

=== Background and inception ===
In May 1918, C.J. Langenhoven wrote an Afrikaans poem called "Die Stem", for which music was composed in 1921 by Marthinus Lourens de Villiers, a reverend. The music composed that ended up being accepted was actually a second version; the first did not satisfy Langenhoven. It was widely used by the South African Broadcasting Corporation in the 1920s, which played it at the close of daily broadcasts, along with "God Save The King". It was recorded for the first time in 1926 when its first and third verses were performed by Betty Steyn in England for the Zonophone record label; it was sung publicly for the first time on 31 May 1928 at a raising of the new South African national flag. In 1938, South Africa proclaimed it to be one of the two co-national anthems of the country, along with "God Save the King".

It was sung in English as well as Afrikaans from 1952 onward, with both versions having official status in the eyes of the state, while "God Save the Queen" did not cease to be a co-national anthem until May 1957, when it was dropped from that role. However, it remained the country's royal anthem until 1961, as it was a Commonwealth realm until that point. The poem originally had only three verses, but the government asked the author to add a fourth verse with a religious theme. The English version is for the most part a faithful translation of the Afrikaans version with a few minor changes.

=== Composition ===
It is uplifting in tone, addressing throughout of commitment to the Vaderland (English: Fatherland) and to God. However, it was generally disliked by black South Africans, who saw it as triumphalist and strongly associated it with the apartheid regime where one verse shows dedication to Afrikaners (though the specific mention of Afrikaners is omitted in the English version to avoid alienating the British-descent Anglophone whites living in South Africa as they are not considered Afrikaners) and another to the Great Trek of the Voortrekkers. P. W. Botha, who was the state president of South Africa during the 1980s, was fond of the song and made his entourage sing it when they visited Switzerland during his presidency.

=== Decline ===
As the dismantling of apartheid began in the early 1990s, South African teams were readmitted to international sporting events, which presented a problem as to the choice of anthem for South Africa. Agreements were made with the African National Congress (ANC) that "Die Stem van Suid-Afrika" would not be sung at rugby matches, due to its connection to the apartheid system and minority rule (which led the ANC and other such groups at the time to view the song as offensive). However, at a rugby union test match against New Zealand in 1992, the crowd spontaneously sang "Die Stem" during a moment of silence for victims of political violence in South Africa, and although it was ostensibly agreed upon beforehand that it would not be played, an instrumental recording of "Die Stem" was played over the stadium's PA system's loudspeakers after the New Zealand national anthem was performed, and spectators sang along, sparking controversy afterwards.

Although it remained the official national anthem of the state during this time period, both the usage of it and the then-national flag began to dwindle whenever possible, particularly overseas. For example, at the 1992 Summer Olympics in Barcelona that year, Schiller's "Ode to Joy", as set to Beethoven's music, was used instead of it, along with a neutral Olympic-style flag instead of the South African flag at the time.

"Die Stem van Suid-Afrika"'s future seemed in doubt as the country prepared to transition to majority rule, with many predicting that it would not remain after the transition into the new democratic dispensation. In 1993, a commission sought out a new national anthem for South Africa, with 119 entries being suggested, but none were chosen. Instead, it was decided to retain "Die Stem"'s official status after the advent of full multi-racial democracy which followed the 1994 general election. When the old South African flag was lowered for the last time at the parliament building in Cape Town, "Die Stem" was performed in Afrikaans and then in English as the new South African flag was raised. After 1994, it shared equal status with "Nkosi Sikelel' iAfrika", which had long been a traditional hymn used by the ANC. In 1995, "Die Stem van Suid-Afrika" was sung by a black choir at the Rugby World Cup final match, as it had been done at the 1994 South African presidential inauguration in Pretoria, first in Afrikaans and then in English.

=== Consolidation ===
The practice of singing two different national anthems had been a cumbersome arrangement during the transition to post-apartheid South Africa. On most occasions, it was usually the first verse of "Die Stem van Suid-Afrika" that was sung at ceremonies, in both official languages prior to 1994, with some English medium schools in what was then Natal Province singing the first verse in Afrikaans and the second in English. During this period of two national anthems, the custom was to play both "Die Stem" and "Nkosi Sikelel' iAfrika" during occasions that required the playing of a national anthem. However, this proved cumbersome as performing the dual national anthems took as much as five minutes to conclude. In 1997, with the adoption of a new national constitution, a new composite national anthem was introduced, which combined part of "Nkosi Sikelel 'iAfrika" and part of "Die Stem van Suid-Afrika" into a single composition in order to form a new hybrid song.

=== Legacy ===
Since the end of apartheid and the adoption of a new national anthem in the 1990s, the status of "Die Stem" has become somewhat controversial in contemporary South Africa, due to its connection with the apartheid regime and white minority rule.

Although elements of it are used in the current South African national anthem, in recent years some South Africans have called for those segments to be removed due to their connection with apartheid, whereas others defend the inclusion of it, as it was done for post-apartheid re-conciliatory reasons. When "Die Stem" was mistakenly played by event organisers in place of the current South African national anthem during a UK-hosted women's field hockey match in 2012, it sparked outrage and confusion among the South African staff members and players present.

The Afrikaans version remains popular with Afrikaner nationalists and far-right organisations such as the Afrikaner Weerstandsbeweging, where it is sometimes performed at the funerals of such groups' members or at demonstrations by them. Die Stem was also the name of a far-right periodical during the apartheid era.

== Lyrics ==
Die Stem van Suid-Afrika/The Call of South Africa
"Die Stem van Suid-Afrika"
"The Call of South Africa"
Literal translation of "Die Stem van Suid-Afrika"
First verse

Uit die blou van onse hemel,
Uit die diepte van ons see,
Oor ons ewige gebergtes
Waar die kranse antwoord gee,
Deur ons ver-verlate vlaktes
Met die kreun van ossewa –
Ruis die stem van ons geliefde,
Van ons land Suid-Afrika.
Ons sal antwoord op jou roepstem,
Ons sal offer wat jy vra:
Ons sal lewe, ons sal sterwe –
Ons vir jou, Suid-Afrika.

Ringing out from our blue heavens,
From our deep seas breaking round;
Over everlasting mountains,
Where the echoing crags resound;
From our plains where creaking wagons
Cut their trails into the earth,
Calls the spirit of our country,
Of the land that gave us birth.
At thy call we shall not falter,
Firm and steadfast we shall stand,
At thy will to live or perish,
O South Africa, dear land.

From the blue of our heavens
From the depths of our sea,
Over our eternal mountain ranges
Where the cliffs give an echo.
Through our far-deserted plains
With the groan of ox-wagon –
Rises the voice of our beloved,
Of our country South Africa.
We will answer to your calling,
We will offer what you ask:
We will live, we will die –
We for Thee, South Africa.

Second verse

In die merg van ons gebeente,
In ons hart en siel en gees,
In ons roem op ons verlede,
In ons hoop op wat sal wees,
In ons wil en werk en wandel,
Van ons wieg tot aan ons graf –
Dee! geen ander land ons Iiefde,
Trek geen ander trou ons af.
Vaderland! Ons sal die adel
Van jou naam met ere dra:
Waar en trou as Afrikaners –
Kinders van Suid-Afrika.

In our body and our spirit,
In our inmost heart held fast;
In the promise of our future,
And the glory of our past;
In our will, our work, our striving,
From the cradle to the grave –
There's no land that shares our loving,
And no bond that can enslave.
Thou hast borne us and we know thee,
May our deeds to all proclaim
Our enduring love and service
To thy honour and thy name.

In the marrow of our bones,
In our heart and soul and spirit,
In the glory of our past,
In our hope of what will be.
In our will and work and wander,
From our crib to our grave –
Share no other land our love,
No other loyalty can sway us.
Fatherland! We will bear the nobility,
Of your name with honour:
Dedicated and true as Afrikaners –
Children of South Africa.

Third verse

In die songloed van ons somer,
In ons winternag se kou,
In die lente van ons liefde,
In die Ianfer van ons rou,
By die klink van huw'liks-klokkies,
By die kluitklap op die kis –
Streel jou stem ons nooit verniet nie,
Weet jy waar jou kinders is.
Op jou roep se ons nooit nee nie,
Se ons altyd, altyd ja:
Om te lewe, om te sterwe –
Ja, ons kom, Suid-Afrika.

In the golden warmth of summer,
In the chill of winter's air,
In the surging life of springtime,
In the autumn of despair;
When the wedding bells are chiming
Or when those we love do depart,
Thou dost know us for thy children
And dost take us to thy heart
Loudly peals the answering chorus:
We are thine, and we shall stand,
Be it life or death, to answer
To thy call, beloved land.

In the sunglow of our summer,
In our winter night's cold,
In the spring of our love,
In the autumn of our sorrow.
At the sound of wedding bells,
At the stonefall on the coffin –
Soothes your voice us never in vain,
You know where your children are.
At your call we never say no,
We always, always say yes:
To live, to die –
Yes, we come, South Africa.

Fourth verse

Op U Almag vas vertrouend
Het ons vadere gebou:
Skenk ook ons die krag, o Here!
Om te handhaaf en te hou -
Dat die erwe van ons vaad're
Vir ons kinders erwe bly:
Knegte van die Allerhoogste,
Teen die hele wereld vry.
Soos ons vadere vertrou het,
Leer ook ons vertrou, o Heer –
Met ons land en met ons nasie
Sal dit wei wees, God regeer.

In thy power, Almighty, trusting,
Did our fathers build of old;
Strengthen then, O Lord, their children
To defend, to love, to hold –
That the heritage they gave us
For our children yet may be:
Bondsmen only to the Highest (Note: Sometimes given as: "Bondsmen only of the Highest".)
And before the whole world free.
As our fathers trusted humbly,
Teach us, Lord to trust Thee still:
Guard our land and guide our people
In Thy way to do Thy will.

On your almight steadfast entrusted
Had our fathers built:
Give to us also the strength, o Lord!
To sustain and to preserve –
That the heritage of our fathers
For our children heritage remain:
Servants of the almighty,
Against the whole world free.
As our fathers trusted,
Teach us also to trust, o Lord –
With our land and with our nation
It will be well, God reigns.

== See also ==
- List of historical national anthems
- National anthem of South Africa
- National anthem of the Orange Free State
- National anthem of the Transvaal
- Flag of South Africa (1928–1994)
