= Stand and Sing of Zambia, Proud and Free =

National anthem of Zambia

- National anthem of Zambia
- Lyrics: G. Ellis, E.S. Musonda, J.M.S. Lichilana, I. Lowe, J. Sajiwandani, and R.J. Seal, 1973
- Music: Enoch Sontonga, 1897
- Adopted: 14 September 1973; 52 years ago
- Preceded by: "Nkosi Sikelel' iAfrika"

Audio sample
- Instrumental version: file; help

"Stand and Sing of Zambia, Proud and Free" is the national anthem of Zambia. The tune is taken from the hymn "Nkosi Sikelel' iAfrika" (English: "Lord Bless Africa"), which was composed by Xhosa composer Enoch Sontonga, in 1897. The lyrics were composed after Zambian independence to specifically reflect Zambia, as opposed to Sontonga's lyrics, which refer to Africa as a whole.

== History ==
"Nkosi Sikelel' iAfrika" started to become popular in South Africa in 1923 as a Christian hymn. It became a closing hymn for African National Congress (ANC) meetings and later became a symbolic song for black struggle against the Apartheid regime. Its popularity spread across Africa through churches, and the tune became associated with African nationalism movements across the continent, particularly in East and Southern Africa. Following the passing of the Zambia Independence Act 1964 in the Parliament of the United Kingdom, enacting Zambia's independence from the United Kingdom, "Nkosi Sikelel' iAfrika" was adopted as the national anthem of Zambia, replacing "God Save the Queen", the anthem of Northern Rhodesia. In 1973, having used "Nkosi Sikeleli Africa" for over 9 years, it was decided that new lyrics set to the tune of "Nkosi Sikelel' iAfrika" would be needed for Zambia's national anthem. A national competition was held for the new words. However, none of the entries were deemed good enough to be used in full for the anthem. As a result, six of the entries were merged to create "Stand and Sing of Zambia, Proud and Free", and the entrants selected were awarded prizes. The authors credited for the composition were G. Ellis, E.S. Musonda, J.M.S. Lichilana, I. Lowe, J. Sajiwandani and R.J. Seal.

In September 1973, the National Assembly passed the National Anthem Act, which legally defined the English lyrics of "Stand and Sing of Zambia, Proud and Free" as the national anthem of Zambia. The Act also made it an offence to "insult or bring into contempt or ridicule" the anthem and granted the President of Zambia the rights to prescribe how the anthem is sung and to restrict its use.

== Lyrics ==
On occasions requiring brevity, usually the first verse and chorus are sung.

English lyrics (official)

I
Stand and sing of Zambia, proud and free,
Land of work and joy in unity,
Victors in the struggle for the right,
We've won freedom's fight.
All one, strong and free.

II
Africa is our own motherland,
Fashion'd with and blessed by God's good hand,
Let us all her people join as one,
Brothers under the sun.
All one, strong and free.

III
One land and one nation is our cry,
Dignity and peace 'neath Zambia's sky,
Like our noble eagle in its flight,
Zambia, praise to thee.
All one, strong and free.

Chorus:
Praise be to God,
Praise be, praise be, praise be,
Bless our great nation,
Zambia, Zambia, Zambia.
Free men we stand
Under the flag of our land.
Zambia, praise to thee!
All one, strong and free.

Bemba lyrics

I
Lumbanyeni Zambia, no kwanga,
Ne cilumba twange tuumfwane,
Mpalume sha bulwi bwa cine,
Twaliilubula.
Twikatane bonse.

II
Bonse tuli bana ba Afrika,
Uwasenaminwa na Lesa,
Nomba bonse twendele pamo,
Twaliilubula.
Twikatane bonse.

III
Fwe lukuta lwa Zambia lonse,
Twikatane tubyo mutende,
Pamo nga lubambe mu mulu,
Lumbanyeni Zambia.
Twikatane bonse.

Chorus:
Lumbanyeni,
Lesa, Lesa, wesu,
Apale calo,
Zambia, Zambia, Zambia.
Fwe bantungwa
Mu luunga lwa calo.
Lumbanyeni Zambia.
Twikatane bonse.

Chewa lyrics

I
Imani timtamande Zambia,
Dziko la cimwemwe ndi umodzi,
Ife tinamenyera ufulu,
Tinapata ufuluwu,
Umodzi ndi mphamvu.

II
Afirika ndiye Mayi wathu,
Dzanja la Mbuye lamdalitsa
Tiyeni tonse tigwirizane
Ndife abale m'dziko:
Umodzi ndi mphamvu.

III
Dziko limodzi, mtundu umodzi
Ndi cilakolako cathutu
Ulemu ndi mtendere m'dziko
Monga nkwazi m'mwamba:
Umodzi ndi mphamvu.

Chorus:
Timtamande,
Mlungu, Mlungu wathu,
Adalitse,
Zambia, Zambia, Zambia.
Omasuka pansi
Pa ndembela yathu.
Zambia timtamande.
Umodzi ndi mphamvu.

Tonga lyrics

I
Atumutembaule Zambia,
mbotubelekela antoomwe,
Twakazunda akwaanguluka,
Akulilela,
Toonse Tuswangane.

II
Afrika mbabaama besu,
Cisi cakalelekw' aLeza,
Toonse tobantu tuswaangane,
Mubwanabokwabo,
Toonse Tuswangane.

III
Ciinga comwe ncotulilila,
Mbulemu aluumuno mucisi,
Mbuli Sikwaze Mbwauluka,
Zambia, omubotu,
Toonse Tuswangane.

Chorus:
Atulumbe,
Leza Leza Wesu
Cisi Cesu,
Zambia, Zambia, Zambia,
Andembela,
yuunga mucisi cesu,
Zambia Omubotu,
Toonse Tuswangane.

Luvale lyrics

I
Twimbenu nakwalisa Zambia
Tuzachile hamwe nagolo
Tunalu Makva osena
Tuzachile hamwe
tuli nunge mwose

II
Africa hilifuchi lyetu
vatuhana kuli kalunga
ngekweze mwata lemba mwilu
tuli nunge vose
tuzachile hamwe

III
Kuwunda chiyengili lenga
mumiyachi yose mu Zambia
Twivwa sanenu tuvosena
tuzachile hamwe
tuli nunge mwose

Chorus:
Lemesenu...
Tengi...tengi..yetu
natuhane....
Zambia ,Zambia...Zambia
Twasokoka,twemanana,lipandelo
tulinunge vose
tuzachile hamwe.

=== Criticism ===
In 2005, Zambian women's groups petitioned for a number of the lyrics in "Stand and Sing of Zambia, Proud and Free" to be changed, because they felt that they were too male orientated. In response, it was decreed that the current lyrics did include women in context, and it was stated that "Stand and Sing of Zambia, Proud and Free" was "composed of historical lyrics that reflect the country's heritage and pride."

In 2012, Professor Michelo Hansungule repeated the concerns that the Zambian national anthem was too masculine. He also argued that because it had the same tune as the national anthem of South Africa, it might have intellectual property implications and suggested that Zambia's sovereignty could be questioned.

== See also ==
- National anthem of South Africa
