= Enoch Sontonga =

South African Xhosa composer (c. 1873 – 1905)

Enoch Mankayi Sontonga
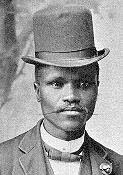

Background information
- Born: 1873; Uitenhage, Cape Colony
- Died: 18 April 1905 (aged 32) Johannesburg, Transvaal Colony
- Occupations: Music composer, Teacher, Choirmaster, Poet

Enoch Mankayi Sontonga (c. 1873 – 18 April 1905) was a South African composer, who is best known for writing the Xhosa hymn "Nkosi Sikelel' iAfrika" ("God Bless Africa"), which, in abbreviated version, has been sung as the first half of the national anthem of South Africa since 1994. Previously, it had been the official anthem of the African National Congress since 1925. This song was first adopted by Tanganyika as the national anthem, as a translated Swahili version, in 1961 following independence from Great Britain. In 1964, Zambia also adopted it as its national anthem, followed by Botswana and Zimbabwe (who translated into Shona, "Ishe Komborera Afrika") from 1980 until 1994. South Africa adopted it as its national anthem in 1994.

== Early life and education ==
Sontonga, a Xhosa, was born in the city of Uitenhage in the Eastern Cape Colony. He trained as a teacher at the Lovedale Institution and subsequently worked as a teacher and choirmaster at the Methodist Mission school in Nancefield, near Johannesburg for eight years.

== Career ==
The first verse and chorus of "Nkosi Sikelel' iAfrika" was composed in 1897 and it was originally intended to be a school anthem. Some sources say he wrote the tune the same year. It was first sung in public in 1899 at the ordination of Reverend Mboweni, who was the first Tsonga Methodist minister. Later, the Xhosa poet Samuel Mqhayi wrote a further seven verses.

Sontonga died on 18 April 1905 of gastroenteritis and a perforated appendix, a common cause of death at the time due to unsafe drinking water.

== Personal life ==
Sontonga married Diana Mgqibisa, the daughter of a minister in the African Methodist Episcopal Church, and they had a son. Mgqibisa died in 1939.

== Legacy ==
The song started to be more well known after John Langalibalele Dube's Ohlange Institute's choir used it. They played it at the South African Native National Congress meeting in 1912. It was sung after the closing prayer and the ANC adopted it as its official closing anthem in 1925. It was recorded in London as "Nkosi sikelel' iAfrika" in 1923 and it was published by the Lovedale Press in 1927.

For many years, the site of Sontonga's grave was unknown, but it was finally located in the "Native Christian" section of the Braamfontein cemetery in the early-1990s. One of the reasons why the location of his grave remained a mystery is that it was listed under the name "Enoch" and not by his surname "Sontonga".

On 24 September 1996, Sontonga's grave was declared a national monument and a memorial on the site was unveiled by then-President Nelson Mandela. At the same ceremony, the South African Order of Meritorious Service (Gold) was bestowed on Enoch Sontonga posthumously.

== See also ==
- Sol Plaatje
