= Mungu ibariki Afrika =

National anthem of Tanzania

English: God Bless Africa
- National anthem of Tanzania
- Also known as: Mungu ibariki Tanzania (English: God Bless Tanzania)
- Lyrics: Collectively
- Music: Enoch Sontonga, 1897
- Adopted: 1961; 65 years ago

Audio sample
- U.S. Navy Band instrumental version (one verse): file; help

"Mungu ibariki Afrika" (English: "God bless Africa") is the national anthem of Tanzania. It is a Swahili language version of Enoch Sontonga's Xhosa language hymn "Nkosi Sikelel' iAfrika".

== Etymology ==
The word Mungu in Swahili means God and its title, therefore, translates as "God bless Africa".

== History ==
"Mungu ibariki Afrika" was translated and became the state anthem of Tanganyika. It was essentially assigned to Enoch Sontonga, who died in 1905. "Mungu ibariki Afrika" used the tune to "Nkosi Sikelel' iAfrika" with a Swahili translation of the words. It is not known who composed the lyrics, but it is known that it was Samuel Mqhayi and Enoch Sontonga who created the early versions used by the African National Congress.

=== Swahili translation ===
It was first performed in Swahili at a ceremony on 8 December 1961 following the independence of Tanganyika from the British Empire. "Mungu ibariki Afrika" was composed to replace the British national anthem, "God Save the Queen", as the national anthem of Tanganyika. This made Tanganyika the first African nation to adopt the tune of "Nkosi Sikelel' iAfrika" as its national anthem. In 1964, Tanganyika formed a union with Zanzibar, which created the United Republic of Tanganyika and Zanzibar (later renamed to Tanzania). The newly united country adopted "Mungu ibariki Afrika" as its national anthem instead of Zanzibar's anthem. Tanzania's use of "Mungu ibariki Afrika" led the way for other African countries such as Zimbabwe; Ciskei and Transkei adopted "Nkosi Sikelel' Afrika", in parts, as their national anthems. South Africa, where the song comes from, uses only some of the words, Zambia uses only the tune and other countries have now abandoned its use. "Mungu ibariki Afrika" was inspired by the African National Congress's (ANC) use of "Nkosi Sikelel' iAfrika" ("God Bless Africa") as its party song after its use at Ohlange High School. The ANC party anthem led to "Mungu ibariki Afrika" being selected as the national anthem of Tanzania. "Mungu ibariki Afrika" is also used as a hymn requesting Tanzania remain united and independent.

Tanganyika, and later Tanzania, had concerns about religious unrest between Christians and Muslims after independence. This was because of Christian references in government proceedings and official oaths. The wording of "Mungu ibariki Afrika" was intended to help offset this by being inclusive of the different religious views.

"Mungu ibariki Afrika" is sung daily at Tanzanian schools. A circular issued in 1998 by the nation's Commissioner of Education recommended the singing of the national anthem as a way to promote patriotism in Tanzania's youth.

In 2007, a legal issue arose over the anthem, after students who were members of the Jehovah's Witnesses refused to sing the song at their primary and secondary schools in Mbozi District, Mbeya Region. Five students were expelled from school, and 122 others received other forms of discipline for their refusal. They objected to singing the anthem because they believed it suggested obeisance to the flag of Tanzania before God. On 2 December 2010, the High Court of Tanzania ruled that the schools' disciplinary actions were appropriate. The Court of Appeal of Tanzania overturned that ruling on 12 July 2013, indicating that the disciplinary action taken by the school was unlawful and stating that there was no obligation to sing the national anthem in Tanzanian law.

== Lyrics ==
Swahili lyrics

I
Mungu ibariki Afrika
Wabariki Viongozi wake
Hekima Umoja na Amani
Hizi ni ngao zetu
Afrika na watu wake.

Kiitikio ya kwanza:
Ibariki Afrika, Ibariki Afrika
Tubariki watoto wa Afrika.

II
Mungu ibariki Tanzania
Dumisha uhuru na Umoja
Wake kwa Waume na Watoto
Mungu Ibariki
Tanzania na watu wake.

Kiitikio ya pili:
Ibariki Tanzania, Ibariki Tanzania
Tubariki watoto wa Tanzania.

IPA transcription (Note: See Help:IPA/Swahili and Swahili language § Phonology.)

1
[mu.ᵑɡu i.ɓɑ.ri.ki ɑ.fri.kɑ]
[wɑ.ɓɑ.ri.ki vi.ɔ.ᵑɡɔ.zi wɑ.kɛ]
[hɛ.ki.mɑ u.mɔ.ʄɑ nɑ ɑ.mɑ.ni]
[hi.zi ni ᵑɡɑ.ɔ zɛ.tu]
[ɑ.fri.kɑ nɑ wɑ.tu wɑ.kɛ]

[kiː.ti.ki.ɔ jɑ kwɑ.ⁿzɑ]
[i.ɓɑ.ri.ki ɑ.fri.kɑ i.ɓɑ.ri.ki ɑ.fri.kɑ]
[tu.ɓɑ.ri.ki wɑ.tɔ.tɔ wɑ ɑ.fri.kɑ]

2
[mu.ᵑɡu i.ɓɑ.ri.ki tɑ.ⁿzɑ.ni.ɑ]
[ɗu.mi.ʃɑ u.hu.ru nɑ u.mɔ.ʄɑ]
[wɑ.kɛ kwɑ wɑ.u.mɛ nɑ wɑ.tɔ.tɔ]
[mu.ᵑɡu i.ɓɑ.ri.ki]
[tɑ.ⁿzɑ.ni.ɑ nɑ wɑ.tu wɑ.kɛ]

[kiː.ti.ki.ɔ jɑ pi.li]
[i.ɓɑ.ri.ki tɑ.ⁿzɑ.ni.ɑ i.ɓɑ.ri.ki tɑ.ⁿzɑ.ni.ɑ]
[tu.ɓɑ.ri.ki wɑ.tɔ.tɔ wɑ tɑ.ⁿzɑ.ni.ɑ]

English translation

I
God bless Africa
Bless its leaders
Wisdom, unity and peace
These are our shields
Africa and its people

Chorus I:
Bless Africa, Bless Africa
Bless us, the children of Africa

II
God bless Tanzania
Grant eternal freedom and unity
To its women, men and children
God bless
Tanzania and its people

Chorus II:
Bless Tanzania, Bless Tanzania
Bless us, the children of Tanzania
