= Nkosi Sikelel' iAfrika =

Hymn composed in 1897 by Enoch Sontonga

English: Lord Bless Africa
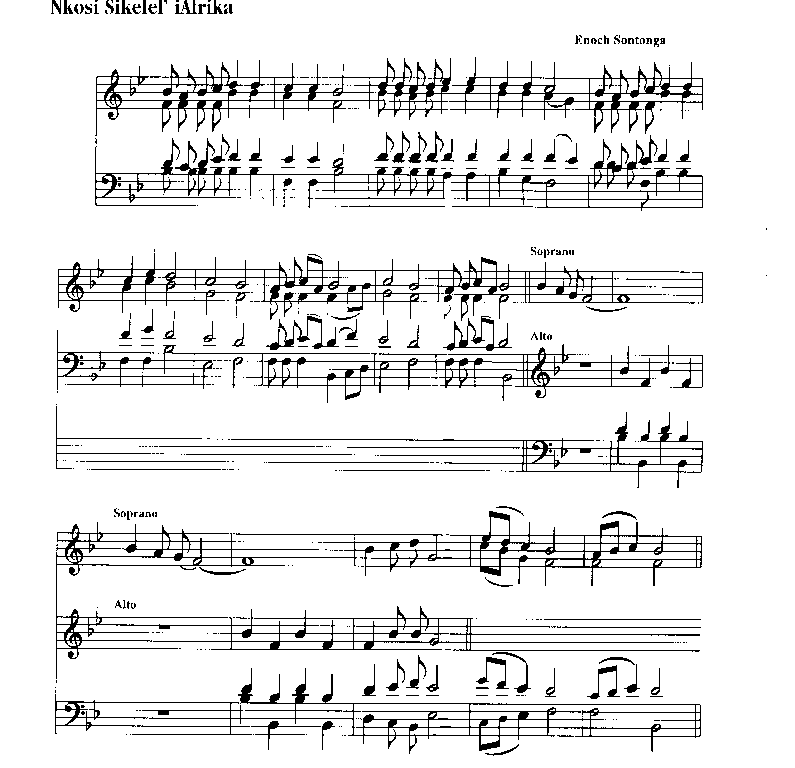
- Former co-national anthem of South Africa Former national anthem of Zimbabwe, Namibia and Zambia
- Lyrics: Enoch Sontonga, 1897
- Music: Enoch Sontonga, 1897
- Adopted: 10 May 1994 (by South Africa); 21 March 1990 (by Namibia); 24 October 1964 (by Zambia)
- Relinquished: 10 October 1997 (by South Africa); 17 December 1991 (by Namibia); 14 September 1973 (by Zambia)
- Preceded by: "Die Stem van Suid-Afrika" (South Africa & Namibia) "God Save the Queen" (Zambia & Zimbabwe)
- Succeeded by: "National anthem of South Africa" (South Africa) "Namibia, Land of the Brave" (Namibia) "Stand and Sing of Zambia, Proud and Free" (Zambia) "Simudzai Mureza wedu weZimbabwe" (Zimbabwe)

Audio sample
- "Nkosi Sikelel' iAfrika" (instrumental): file; help

"Nkosi Sikelel' iAfrika" (Xhosa pronunciation: [ŋkʼɔsi sikʼɛlɛl‿iafrikʼa], lit. 'Lord Bless Africa') is a Christian hymn composed in 1897 by Enoch Sontonga, a Xhosa clergyman at a Methodist mission school near Johannesburg.

The song became a pan-African liberation song and versions of it were later adopted as the national anthems of five countries in Africa including Zambia, Tanzania, Namibia and Zimbabwe after independence, and South Africa after the end of apartheid. The song's melody is still used as the national anthem of Tanzania and the national anthem of Zambia (Zimbabwe and Namibia have since changed to new anthems with other melodies).

In 1994, Nelson Mandela decreed that the verse of "Nkosi Sikelel' iAfrika" be embraced as a joint national anthem of South Africa; a revised version additionally including elements of "Die Stem" (the then co-state anthem inherited from the previous apartheid government) was adopted in 1997. This new South African national anthem is sometimes referred to as "Nkosi Sikelel' iAfrika" although it is not its official name.

The hymn is also often considered the unofficial African "national" anthem. According to anthropologist David Coplan: " "Nkosi Sikelel' iAfrika" has come to symbolize more than any other piece of expressive culture the struggle for African unity and liberation in South Africa."

== History ==
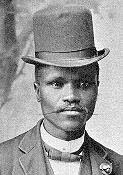
Enoch Sontonga, Composer of Nkosi Sikelel' iAfrika

Sung by Sol Plaatje in 1923

Hummed rendition of "Nkosi Sikelel' iAfrika"

"Nkosi Sikelel' iAfrika", then the national anthem of South Africa, played by a US military band in 1994 as part of an official state visit by South African president Nelson Mandela to Washington, DC.

"Nkosi Sikelel' iAfrika" was composed in 1897 by Enoch Sontonga, a teacher at a Methodist mission school near Johannesburg. It consisted of a single stanza in Xhosa and was intended to be sung as a hymn. Written in B-flat major, it had a four-part harmony supporting a repetitive melody characteristic of "both Western hymn composition and indigenous South African melodies." It was first publicly sung at the ordination of John Hlengani Mboweni as a pastor in 1899. Rev. Mboweni made first translation to Xitsonga in the same year. In 1927 seven additional Xhosa stanzas were added by the poet Samuel Mqhayi. The hymn was taken up by the choir of Ohlange High School, whose co-founder served as the first president of the South African Native National Congress. It was sung to close the Congress meeting in 1912, and by 1925 it had become the official closing anthem of the organisation, now known as the African National Congress. "Nkosi Sikelel' iAfrika" was first published in 1927. The song was the official anthem for the African National Congress during the apartheid era and was a symbol of the anti-apartheid movement. For decades during the apartheid regime it was considered by many to be the unofficial national anthem of South Africa, representing the suffering of the oppressed masses. Because of its connection to the ANC, the song was banned by the regime during the apartheid era.

=== Use today ===
==== South Africa ====
In 1994, after the end of apartheid, the new President of South Africa Nelson Mandela declared that both "Nkosi Sikelel' iAfrika" and the previous national anthem, "Die Stem van Suid-Afrika" (English: "The Call of South Africa") would be national anthems. While the inclusion of "Nkosi Sikelel' iAfrika" celebrated the newfound freedom of most South Africans, the fact that "Die Stem" was also retained even after the fall of apartheid, represented the desire of the new government led by Mandela to respect all races and cultures in an all-inclusive new era dawning upon South Africa. During this period, the custom was to play "Die Stem" together with "Nkosi Sikelel' iAfrika" during occasions that required the playing of a national anthem.

In 1996, a shortened, combined version of the two compositions was released as the new national anthem of South Africa under the constitution of South Africa and was adopted the following year. This version uses several of the official languages of South Africa. The first two lines of the first stanza are sung in Xhosa and the last two in Zulu. The second stanza is sung in Sesotho. The third stanza consists of a verbatim section of the former South African national anthem, "Die Stem van Suid-Afrika", and is sung in Afrikaans. The fourth and final stanza, sung in English, is a modified version of the closing lines of "Die Stem van Suid-Afrika".

The South African National Anthem is often incorrectly called "Nkosi Sikelel' iAfrika" but the correct name is "The National Anthem of South Africa".

==== Tanzania ====
A Swahili translation of "Nkosi Sikelel' iAfrika" with partially modified lyrics has been used as the national anthem of Tanzania under the name of "Mungu ibariki Afrika" since 1961. This makes it the first national anthem to be based on the tune.

The translation was written to replace the British national anthem, "God Save the Queen" and was first officially performed on 8 December 1961, during a celebration of coming independence of Tanganyika from the British Empire. 75,000 people gathered in the newly constructed national stadium in Dar es Salaam on the evening of independence, including first Prime Minister Julius Nyerere, Governor-General Sir Richard Turnbull, and Prince Philip representing Queen Elizabeth. Near midnight, Nyerere and Turnbull walked to a flagpole in the middle of the field and as light were dimmed, the British Union Jack was lowered and "God Save the Queen" played for the final time. Then a spotlight lit the new flag of green, gold and black as it was hoisted and a band played "Mungu ibariki Afrika".

The song was continued to be used as the national anthem after Tanganyika merged with Zanzibar in 1964 to become the modern country of Tanzania.

== Melody only ==
=== Zambia ===
"Nkosi Sikelel' iAfrika" was the national anthem of Zambia from independence in 1964 until 1973, when the melody was retained but the lyrics replaced by "Stand and Sing of Zambia, Proud and Free".

== Former ==
=== Zimbabwe ===
"Ishe Komborera Africa" was the Zimbabwean version of "God Bless Africa" sung in the Shona and Ndebele languages and was its first national anthem, adopted upon independence in 1980. It was replaced in 1994 by "Ngaikomborerwe Nyika yeZimbabwe/Kalibusiswe Ilizwe LeZimbabwe" (English: "Blessed be the land of Zimbabwe").

=== Namibia ===
"Nkosi Sikelel' iAfrika" was used as the national anthem of Namibia at time of the country's independence in March 1990, but replaced in 1991 by "Namibia, Land of the Brave".

== Other countries and organisations ==
In other African countries throughout southern Africa, the song was sung by various independence and other movements. It includes versions in Chichewa (Malawi and Zambia). Outside of Africa, the hymn is perhaps best known as the long-time (since 1925) anthem of the African National Congress (ANC), as a result of the global anti-Apartheid Movement of the 1970s and 1980s, when it was regularly sung at meetings and other events.

In Finland the same melody is used as the children's psalm "Kuule, Isä taivaan, pyyntö tää" (English: "Hear, Heavenly Father"). The hymn has appeared in Virsikirja, the hymnbook of the Evangelical Lutheran Church of Finland, with lyrics by Jaakko Löytty.

== Lyrics ==
=== Historic lyrics ===
The words of the first stanza and chorus were originally written in Xhosa as a hymn. In 1927 seven additional Xhosa stanzas were added by the poet Samuel Mqhayi.

Xhosa

Nkosi, sikelel' iAfrika
Malupakam' upondo lwayo;
Yiva imithandazo yethu

Chorus

Yihla Moya, yihla Moya
Yihla Moya Oyingcwele

Sikelela iNkosi zethu;
Zimkhumbule umDali wazo;
Zimoyike zezimhlonele,
Azisikelele.

Sikelel' amadol' esizwe,
Sikelela kwa nomlisela
Ulithwal' ilizwe ngomonde,
Uwusikilele.

Sikelel' amakosikazi;
Nawo onk'amanenekazi;
Pakamisa wonk'umtinjana
Uwusikilele.

Sikelela abafundisi
Bemvaba zonke zelilizwe;
Ubathwese ngoMoya Wako
Ubasikelele.

Sikelel' ulimo nemfuyo;
Gxotha zonk' iindlala nezifo;
Zalisa ilizwe nempilo
Ulisikelele.

Sikelel' amalinga ethu
Awomanyana nokuzaka,
Awemfundo nemvisiswano
Uwasikele

Nkosi Sikelel, Afrika;
Cima bonk' ubugwenxa bayo
Neziggito, Nezono zayo
Uwasikelele.

English translation

Lord, bless Africa
May her horn rise high up;
Hear Thou our prayers and bless us.

Chorus

Descend O Spirit
Descend, O Holy Spirit

Bless our chiefs;
May they remember their Creator;
Fear Him and revere Him,
That He may bless them.

Bless the public men,
Bless also the youth
That they may carry the land with patience,
and that Thou mayst bless them.

Bless the wives;
And also all young women;
Lift up all the young girls
And bless them.

Bless the ministers
of all the churches of this land;
Endue them with Thy Spirit
And bless them.

Bless agriculture and stock raising;
Banish all famine and diseases;
Fill the land with good health
and bless it.

Bless our efforts of union and self-uplift,
Of education and mutual
understanding
And bless them.

Lord, bless Africa
Blot out all its wickedness
And its transgressions and sins,
And bless us.

=== Contemporary ===
Xhosa

Nkosi sikelel' iAfrika
Maluphakanyisw' uphondo lwayo
Yiva imithandazo yethu
Nkosi Sikelela Nkosi Sikelela

Nkosi sikelel' iAfrika
Maluphakanyisw' uphondo lwayo
Yizwa imithandazo yethu
Nkosi Sikelela
Thina lusapho lwayo.

Chorus

Yihla moya, yihla moya
Yihla moya oyingcwele
Nkosi Sikelela
Thina lusapho lwayo.

(Repeat)

Zulu

Nkosi, sikelel' iAfrika,
Maluphakanyisw' udumo lwayo;
Yizwa imithandazo yethu
Nkosi sikelela, Nkosi sikelela,

Nkosi, sikelel' iAfrika,
Maluphakanyisw' udumo lwayo;
Yizwa imithandazo yethu
Nkosi sikelela,
Nkosi sikelela,

Chorus

Woza Moya (woza, woza),
Woza Moya (woza, woza),
Woza Moya, Oyingcwele.
Usisikelele, Thina lusapho lwayo.

(Repeat)

English

Lord, bless Africa
May her spirit rise high up
Hear thou our prayers
Lord bless us, Lord bless us.

Lord, bless Africa
May her spirit rise high up
Hear thou our prayers
Lord bless us
Your family.

Chorus

Descend, O Spirit
Descend, O Holy Spirit
Lord bless us
Your family.

(Repeat)

=== Meaning and symbolism ===
British musicologist Nicholas Cook states:

"Nkosi Sikelel' iAfrika" has a meaning that emerges from the act of performing it. Like all choral performance, from singing a hymn to chanting at a football match, it involves communal participation and interaction. Everybody has to listen to everyone else and move forward together. It doesn't just symbolize unity, it enacts it ... Through its block-like harmonic construction and regular phrasing, "Nkosi Sikelel' iAfrika" creates a sense of stability and mutual dependence, with no one vocal part predominating over the others ... It lies audibly at the interface between European traditions of 'common-practice' harmony and African traditions of communal singing, which gives it an inclusive quality entirely appropriate to the aspirations of the new South Africa ... Enlisting music's ability to shape personal identity, "Nkosi Sikelel' iAfrika" actively contributes to the construction of the community that is the new South Africa. In this sense, singing it is a political act.

== Recordings ==
Solomon Plaatje, author and founding member of the ANC, was the first to have the song recorded in London, 1923. A Sotho version was published in 1942 by Moses Mphahlele. Rev. John Langalibalele Dube's Ohlange Zulu Choir popularised the hymn at concerts in Johannesburg, and it became a popular church hymn that was also adopted as the anthem at political meetings.

A version by the London Symphony Orchestra under André Previn was featured in the film Cry Freedom (1987).

In Kenya, Mang'u High School uses a translation, Mungu Ibariki Mang'u High, as its school anthem.

It has also been recorded by Paul Simon and Miriam Makeba, Ladysmith Black Mambazo, Boom Shaka, Osibisa, Oliver Mtukudzi (the Shona version that was once the anthem of Zimbabwe) and the Mahotella Queens. Boom Shaka, a prominent South African kwaito group, formed the anthem in kwaito style, a popular South African genre influenced by house music. The interpretation was controversial, and it was viewed by some as a commercial subversion of the anthem; Boom Shaka countered by stating that their version represents liberation and introduces the song to younger listeners.

South African Idols-winner Elvis Blue recorded an Afrikaans translation of the song with Afrikaans singer Coenie de Villiers entitled "Seëngebed" ("Lord's Blessing") on his third studio album Afrikaans.

British a cappella vocal ensemble The King's Singers released a recording of the song, arranged by Neo Muyanga, on their album Finding Harmony.

== See also ==
- "Die Stem van Suid-Afrika", former national anthem of South Africa, used during the Apartheid era
- "Ishe Komborera Africa", former national anthem of Zimbabwe, used during the early 1980s
- "Shosholoza", Southern African folk song, often referred to as an unofficial national anthem of South Africa
