= List of national anthems =

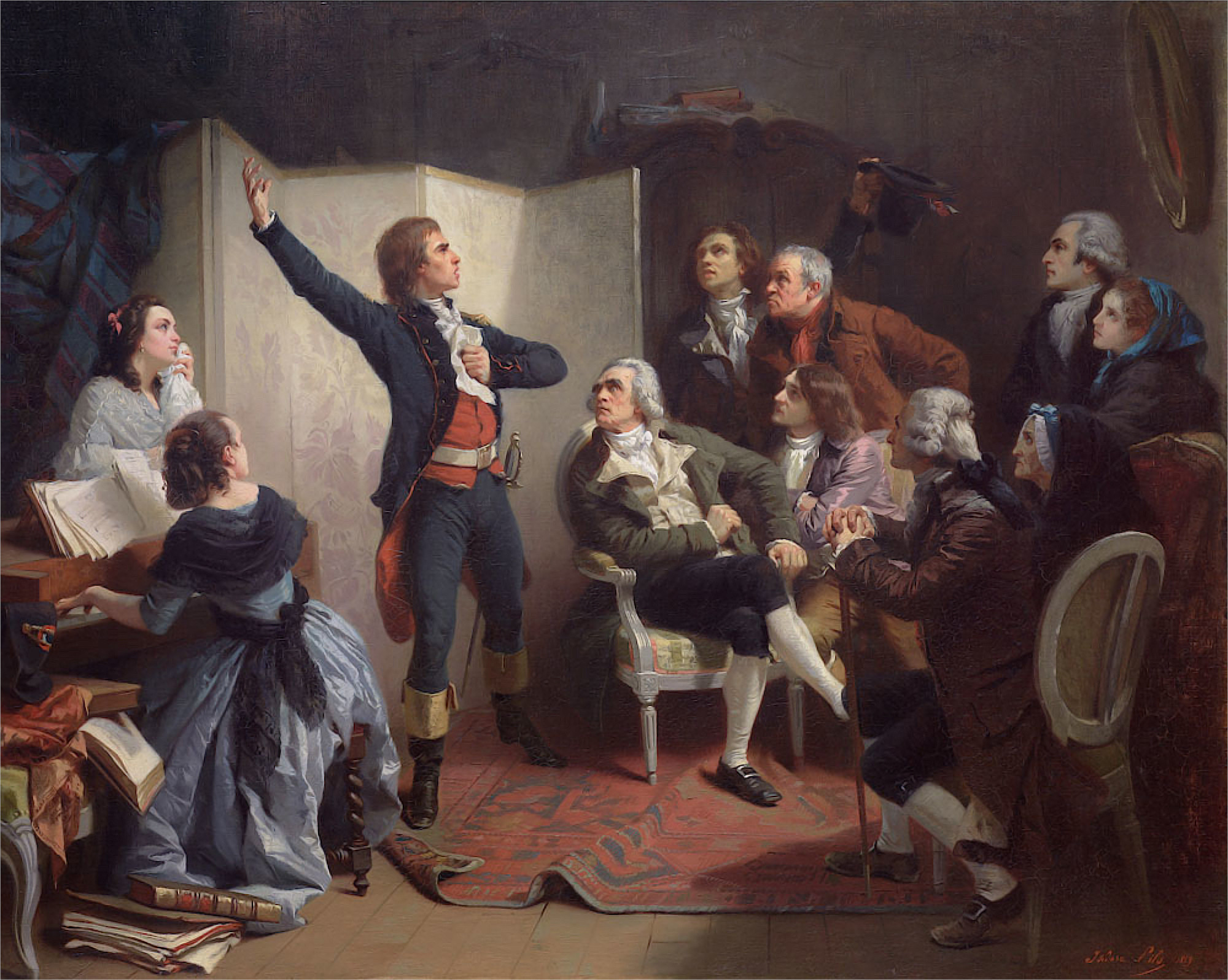
Claude Joseph Rouget de Lisle, the composer of the French national anthem "La Marseillaise", sings it for the first time. The anthem is one of the earliest to be adopted by a modern state, in 1795.

Most nation states have an anthem, defined as "a song, as of praise, devotion, or patriotism"; most anthems are either marches or hymns in style. A song or hymn can become a national anthem under the state's constitution, by a law enacted by its legislature, or simply by tradition. A royal anthem is a patriotic song similar to a national anthem, but it specifically praises or prays for a monarch or royal dynasty. Such anthems are usually performed at public appearances by the monarch or during other events of royal importance. Some states use their royal anthem as the national anthem, such as the state anthem of Jordan.

Anthems became increasingly popular among European states in the 18th century. In 1795, the French First Republic adopted "La Marseillaise" as its national anthem by decree, making France the first country in history to have an official national anthem. Some anthems are older in origin but were not officially adopted until the 19th or 20th century. For example, the Japanese anthem, "Kimigayo", employs the oldest lyrics of any national anthem, taking its words from the "Kokin Wakashū", which was first published in 905, yet these words were not set to music until 1880. The national anthem of the Netherlands, the "Wilhelmus", contains a melody and lyrics dating back to the 16th century, but it was not officially adopted as the country's national anthem until 1932.

National anthems are usually written in the most common language of the state, whether de facto or official. States with multiple national languages may offer several versions of their anthem. For instance, Switzerland's national anthem has different lyrics for each of the country's four official languages: French, German, Italian, and Romansh. One of New Zealand's two national anthems is commonly sung with the first verse in Māori ("Aotearoa") and the second in English ("God Defend New Zealand"). The tune is the same but the lyrics have different meanings. South Africa's national anthem is unique in that it is two different songs put together with five of the country's eleven official languages being used, in which each language comprises a stanza.

Denmark and New Zealand are two countries with two official national anthems of equal status. Denmark has two anthems, Der er et yndigt land ("There is a Lovely Country") and Kong Christian stod ved højen mast ("King Christian stood by the lofty mast"). Der er et yndigt land is considered the civil national anthem and is often played at civil and sports events. Kong Christian stod ved højen mast is both a royal and national anthem. New Zealand has two anthems, God Defend New Zealand and God Save the King. God Defend New Zealand was added in 1977 after a petition to Parliament and Queen Elizabeth II's approval. The two anthems are almost never sung together. Usually the first verse of God Defend New Zealand is sung in Māori ("Aotearoa") and the second in English.

India has both a national anthem, Jana-gana-mana, and a national song, Vande Mataram. Jana-gana-mana was originally written in Bengali by Rabindranath Tagore in 1911 and adopted as the national anthem in 1950. Vande Mataram was composed in Sanskritised Bengali by Bankimchandra Chatterjee in the 1870s and inspired people during their fight for freedom.

== UN member states and observer states ==
State	National anthem (Note: Only United Nations member states and observer states are included in this table.)	Date adopted	Lyricist	Composer/Artist	Audio	Length	Ref.
Afghanistan	"Dā Də Bātorāno Kor" ("National Anthem")	2006	Abdul Bari Jahani	Babrak Wassa	"Dā Də Bātorāno Kor"	1m 13s	
Albania	"Himni i Flamurit" ("The Hymn of the Flag")	1912	Aleksandër Stavre Drenova	Ciprian Porumbescu	"Himni i Flamurit"	1m 6s	
Algeria	"Kassaman" ("We Pledge")	1962, 2008	Moufdi Zakaria	Mohamed Fawzi	"Kassaman"	1m 13s	
Andorra	"El gran Carlemany" ("The Great Charlemagne")	1921	Enric Marfany Bons	Juan Benlloch y Vivó	"El Gran Carlemany"	1m 6s	
Angola	"Angola Avante" ("Onward Angola")	1975	Manuel Rui Alves Monteiro	Ruy Mingas	"Angola Avante"	1m 4s	
Antigua and Barbuda	"Fair Antigua, We Salute Thee"	1967, 1981 de facto	Novelle Richards	Walter P. Chambers	"Fair Antigua, We Salute Thee"	1m 1s	
Argentina	"Himno Nacional Argentino" ("Argentine National Anthem")	1813	Vicente López y Planes	Blas Parera	"Himno Nacional Argentino"	3m 33s	
Armenia	"Mer Hayrenik" ("Our Fatherland")	1918, 1991	Mikael Nalbandian	Barsegh Kanachyan	"Mer Hayrenik"	0m 28s (one verse)	
Australia	"Advance Australia Fair" (Note: "God Save the King" is the royal anthem of Antigua and Barbuda, Australia, the Bahamas, Canada, Jamaica, Papua New Guinea, Saint Kitts and Nevis, the Solomon Islands, and Tuvalu, and one of New Zealand's two national anthems.)	1974, 1984	Peter Dodds McCormick		"Advance Australia Fair"	0m 54s	
Austria	"Bundeshymne der Republik Österreich" ("National Anthem of the Republic of Austria")	1946 (as instrumental); 1947 (with lyrics)	Paula von Preradović	Wolfgang Amadeus Mozart/Johann Holzer	"National Anthem of the Republic of Austria"	1m 29s	
Azerbaijan	"Azərbaycan marşı" ("Azerbaijan's Anthem")	1992	Ahmed Javad	Uzeyir Hajibeyov	"Azərbaycan Dövlət Himni"	2m 12s	
The Bahamas	"March On, Bahamaland"	1973	Timothy Gibson		"March On, Bahamaland"	1m 15s	
Bahrain	"Bahrainona" ("Our Bahrain")	1971 (music only); 1985 (original); 2002 (current)	Mohamed Sudqi Ayyash	Unknown	"Our Bahrain"	0m 49s	
Bangladesh	"Amar Shonar Bangla" ("My Golden Bengal")	1971 (provisional); 1972 (official)	Rabindranath Tagore	Samar Das	"Amar Shonar Bangla"	2m 15s	
Barbados	"In Plenty and In Time of Need"	1966	Irving Burgie	C. Van Roland Edwards	"In Plenty and In Time of Need"	1m 19s	
Belarus	"My Belarusy" ("We, the Belarusians") (Note: "My Belarusy" was originally adopted by the Byelorussian Soviet Socialist Republic.)	1955 (music); 2002 (with current lyrics)	Michael Klimovich	Nestar Sakalowski	"My Belarusy"	3m 32s	
Belgium	"La Brabançonne" ("The Brabantian")	1860	Jenneval (Louis-Alexandre Dechet)	François Van Campenhout	"The Brabançonne"	1m 3s	
Belize	"Land of the Free"	1981	Samuel Alfred Haynes	Selwyn Walford Young	"Land of the Free"	2m 42s	
Benin	"L'Aube Nouvelle" ("The Dawn of a New Day")	1960	Gilbert Jean Dagnon		"L'Aube Nouvelle"	1m 8s	
Bhutan	"Druk Tsenden" ("The Thunder Dragon Kingdom")	1953	Dasho Gyaldun Thinley	Aku Tongmi		1m 45s	
Bolivia	"Himno Nacional de Bolivia" ("National Anthem of Bolivia")	1851	José Ignacio de Sanjinés	Leopoldo Benedetto Vincenti	"Himno Nacional de Bolivia"	1m 41s	
Bosnia and Herzegovina	"Državna himna Bosne i Hercegovine" ("The National Anthem of Bosnia and Herzegovina")	1999 (de facto); 2001 (de jure)	Awaiting official approval	Dušan Šestić		0m 25s	
Botswana	"Fatshe leno la rona" ("Blessed Be This Noble Land")	1966	Kgalemang Tumedisco Motsete		"Fatshe leno la rona"	0m 57s	
Brazil	"Hino Nacional Brasileiro" ("Brazilian National Anthem")	1890; 1922 (lyrics adopted)	Joaquim Osório Duque Estrada	Francisco Manuel da Silva	"Hino Nacional Brasileiro"	3m 21s	
Brunei	"Allah Peliharakan Sultan" ("God Bless the Sultan")	1951	Pengiran Haji Mohamed Yusuf bin Abdul Rahim	Besar bin Sagap	"Allah Peliharakan Sultan"	1m 5s	
Bulgaria	"Mila Rodino" ("Dear Motherland")	1964	Tsvetan Radoslavov		"Mila Rodino"	2m 1s	
Burkina Faso	"Une Seule Nuit" ("One Single Night")	1984	Thomas Sankara		Une Seule Nuit	1m 47s	
Burundi	"Burundi Bwacu" ("Our Burundi")	1962	Jean-Baptiste Ntahokaja and others	Marc Barengayabo	"Burundi Bwacu"	1m 50s	
Cambodia	"Nokor Reach" ("Royal Kingdom")	1941, 1975, 1993	Samdach Chuon Nat	F. Perruchot and J. Jekyll	"Nokoreach"	1m 30s	
Cameroon	"O Cameroun, Berceau de nos Ancêtres" ("O Cameroon, Cradle of Our Forefathers")	1957 (French version); 1978 (English version)	René Djam Afame, Samuel Minkio Bamba, Moïse Nyatte Nko'o (French), Dr Bernard Fonlon (English)	René Djam Afame		0m 58s	
Canada	"O Canada" ("Ô Canada")	1980	Adolphe-Basile Routhier (French); Robert Stanley Weir (English)	Calixa Lavallée	"O Canada"	1m 23s	
Cape Verde	"Cântico da Liberdade" ("Song of Freedom")	1996	Amílcar Spencer Lopes	Adalberto Higino Tavares Silva	"Cântico da Liberdade"	1m 11s	
Central African Republic	"La Renaissance" ("The Rebirth")	1960	Barthélémy Boganda	Herbert Pepper	”La Renaissance	1m 6s	
Chad	"La Tchadienne" ("People of Chad")	1960	Louis Gidrol and others	Paul Villard	"La Tchadienne"	1m 1s	
Chile	"Himno Nacional de Chile" ("National Anthem of Chile")	1828	Eusebio Lillo	Ramón Carnicer	"Himno Nacional de Chile"	2m 2s	
China	"Yìyǒngjūn Jìnxíngqǔ" ("March of the Volunteers")	1949 (provisional); 1982 (official); 2004 (constitutional)	Tian Han	Nie Er	"Yìyǒngjūn Jìnxíngqǔ"	0m 44s	
Colombia	"Himno Nacional de la República de Colombia" ("National Anthem of the Republic of Colombia")	1920	Rafael Núñez	Oreste Sindici	"Himno Nacional de la República de Colombia"	2m 41s	
Comoros	"Udzima wa ya Masiwa" ("The Union of the Great Islands")	1978	Said Hachim Sidi Abderemane	Said Hachim Sidi Abderemane and Kamildine Abdallah	"Udzima wa ya Masiwa"	1m 37s	
Costa Rica	"Himno Nacional de Costa Rica" ("National Anthem of Costa Rica")	1852	José María Zeledón Brenes	Manuel María Gutiérrez	"Himno Nacional de Costa Rica"	1m 50s	
Croatia	"Lijepa naša domovino" ("Our Beautiful Homeland") (Note: "Lijepa naša domovino" was originally adopted by the Socialist Republic of Croatia.)	1972	Antun Mihanović	Josip Runjanin	"Lijepa naša domovino"	0m 59s	
Cuba	"El Himno de Bayamo" ("The Anthem of Bayamo")	1902, 1909	Perucho Figueredo		"El Himno de Bayamo"	0m 53s	
Cyprus	"Ýmnos eis tīn Eleutherían" ("Hymn to Liberty") (Note: "Hymn to Liberty" or "Hymn to Freedom" is the national anthem of both Cyprus and Greece.) (Note: By the power of the Constitution of Cyprus, the Turkish national anthem "İstiklâl Marşı" was used when a Turkish Cypriot representative was present. The practice lasted up to 1963.)	1966	Dionýsios Solomós	Nikolaos Mantzaros	"Ýmnos eis tīn Eleutherían"	0m 45s	
Czech Republic	"Kde domov můj" ("Where My Home is") (Note: Originally adopted by Czechoslovakia as a part of its hymn in 1918 (together with Slovak "Nad Tatrou sa blýska"), and later in 1993 by the Czech Republic (already without the Slovak part).)	1918, 1990	Josef Kajetán Tyl	František Škroup	"Kde domov můj"	1m 12s	
Democratic Republic of the Congo	"Debout Congolais" ("Arise Congolese")	1960, 1997	Joseph Lutumba	Simon-Pierre Boka	"Debout Congolais"	1m 27s	
Denmark	"Kong Christian stod ved højen mast" (Note: One of two Danish national anthems, but this one is mainly used for royal and military occasions) ("King Christian stood by the lofty mast")	1780	Johannes Ewald	Unknown	"Kong Christian stod ved højen mast"	1m 11s	
Denmark	"Der er et yndigt land" (Note: Although both Danish anthems have equal status, this one is regarded as the civil national anthem of Denmark.) ("There is a lovely land")	1835	Adam Oehlenschläger	Hans Ernst Krøyer	"Der er et yndigt land"	1m 20s	
Djibouti	"Djibouti"	1977	Aden Elmi	Abdi Robleh	"Djibouti"	0m 48s	
Dominica	"Isle of Beauty, Isle of Splendour"	1978	Wilfred Oscar Morgan Pond	Lemuel McPherson Christian	"Isle of Beauty, Isle of Splendour"	0m 49s	
Dominican Republic	"Himno Nacional" ("National Anthem")	1934	Emilio Prud'Homme	José Rufino Reyes y Siancas	"Himno Nacional"	1m 37s	
Ecuador	"Salve, Oh Patria" ("Hail, Oh Fatherland")	1948	Juan León Mera	Antonio Neumane	"Salve, Oh Patria"	3m 19s	
Egypt	"Biladi, Biladi, Biladi" ("My Country, My Country, My Country")	1923; 1952 (unofficial); 1979 (official)	Mohamed Younis Al-Qady (adapted from a speech by Mustafa Kamil)	Sayed Darwish	"Bilady, Bilady, Bilady"	1m 26s	
El Salvador	"Himno Nacional de El Salvador" ("National Anthem of El Salvador")	1879 (de facto); 1953 (de jure)	Juan José Cañas	Juan Aberle	"Himno Nacional de El Salvador"	4m 14s	
Equatorial Guinea	"Caminemos pisando las sendas de nuestra inmensa felicidad" ("Let Us Tread the Path of our Immense Happiness")	1968	Atanasio Ndongo Miyone	Ramiro Sánchez Lopes	"Caminemos pisando las sendas de nuestra inmensa felicidad"	1m 54s	
Eritrea	"Ertra, Ertra, Ertra" ("Eritrea, Eritrea, Eritrea")	1993	Solomon Tsehaye Beraki	Isaac Abraham Meharezghi and Aron Tekle Tesfatsion	"Ertra, Ertra, Ertra"	1m 59s	
Estonia	"Mu isamaa, mu õnn ja rõõm" ("My Fatherland, My Happiness and Joy")	1920, 1990	Johann Voldemar Jannsen	Fredrik Pacius	"Mu isamaa, mu õnn ja rõõm"	0m 32s	
Eswatini	"Nkulunkulu Mnikati wetibusiso temaSwati" ("O Lord our God of the Swazi")	1968	Andrease Enoke Fanyana Simelane	David Kenneth Rycroft	"Nkulunkulu Mnikati wetibusiso temaSwati"	1m 8s	
Ethiopia	"Wodefit Gesgeshi, Widd Innat Ityopp'ya" ("March Forward, Dear Mother Ethiopia")	1992	Dereje Melaku Mengesha	Solomon Lulu Mitiku	"Wodefit Gesgeshi, Widd Innat Ityopp'ya"	1m 24s	
Fiji	"Meda Dau Doka" ("God Bless Fiji")	1970	Michael Francis Alexander Prescott	Charles Austin Miles	"Meda Dau Doka"	1m 26s	
Finland	Finnish: "Maamme"; Swedish: "Vårt Land" ("Our Land")	1917 (Note: First performed in 1848. National anthem status gained through convention after independence in 1917.)	Johan Ludvig Runeberg (Swedish); Paavo Cajander (Finnish)	Fredrik Pacius	"Maamme"	0m 46s	
France	"La Marseillaise" ("The Marseillaise")	1795, 1870	Claude Joseph Rouget de Lisle		"La Marseillaise"	1m 19s	
Gabon	"La Concorde" ("The Concorde")	1960	Georges Aleka Damas		"La Concorde"	1m 45s	
The Gambia	"For The Gambia Our Homeland"	1965	Virginia Julie Howe	Jeremy Frederick Howe	"For The Gambia Our Homeland"	1m 20s	
Georgia	"Tavisupleba" ("Freedom")	2004	David Magradze	Zakaria Paliashvili	"Tavisupleda"	1m 26s	
Germany	"Lied der Deutschen" ("Song of the Germans") (Note: Only the third stanza is the official national anthem.)	1922, 1952	August Heinrich Hoffmann von Fallersleben	Joseph Haydn	"Lied der Deutschen"	1m 20s	
Ghana	"God Bless Our Homeland Ghana"	1957	Government committee	Philip Gbeho	"God Bless Our Homeland Ghana"	0m 57s	
Greece	"Hýmnos is tin Eleftherían" ("Hymn to Liberty" or "Hymn to Freedom")	1865	Dionýsios Solomós	Nikolaos Mantzaros	"Ýmnos eis tīn Eleutherían"	0m 45s	
Grenada	"Hail Grenada"	1974	Irva Merle Baptiste	Louis Arnold Masanto	"Hail Grenada"	1m 17s	
Guatemala	"Himno Nacional de Guatemala" ("National Anthem of Guatemala")	1897	José Joaquín Palma	Rafael Álvarez Ovalle	"Himno Nacional de Guatemala"	1m 38s	
Guinea	"Liberté" ("Freedom")	1958	Unknown	Kodofo Moussa	"Liberté"	1m 12s	
Guinea-Bissau	"Esta É a Nossa Pátria Amada" ("This Is Our Beloved Country")	1974	Amílcar Cabral	Xiao He		1m 1s	
Guyana	"Dear Land of Guyana, of Rivers and Plains"	1966	Archibald Leonard Luker	Robert Cyril Gladstone Potter	"Dear Land of Guyana, of Rivers and Plains"	0m 53s	
Haiti	"La Dessalinienne" ("Song of Dessalines")	1904	Justin Lhérisson	Nicolas Geffrard	"La Dessalinienne"	0m 37s	
Honduras	"Himno Nacional de Honduras" ("National Anthem of Honduras")	1915	Augusto Constancio Coello	Carlos Hartling	"Himno Nacional de Honduras"	2m 47s	
Hungary	"Himnusz" ("Hymn")	1844 (de facto); 1989 (de jure)	Ferenc Kölcsey	Ferenc Erkel	"Himnusz"	1m 41s	
Iceland	"Lofsöngur" ("Hymn")	1944	Matthías Jochumsson	Sveinbjörn Sveinbjörnsson	"Lofsöngur"	1m 39s	
India	"Jana Gana Mana" ("Thou Art the Ruler of the Minds of All People")	1950	Rabindranath Tagore	Ram Singh Thakuri	"Jana Gana Mana"	0m 52s	
Indonesia	"Indonesia Raya" ("Indonesia the Great")	1945 (original); 1950 (official)	Wage Rudolf Soepratman		"Indonesia Raya"	1m 43s	
Iran	"Soroud-e Melli-e Jomhouri-e Eslami-e Iran" ("National Anthem of Iran")	1990	Sayed Bagheri	Hassan Riyahi	"Mehr-e Khâvarân"	0m 57s	
Iraq	"Mawtini" ("My Homeland")	2004	Ibrahim Touqan	Mohammed Flayfel	"Mawtini"	1m 45s	
Ireland	"Amhrán na bhFiann" ("The Soldier's Song")	1926	Peadar Kearney (English); Liam Ó Rinn (Irish)	Peadar Kearney and Patrick Heeney	"Amhrán na bhFiann"	0m 59s	
Israel	"Hatikvah" ("The Hope")	1948	Naftali Herz Imber	Samuel Cohen	"HaTikvah"	1m 14s	
Italy	"Il Canto degli Italiani" ("The Song of the Italians")	1946 (de facto); 2017 (de jure)	Goffredo Mameli	Michele Novaro	"Il Canto degli Italiani"	1m 39s	
Ivory Coast	"L'Abidjanaise" ("Song of Abidjan")	1960	Mathieu Vangah Ekra, Joachim Bony and Pierre Marie Coty	Pierre-Michel Pango	"L'Abidjanaise"	1m 9s	
Jamaica	"Jamaica, Land We Love"	1962	Hugh Sherlock	Robert Lightbourne	"Jamaica, Land We Love"	1m 21s	
Japan	"Kimigayo" ("His Majesty's Reign")	1869 (original music); 1870 (lyrics); 1880 (current music); 1999 (law)	Traditional Waka poem from the Kokin Wakashū (first published in 905)	Yoshiisa Oku and Akimori Hayashi; usually credited to Hiromori Hayashi	"Kimi ga Yo"	0m 59s	
Jordan	"Al-salam Al-malaki Al-urdoni" ("The Royal Anthem of Jordan")	1946	Abdul Monem Al-Refai	Abdul Qader al-Taneer	"Al-salam Al-malaki Al-urdoni"	0m 36s	
Kazakhstan	"Qazaqstan Respublikasınıñ änuranı" ("State Anthem of the Republic of Kazakhstan")	2006	Zhumeken Nazhimedenov (with modifications by Nursultan Nazarbayev)	Shamshi Kaldayakov	"Meniñ Qazaqstanım"	1m 50s	
Kenya	"Ee Mungu Nguvu Yetu" ("Oh God of All Creation")	1963	Graham Hyslop, G. W. Senoga-Zake, Thomas Kalume, Peter Kibukosya, and Washington Omondi	The Anthem Commission	"Ee Mungu Nguvu Yetu"	1m 52s	
Kiribati	"Kunan Kiribati" ("Song of Kiribati")	1979	Tamuera Ioteba Uriam		"Teirake Kaini Kiribati"	0m 45s	
Kuwait	"Al-Nasheed Al-Watani" ("National Anthem")	1978	Ahmad Meshari Al-Adwani	Ibrahim Al-Soula	"Al-Nasheed Al-Watani"	0m 35s	
Kyrgyzstan	"Kyrgyz Respublikasynyn Mamlekettik Gimni" ("State Anthem of the Kyrgyz Republic")	1992	Djamil Sadykov and Eshmambet Kuluev	Nasyr Davlesov and Kalyi Moldobasanov	"Kyrgyz Respublikasynyn Mamlekettik Gimni"	2m 3s	
Laos	"Pheng Xat Lao" ("Hymn of the Lao People")	1945	Sisana Sisane	Thongdy Sounthonevichit	"Pheng Xat Lao"	0m 50s	
Latvia	"Dievs, svētī Latviju!" ("God Bless Latvia")	1920, 1990	Kārlis Baumanis		"Dievs, svētī Latviju!"	1m 45s	
Lebanon	"Lebanese National Anthem"	1927	Rashid Nakhle	Wadia Sabra	"Lebanese National Anthem"	0m 51s	
Lesotho	"Lesotho Fatše La Bontata Rona" ("Lesotho, Land of Our Fathers")	1967	François Coillard	Ferdinand-Samuel Laur	"Lesotho Fatše La Bontata Rona"	0m 43s	
Liberia	"All Hail, Liberia, Hail!"	1847	Daniel Bashiel Warner	Olmstead Luca	"All Hail, Liberia, Hail!"	1m 28s	
Libya	"Libya, Libya, Libya"	2011	Al Bashir Al Arebi	Mohammed Abdel Wahab	"Libya, Libya, Libya!"	1m 8s	
Liechtenstein	"Oben am jungen Rhein" ("High on the young Rhine")	1963	Jakob Josef Jauch	Unknown (Note: Uses the same melody as "God Save the King")	"Oben am jungen Rhein"	1m 25s	
Lithuania	"Tautiška giesmė" ("National Song")	1919, 1988	Vincas Kudirka		"Tautiška giesmė"	1m 47s	
Luxembourg	"Ons Heemecht" ("Our Homeland")	1895 (de facto); 1993 (de jure)	Michel Lentz	Jean Antoine Zinnen	"Ons Heemecht"	1m 24s	
Madagascar	"Ry Tanindrazanay malala ô!" ("Oh, Beloved Land of our Ancestors")	1959	Pastor Rahajason	Norbert Raharisoa	"Ry Tanindrazanay malala ô!"	1m 2s	
Malawi	"Mulungu dalitsa Malaŵi" ("God Bless Malawi")	1964	Michael-Fredrick Paul Sauka		"Mulungu dalitsa Malaŵi"	0m 52s	
Malaysia	"Negaraku" ("My Country")	1957	multiple	Pierre-Jean de Béranger	"Negaraku"	1m 24s	
Maldives	"Gaumii salaam" ("National Salute")	1972	Mohamed Jameel Didi	Pandit Wannakuwattawaduge Don Amaradeva	"Gaumii salaam"	1m 8s	
Mali	"Le Mali" ("Mali")	1962	Seydou Badian Kouyate	Banzumana Sissoko	"Le Mali"	1m 19s	
Malta	"L-Innu Malti" ("The Maltese Hymn")	1964	Dun Karm Psaila	Robert Samut	"L-Innu Malti"	0m 49s	
Marshall Islands	"Forever Marshall Islands"	1991	Amata Kabua		"Forever Marshall Islands"	2m 18s	
Mauritania	"Bilada-l ubati-l hudati-l kiram" ("Country of the Proud, Guiding Noblemen")	2017	Unknown	Rageh Daoud	Bilada-l ubati-l hudati-l kiram	1m 27s	
Mauritius	"Motherland"	1968	Jean Georges Prosper	Philippe Gentil (M.B.E. Esq.)	"Motherland"	0m 59s	
Mexico	"Himno Nacional Mexicano" ("Mexican National Anthem")	1943	Francisco González Bocanegra	Jaime Nunó	"Himno Nacional Mexicano"	1m 42s	
Micronesia	"Patriots of Micronesia"	1991	Unknown	Traditional German song (Ich hab' mich ergeben)	"Patriots of Micronesia"	0m 36s	
Moldova	"Limba noastră" ("Our Language")	1994 (unofficial); 1995	Alexei Mateevici	Alexandru Cristea	"Limba noastră"	1m 11s	
Monaco	"Hymne monégasque" ("Monégasque Anthem")	1848	Louis Notari	Charles Albrecht	"Hymne Monégasque"	1m 18s	
Mongolia	"Mongol ulsiin töriin duulal" ("National Anthem of Mongolia")	1950	Tsendiin Damdinsüren	Bilegiin Damdinsüren and Luvsanjambyn Mördorj		2m 6s	
Montenegro	"Oj, svijetla majska zoro" ("O, Bright Dawn of May")	2004	folk song	Žarko Mirković	"Oj, svijetla majska zoro"	2m 5s	
Morocco	"An-Nashid As-Sharif" ("Cherifian Anthem")	1956	Ali Squalli Houssaini	Léo Morgan	"Cherifian Anthem"	1m 8s	
Mozambique	"Pátria Amada" ("Beloved Homeland")	2002	Salomão J. Manhiça and Mia Couto	Justino Sigaulane Chemane	"Pátria Amada"	1m 1s	
Myanmar	"Kaba Ma Kyei" ("Until the End of the World")	1947	U Sein Mya Maung	YMB Saya Tin	”Kaba Ma Kyei”	0m 40s	
Namibia	"Namibia, Land of the Brave"	1991	Axali Doëseb			1m 29s	
Nauru	"Nauru Bwiema" ("Song of Nauru")	1968	Margaret Hendrie	Laurence Henry Hicks	"Nauru Bwiema"	1m 18s	
Nepal	"Sayaun Thunga Phulka" ("Made of Hundreds of Flowers")	2007	Byakul Maila	Amber Gurung	"Sayaun Thunga Phulka"	1m 10s	
Netherlands	"Wilhelmus" ("William")	1932	Philips of Marnix, or Dirck Coornhert or Petrus Dathenus	Adrianus Valerius	"The Wilhelmus"	1m 5s	
New Zealand	"God Defend New Zealand"	1940 (national hymn); 1977 (national anthem)	Thomas Bracken (English version) Thomas H. Smith (Māori version)	John Joseph Woods	"God Defend New Zealand"	1m 3s	
New Zealand	"God Save the King"	1977	Unknown		"God Save the King"	1m 3s	
Nicaragua	"Salve a ti, Nicaragua" ("Hail to Thee, Nicaragua")	1939, 1971	Salomón Ibarra Mayorga	Luis A. Delgadillo	"Salve a ti, Nicaragua"	0m 56s	
Niger	"L'Honneur de la Patrie" ("The Honour of the Fatherland")	2023	Unknown		"L'Honneur de la Patrie"	1m 24s	
Nigeria	"Nigeria, We Hail Thee"	1960, 2024	Lillian Jean Williams	Frances Berda	"Nigeria, We Hail Thee"	1m 28s	
North Korea	"Aegukka" ("The Patriotic Song")	1947	Pak Seyŏng	Kim Wŏn'gyun	[[:File:|"Aegukka"]]	1m 27s	
North Macedonia	"Denes nad Makedonija" ("Today over Macedonia")	1992	Vlado Maleski	Todor Skalovski	"Denes nad Makedonija"	0m 50s	
Norway	"Ja, vi elsker dette landet" ("Yes, We Love This Country") (Note: Until the early 20th century, "Sønner av Norge" was the most recognised national anthem of Norway. Also "Norges Skaal" and "Mitt lille land" have at times been described as national anthems. Norway's unofficial royal anthem is "Kongesangen".)	1864 (de facto); 2019 (de jure) (Note: "Ja, vi elsker dette landet" was first performed in 1864, but only gradually came to replace the older national anthem "Sønner av Norge" as de facto national anthem. It was adopted as the official national anthem 11 December 2019.)	Bjørnstjerne Bjørnson	Rikard Nordraak	"Ja, vi elsker dette landet"	1m 2s	
Oman	"Nashid as-Salaam as-Sultani" ("Sultanic Salute")	1970	Rashid bin Uzayyiz Al Khusaidi	James Frederick Mills, arranged by Bernard Ebbinghaus	"Nashid as-Salaam as-Sultani"	1m 54s	
Pakistan	"Qaumi Taranah" ("National Anthem")	1954	Hafeez Jullundhri	Ahmed Ghulamali Chagla	"Qaumī Tarāna"	1m 22s	
Palau	"Belau rekid" ("Our Palau")	1981	multiple	Ymesei O. Ezekiel	"Belau rekid"	0m 52s	
Palestine	"Fida'i" ("Fida'i")	1996	Said Al Muzayin	Ali Ismael	”Fida’i”	0m 58s	
Panama	"Himno Istmeño" ("Hymn of the Isthmus")	1906	Jeronimo de la Ossa	Santos Jorge	"Himno Istmeño"	1m 50s	
Papua New Guinea	"O Arise, All You Sons"	1975	Tom Shacklady		"O Arise, All You Sons"	0m 58s	
Paraguay	"Himno Nacional Paraguayo" ("Paraguayan National Anthem")	1846	Francisco Acuña de Figueroa	Francisco José Debali	"Paraguayos, República o Muerte"	3m 11s	
Peru	"Himno Nacional del Perú" ("National Anthem of Peru")	1821	José de la Torre Ugarte y Alarcón	Jose Bernardo Alcedo	"Himno Nacional del Perú"	3m 9s	
Philippines	"Lupang Hinirang" ("Chosen Land")	1898	José Palma	Julián Felipe	"Lupang Hinirang"	1m 2s	
Poland	"Mazurek Dąbrowskiego" ("Poland Is Not Yet Lost") (Note: Also known by its incipit: "Jeszcze Polska nie zginęła, kiedy my żyjemy" ("Poland Is Not Yet Lost, So long as we still live").)	1927	Józef Wybicki		"Mazurek Dąbrowskiego"	0m 43s	
Portugal	"A Portuguesa" ("The Portuguese")	1910	Henrique Lopes de Mendonça	Alfredo Keil	"A Portuguesa"	1m 18s	
Qatar	"As Salam al Amiri" ("Peace to the Amir")	1996	Sheikh Mubarak bin Saïf al-Thani	Abdul Aziz Nasser Obaidan	"As Salam Al Amiri"	1m 27s	
Republic of the Congo	"La Congolaise" ("The Congolese")	1959, 1991	Jacques Tondra and Georges Kibanghi	Jean Royer and Joseph Spadilière	"La Congolaise"	1m 15s	
Romania	"Deșteaptă-te, române!" ("Awaken Thee, Romanian!")	1990	Andrei Mureșanu	Anton Pann and Gheorghe Ucenescu	"Deșteaptă-te, române!"	2m 19s	
Russia	"Gosudarstvenny Gimn Rossiyskoy Federatsii" ("State Hymn of the Russian Federation")	2000	Sergey Mikhalkov	Alexander Vasilyevich Alexandrov	"Gosudarstvenny Gimn Rossiyskoy Federatsii"	1m 22s	
Rwanda	"Rwanda Nziza" ("Beautiful Rwanda")	2002	Faustin Murigo	Jean-Bosco Hashakimana	"Rwanda Nziza"	2m 19s	
Saint Kitts and Nevis	"O Land of Beauty!"	1983	Kenrick Georges		"O Land of Beauty!"	1m 3s	
Saint Lucia	"Sons and Daughters of Saint Lucia"	1979	Charles Jesse	Leton Felix Thomas	"Sons and Daughters of Saint Lucia"	0m 43s	
Saint Vincent and the Grenadines	"Saint Vincent, Land so beautiful"	1979	Phyllis Punnett	Joel Bertram Miguel	"Saint Vincent, Land so Beautiful"	0m 51s	
Samoa	"The Banner of Freedom"	1962	Sauni Iiga Kuresa		"The Banner of Freedom"	1m 13s	
San Marino	"Terra di Libertà" ("Land of Liberty")	2025	Giosuè Carducci	Federico Consolo	"Inno Nazionale della Repubblica"	0m 54s	
São Tomé and Príncipe	"Independência total" ("Total Independence")	1975	Alda Neves da Graça do Espírito Santo	Manuel dos Santos Barreto de Sousa e Almeida	"Independência total"	2m 5s	
Saudi Arabia	"As-Salam Al Malaki" ("The Royal Salute")	1950	Ibrahim Khafaji	Abdul Rahman Al-Khateeb	"As-Salam Al Malaki"	0m 38s	
Senegal	"Le Lion rouge" ("The Red Lion")	1960	Léopold Sédar Senghor	Herbert Pepper	"Pincez tous vos koras, frappez les balafons"	0m 56s	
Serbia	"Bože pravde" ("God of Justice")	1882, 2004	Jovan Đorđević	Davorin Jenko	"Bože pravde"	1m 43s	
Seychelles	"Koste Seselwa" ("Join together all Seychellois")	1996	David François Marc André and George Charles Robert Payet		"Koste Seselwa"	1m 7s	
Sierra Leone	"High We Exalt Thee, Realm of the Free"	1961	Clifford Nelson Fyle	John Akar	"High We Exalt Thee, Realm of the Free"	0m 46s	
Singapore	"Majulah Singapura" ("Onward Singapore")	1959	Zubir Said		"Majulah Singapura"	1m 19s	
Slovakia	"Nad Tatrou sa blýska" ("Lightning Over the Tatras")	1993	Janko Matúška	Unknown; folk tune	"Nad Tatrou sa blýska"	1m 18s	
Slovenia	"Zdravljica" ("A Toast") (Note: "Zdravljica" was originally adopted by the Socialist Republic of Slovenia. Only the seventh stanza of the song is the national anthem.)	1989 (as regional anthem); 1994 (as national anthem)	France Prešeren	Stanko Premrl	"Zdravljica"	0m 56s	
Solomon Islands	"God Save Our Solomon Islands"	1978	Panapasa Balekana and Matila Balekana	Panapasa Balekana		1m 22s	
Somalia	"Qolobaa Calankeed" ("Praise to the Flag")	2012	Abdullahi Qarshe		"Qolobaa Calankeed"	1m 6s	
South Africa	"National anthem of South Africa" (Note: The "National Anthem of South Africa" is a hybrid of "Nkosi Sikelel' iAfrika" ("God Bless Africa") and "Die Stem van Suid-Afrika" ("The Call of South Africa").)	1997	Enoch Sontonga and C. J. Langenhoven	Enoch Sontonga and Marthinus Lourens de Villiers	"National Anthem of South Africa"	2m 3s	
South Korea	"Aegukga" ("The Patriotic Song")	1948	An Chang-ho	Ahn Eak-tae	"Aegukga"	0m 57s	
South Sudan	"South Sudan Oyee!"	2011	Students and teachers of Juba University, 2011		"South Sudan Oyee!"	1m 17s	
Spain	"Marcha Real" ("Royal March")	1770, 1942 (Note: Declared official "Honor March" by Charles III in 1770, abolished 1820-1823, adopted as the official Spanish anthem under Isabel II (r. 1833–1868), co-official during 1873-1874 and again abolished 1931-1939. Re-introduced in 1942.)	Alfonso XIII	Manuel de Espinosa de los Monteros	"La Marcha Real"	0m 54s	
Sri Lanka	"Sri Lanka Matha" ("Mother Sri Lanka")	1951	Ananda Samarakoon (Sinhala) M. Nallathambi (Tamil)	Ananda Samarakoon	"Sri Lanka Matha"	2m 53s	
Sudan	"Nahnu Jund Allah Jund Al-watan" ("We Are the Army of God and of Our Land")	1956	Sayyed Ahmed Mohammed Salih	Ahmad Murjan	"Nahnu Jund Allah Jund Al-watan"	0m 46s	
Suriname	"God zij met ons Suriname" ("God Be With Our Suriname")	1959	Cornelis Atses Hoekstra and Henry de Ziel	Johannes Corstianus de Puy	"God zij met ons Suriname"	0m 54s	
Sweden	"Du gamla, du fria" ("Thou Ancient, Thou Free") (Note: Sweden's royal anthem is "Kungssången".)	1866 de facto (never adopted de jure)	Richard Dybeck	folk tune	"Du gamla, du fria"	1m 28s	
Switzerland	"Schweizerpsalm" ("Swiss Psalm")	1961 (de facto); 1981 (de jure)	Leonhard Widmer (German), Charles Chatelanat (French), Camillo Valsangiacomo (Italian), and Flurin Camathias (Romansch)	Alberich Zwyssig	"Schweizerpsalm"	1m 24s	
Syria	"Ḥumāt ad-Diyār" ("Guardians of the Homeland", de jure) (Note: Syria has been governed by a transitional government since the fall of the Assad regime on 8 December 2024, and it remains unclear whether this song will continue to be used as the national anthem. In March 2025, President Ahmed al-Sharaa signed the Constitutional Declaration, whose Article 5 states that the national anthem shall be determined by law.); Fī Sabīli al-Majd ("In Pursuit of Glory", de facto) (Note: After the fall of the Ba'athist regime in 2024, the anthem Ḥumāt ad-Diyār (Arabic: حُمَاةَ الدَّيَّارِ, lit. 'Guardians of the Homeland') was briefly abandoned. However, on 18 January 2025, a de facto new anthem, Fī Sabīli al-Majd (Arabic: في سبيل المجد, lit. 'In Pursuit of Glory'), was played during a football match after the Syrian Football Association notified FIFA that it had adopted the song as its new anthem. Since then, the official status and continued use of the anthem have remained unclear.)	1938, 1961, 2024 (briefly, de facto); 2024 (de facto)	Khalil Mardam Bey ("Ḥumāt ad-Diyār"); Omar Abu Risha ("Fī Sabīli al-Majd")	Mohammed Flayfel ("Ḥumāt ad-Diyār"); Ahmed and Mohammed Flayfel ("Fī Sabīli al-Majd")	"Humāt ad-Diyār" (de jure) "Fī Sabīli al-Majd" (de facto)	1m 6s (de jure); 2m 11s (de facto)	
Tajikistan	"Surudi Milli" ("National Anthem")	1994	Gulnazar Keldi	Suleiman Yudakov	"Surudi Milli"	1m 55s	
Tanzania	"Mungu ibariki Afrika" ("God Bless Africa")	1961	collectively	Enoch Sontonga	"Mungu ibariki Afrika"	0m 52s	
Thailand	"Phleng Chat" ("National Song") (Note: Thailand's royal anthem is "Phleng Sansoen Phra Barami".)	1932, 1939 (with current name and lyrics), 1949	Luang Saranupraphan	Peter Feit	"Phleng Chat"	0m 44s	
Timor-Leste	"Pátria" ("Fatherland")	1975, 2002	Francisco Borja da Costa	Afonso de Araujo	"Pátria"	2m 9s	
Togo	"Salut à toi, pays de nos aïeux" ("Hail to Thee, Land of our Forefathers")	1960, 1992	Alex Casimir-Dosseh		"Salut à toi, pays de nos aïeux"	0m 52s	
Tonga	"Ko e fasi ʻo e tuʻi ʻo e ʻOtu Tonga" ("Song of the King of the Tonga Islands")	1874	Uelingatoni Ngū Tupoumalohi	Carl Gustav Schmitt	"Ko e fasi ʻo e tuʻi ʻo e ʻOtu Tonga"	0m 49s	
Trinidad and Tobago	"Forged from the Love of Liberty"	1962	Patrick Castagne		"Forged from the Love of Liberty"	1m 15s	
Tunisia	"Humat al-Hima" ("Defenders of the Homeland")	1957, 1987	Mustafa Sadiq Al-Rafi'i and Aboul-Qacem Echebbi	Mohammed Abdel Wahab	"Humat al-Hima"	0m 52s	
Turkey	"İstiklâl Marşı" ("The March of Independence")	1921	Mehmet Akif Ersoy	Osman Zeki Üngör	"İstiklâl Marşı"	1m 5s	
Turkmenistan	"Garaşsyz, Bitarap Türkmenistanyň Döwlet Gimni" ("The State Anthem of Independent and Neutral Turkmenistan")	1996 (original version); 2008 (current version)	collectively	Veli Mukhatov	"Türkmenbaşyň guran beýik binasy"	2m 0s	
Tuvalu	"Tuvalu mo te Atua" ("Tuvalu for the Almighty")	1978	Afaese Manoa		"Tuvalu mo te Atua"	1m 4s	
Uganda	"Oh Uganda, Land of Beauty"	1962	George Wilberforce Kakoma		"Oh Uganda, Land of Beauty"	0m 44s	
Ukraine	"Shche ne vmerla Ukraina" ("Ukraine's Glory Has Not Perished")	1992 (music), 2003 (lyrics)	Pavlo Chubynsky	Mykhaylo Verbytsky	"Shche ne vmerla Ukrainy"	1m 20s	
United Arab Emirates	"Ishy Biladi" ("Long Live my Homeland")	1971, 1986 (with lyrics)	Arif Al Sheikh Abdullah Al Hassan	Saad Abdel Wahab	"Ishy Bilady"	0m 48s	
United Kingdom	"God Save the King" (Note: Royal anthem in a number of Commonwealth realms, including the United Kingdom, but no official status as national anthem, except in New Zealand.) (Note: Anthems of the Countries of the United Kingdom (England, Scotland, Wales and Northern Ireland), sometimes described as "national anthems", are not listed here. As non-sovereign states, they are listed at List of regional anthems.)	1745 de facto (never adopted de jure)	Unknown	Unknown	"God Save the King"	1m 3s	
United States	"The Star-Spangled Banner"	1931	Francis Scott Key	John Stafford Smith	"The Star-Spangled Banner"	1m 18s	
Uruguay	"Himno Nacional" ("National Anthem")	1833	Francisco Acuña de Figueroa	Francisco José Debali	"Himno Nacional"	4m 30s	
Uzbekistan	"Oʻzbekiston Respublikasining Davlat Madhiyasi" ("National Anthem of the Republic of Uzbekistan")	1991	Abdulla Aripov	Mutal Burhanov	"Oʻzbekiston Respublikasining Davlat Madhiyasi"	2m 29s	
Vanuatu	"Yumi, Yumi, Yumi" ("We, We, We")	1980	François Vincent Ayssav		"Yumi, Yumi, Yumi"	0m 59s	
Vatican City	"Marche Pontificale" ("Pontifical Anthem and March")	1949	Antonio Allegra	Charles Gounod	"Marche Pontificale"	3m 13s	
Venezuela	"Gloria al Bravo Pueblo" ("Glory to the Brave People")	1881	Vicente Salias	Juan José Landaeta	"Gloria al Bravo Pueblo"	1m 31s	
Vietnam	"Tiến Quân Ca" ("Marching Song")	1976	Văn Cao		"Tiến Quân Ca"	1m 12s	
Yemen	"National anthem of Yemen"	1990	Abdallah Abdulwahab Noman	Ayoob Tarish	"National anthem of Yemen"	0m 49s	
Zambia	"Stand and Sing of Zambia, Proud and Free"	1973	collectively	Enoch Sontonga	"National anthem of Zambia"	1m 57s	
Zimbabwe	"Simudzai Mureza WeZimbabwe" ("O Lift High the Banner of Zimbabwe")	1994	Solomon Mutswairo	Fred Changundega	"Simudzai Mureza wedu WeZimbabwe"	0m 46s	

== Partially recognized states ==
State (Note: This list is for those who have declared independence and are partially recognized.)	National anthem	Date adopted	Lyricist	Officially known as	Composer	Audio	Ref.
Abkhazia	"Aiaaira" ("Victory")	2007	Genady Alamiya	"State Anthem of the Republic of Abkhazia"	Valera Çkaduwa	"Aiaaira"	
Kosovo	"Europe"	2008	Mendi Mengjiqi	"Anthem of the Republic of Kosovo"	Mendi Mengjiqi	"Europe"	
Northern Cyprus	"İstiklâl Marşı" ("Independence March")	1983	Mehmet Akif Ersoy	"The Turkish Cypriot State Anthem"	Zeki Üngör	"İstiklâl Marşı"	
Sahrawi Arab Democratic Republic	"Yā Banī al-Ṣaḥrāʼ" ("O Sons of the Sahara")	1976	unknown	"National Anthem of the Sahrawi Arab Democratic Republic"	unknown	"Ya Bani al-Sahra'"	
Somaliland	"Samo ku waar" ("Live in Eternal Peace")	1997	Hassan Sheikh Mumin	"Samo Ku Waar, Somaliland"	Hassan Sheikh Mumin	"Samo ku waar"	
South Ossetia	"Warzon Iryston!" ("Beloved Ossetia!")	1995	Totradz Kokayev	"State Anthem of the Republic of South Ossetia"	Feliks Alborov	"Warzon Iryston!"	
Sovereign Military Order of Malta (Note: The Sovereign Military Order of Malta is a sovereign entity under international law with partial recognition.)	"Ave Crux Alba" ("Hail Thou White Cross")	1930	Alfredo Consorti	"Anthem of the Sovereign Order of Malta"	Alfredo Consorti		
Taiwan	"San Min Chu-i" ("Song of the Three Principles of the People") (Note: "National Banner Song" is used as the alternate state anthem for Taiwan at international sporting events such as the Olympic Games and World Baseball Classic.)	1937 (de facto); 1943 (de jure)	Sun Yat-sen	"National Anthem of the Republic of China" (Note: The official state name of Taiwan is the "Republic of China".)	Cheng Maoyun	"San Min Zhu Yi"	
Transnistria	"My slavim tebia, Pridnestrovie" ("We glorify you, Pridnestrovie")	2000	Boris Parmenov, Vitaly Pishenko, Nikolay Bozhko	"We chant thy praises of Pridnestrovia"	Boris Alexandrov	"My slavim tebia"	

== See also ==
- List of former national anthems
- List of regional anthems
- Anthems of the autonomous communities of Spain
- List of U.S. state songs
- Anthems of the Soviet Republics
- Anthem of Europe
- Personal anthem
- Earth anthem
- Olympic Hymn
