= National symbols of Madagascar =

The national symbols of Madagascar are official and unofficial flags, icons, or cultural expressions that are emblematic, representative, or otherwise characteristic of Madagascar and of its culture.

== Symbols ==
Symbol	Name	Image	Notes
National flag	Flag of Madagascar		The Menabe Kingdom was the first to adopt the colors white and red. Later, the Merina Kingdom used them with their rulers' names in red lettering. Following its independence in 1958, Madagascar adopted a flag that is still used today, with white, red, and green stripes, which were added to represent the coastal regions.
Emblem	National seal of the Republic of Madagascar		The emblem features an outline map of the island at the center, and below it, the head of a zebu. Colors used are red, green, yellow, black, and white. Green and red rays emanate from the map, making it look like the sun. In Malagasy, the upper part bears the official name of the country (Republic of Madagascar), and at the base bears the national motto: Love – Fatherland – Progress.
National anthem	Ry Tanindrazanay malala ô!		Adopted in 1959, the lyrics were written by Pastor Rahajason, and the music by Norbert Raharisoa. It is similar to a march and was strongly influenced by European music and the French colonial education system. It is often played by Malagasy musicians on the accordion.
National tree	Grandidier's baobab (Adansonia grandidieri)		Adansonia grandidieri is the biggest and most famous of Madagascar's six species of baobabs. The local name is renala or reniala (from Malagasy: reny ala, meaning "mother of the forest"). This tree is endemic to the island, where it is an endangered species threatened by the encroachment of agricultural land. This is the tree found at the Avenue of the Baobabs.
National tree	Traveller's tree (Ravenala madagascariensis)		Ravenala madagascariensis is the sole known species from the Ravenala genus, named after "leaves of the forest" in Malagasy. It gets its popular name from its distinctive fan-shaped leaves, with a cup-shaped base that gathers rainfall, which is used by travelers to relieve thirst.
National animal	Ring-tailed lemur (Lemur catta)		Like all lemurs, the ring-tailed lemur is endemic to Madagascar, where it is endangered. Known locally in Malagasy as maky, it ranges from gallery forests to spiny scrub in the southern regions.
National animal	Zebu (Bos indicus)		There are many Malagasy proverbs, popular sayings, and idioms about the importance of these animals in the Malagasy culture. Men also wrestle zebus in a competitive courting rite known as Savika.
National bird	Madagascar Fish Eagle (Icthyophaga vociferoides)		This sea eagle species is endemic, and it survives in low numbers along the northwest coast north of Morondava. The range of this threatened eagle is within the Madagascar dry deciduous forests.

== See also ==
- Royal poinciana (Delonix regia)
