= Xiao He (composer) =

Chinese musician best known for composing the Guinea-Bissauan national anthem

Xiao He 晓河
- Born: 何同鉴 c. February 1918
- Origin: Shangrao, Jiangxi, China
- Died: 8 September 2010 (aged 92)
- Occupation: Composer

Xiao He
- Simplified Chinese: 晓河
- Traditional Chinese: 曉河
Transcriptions
Standard Mandarin
- Hanyu Pinyin: xiǎo hé
- Wade–Giles: hsiao3 ho2

He Tongjian, also known as Xiao He (Note: Chinese: 晓河; pinyin: Xiǎo Hé; Mandarin pronunciation: [ɕjàʊ.xɤ́])) (February 1918 – 8 September 2010), was a Chinese composer from Shangrao, Jiangxi, and a lifetime honorary medal winner of the first Chinese Music Golden Bell Award. He is most notable for composing the melody of the Guinea-Bissauan national anthem, "Esta É a Nossa Pátria Amada".

== Biography ==
Xiao He was born in February 1918 in the city of Shangrao in Jiangxi, a province in Southern China. He started his apprenticeship at the age of 14. He took part in the Anti-Japanese Movement in February 1938, joined the People's Liberation Army and the Chinese Communist Party the following year, and enlisted in the New Fourth Army in February 1940. He has successively served as an officer in the Literature and Art Department of the Ministry of Culture, a composer on the Art Troupe of the Political Department, the director of the Academic Affairs Office of the PLA Academy of Art, director of cadre training, and the second and third directors of the Chinese Musicians' Association. He fell ill and died on 8 September 2010 at the age of 92.

== Notable works ==
Some of his most notable compositions include "Luo Binghui The Shooter" (罗炳辉射击手), "Three Toasts to Relatives" (三杯美酒敬亲人), "Song of the Exploration Team" (勘探队之歌), and "The Great Country and the Great Party" (伟大的国家伟大的党).

=== National Anthem of Guinea-Bissau ===
In 1963, a delegation from then Portuguese Guinea visited China and listened to music composed by Xiao He. Anti-colonial political leader Amílcar Cabral asked Xiao to compose a piece that would inspire his people in their struggle for independence. Set to a 1963 poem by Cabral, the melody of his composition was adopted by the African Party for the Independence of Guinea and Cape Verde (PAIGC) as the national anthem of Guinea-Bissau and Cape Verde upon their joint independence from Portugal in 1974, titled "Esta É a Nossa Pátria Amada" (This is Our Beloved Homeland).

In the 1990s, after the PAIGC allowed multi-party rule, it was decided that Cape Verde should adopt its own national symbols, including a flag and anthem. A new anthem, "Cântico da Liberdade", was adopted for Cape Verde in 1996.
