= Mlungu dalitsani Malaŵi =

National anthem of Malawi

Mulungu dalitsani Malaŵi
English: O God Bless Our Land of Malawi
- National anthem of Malawi
- Lyrics: Michael-Fredrick Paul Sauka, 1964
- Music: Michael-Fredrick Paul Sauka, 1964
- Adopted: 1964

Audio sample
- U.S. Navy Band instrumental version (one verse): file; help

"Mlungu dalitsani Malaŵi" (Chichewa pronunciation: [mɽuᵑɡu ɗaɽit͡sani maɽaβi]; sometimes written "Mulungu"; English: "O God Bless Our Land of Malawi") or "Chiuta dangililani Malaŵi" is the national anthem of Malawi. It was written and composed by Michael-Fredrick Paul Sauka and adopted in 1964 as a result of a competition.

== History ==
In the lead up to independence in 1964, a competition to find a national anthem was held. Entries were received from Europe, the US and many African countries. Malawian Michael-Fredrick Paul Sauka submitted four entries to the competition. Sauka was a member of the Nyasaland Audit Department and a part-time music teacher at St. Mary's Girl's Secondary School in Zomba. He was also the organist of Zomba's Roman Catholic church. One of his entries was chosen as the winner and adopted as the national anthem.

== Lyrics ==
Chicheŵa lyrics

I
Mlungu dalitsani Malaŵi,
Mumsunge m'mtendere.
Gonjetsani adani onse,
Njala, nthenda, nsanje.
Lunzitsani mitima yathu,
Kuti tisaope.
Mdalitse Mtsogoleri nafe,
Ndi Mayi Malaŵi.

II
Malaŵi ndziko lokongola,
La chonde ndi ufulu,
Nyanja ndi mphepo ya m'mapiri,
Ndithudi tadala.
Zigwa, mapiri, nthaka, dzinthu,
N'mphatso zaulere.
Nkhalango, madambo abwino.
Ngwokoma Malaŵi.

III
O Ufulu tigwirizane,
Kukweza Malaŵi.
Ndi chikondi, khama, kumvera,
Timutumikire.
Pa nkhondo nkana pa mtendere,
Cholinga n'chimodzi.
Mayi, bambo, tidzipereke,
Pokweza Malaŵi.

Chicheŵa IPA transcription (Note: See Help:IPA and Chewa language § Phonology.)

1
[mɽu.ᵑɡu ɗa.ɽi.t͡sa.ni ma.ɽa.βi]
[mu.su.ᵑɡɛ‿m.mtɛ.ⁿdɛ.ɽɛ]
[gɔ.ⁿd͡ʒɛ.t͡sa.ni a.ɗa.ni ɔ.ⁿsɛ]
[ⁿd͡ʒa.ɽa ⁿtʰɛ.ⁿda ⁿsa.ⁿd͡ʒɛ]
[ɽu.ⁿzi.t͡sa.ni mi.ti.ma ja.tʰu]
[ku.ti ti.sa.ɔ.pɛ]
[mɗa.ɽi.t͡sɛ mt͡sɔ.gɔ.ɽɛ.ɽi na.fɛ]
[ⁿdi ma.ji ma.ɽa.βi]

2
[ma.ɽa.βi ⁿd͡zi.kɔ ɽɔ.kɔ.ᵑɡɔ.ɽa]
[ɽa t͡ʃɔ.ⁿdɛ ⁿdi u.fu.ɽu]
[nʲa.ⁿd͡ʒa ⁿdi ᵐpʰɛ.pɔ ja‿m.ma.pi.ɽi]
[ⁿdi.tʰu.ɗi ta.ɗa.ɽa]
[zi.gʷa ma.pi.ɽi ⁿtʰa.ka d͡zi.ⁿtʰu]
[nᵐpʰa.t͡sɔ za.u.ɽɛ.ɽɛ]
[ᵑkʰa.ɽa.ᵑɡɔ ma.da.ᵐbɔ aɓʷi.nɔ]
[ᵑgʷɔ.kɔ.ma ma.ɽa.βi]

3
[ɔ u.fu.ɽu ti.gʷi.ɽi.za.nɛ]
[ku.kʷɛ.za ma.ɽa.βi]
[ⁿdi t͡ʃi.kɔ.ⁿdi kʰa.ma ku.mvɛ.ɽa]
[ti.mu.tu.mi.ki.ɽɛ]
[pa ᵑkʰɔ.ⁿdɔ ᵑka.na pa‿m.tɛ.ⁿdɛ.ɽɛ]
[t͡ʃɔ.ɽi.ᵑɡa‿n.t͡ʃi.mɔ.d͡zi]
[ma.ji ba.ᵐbɔ ti.d͡zi.pɛ.ɽɛ.kɛ]
[pɔ.kʷɛ.za ma.ɽa.βi]

ChiTumbuka lyrics

I
Chiuta watumbike Malaŵi,
Mupani mtende.
Mutonde ŵalwani ŵinu wose,
Njara, matenda, na sanji.
Nozgekerani mitima yithu,
Kuti tileke kopa.
Mutumbikani Mulongozgi withu pamoza na ise,
Mwanakazi uyu wakaŵa wa ku Malawi.

II
Malaŵi ni caru cakutowa comene.
Kuŵa wakufwatuka,
Nyanja na mphepo za mu mapiri,
Nakuti ndimo viliri nadi.
Viliŵa, mapiri, malo, vinthu,
Ni vyawanangwa.
Nkhorongo, malo ghawemi ghakuliskako viŵeto.
Malawi ni malo ghawemi comene.

III
O wanangwa tiye tiwunganenge,
Kukwezga Malaŵi.
Mwa kutemwa, kulimbikira, kupulikira,
Muteŵeterani.
Mu nyengo ya nkhondo na mtende wuwo,
Pali cilato cimoza.
Amama, adada, tiyeni tijipeleke,
Kuwuska Malaŵi.

English lyrics

I
O God bless our land of Malawi,
Keep it a land of peace.
Put down each and every enemy,
Hunger, disease, envy.
Join together all our hearts as one,
That we be free from fear.
Bless our leader, each and every one,
And Mother Malawi.

II
Our own Malawi, this land so fair,
Fertile and brave and free.
With its lakes, refreshing mountain air,
How greatly blest are we.
Hills and valleys, soil so rich and rare
Give us a bounty free.
Wood and forest, plains so broad and fair,
All - beauteous Malawi.

III
Freedom ever, let us all unite
To build up Malawi.
With our love, our zeal and loyalty,
Bringing our best to her.
In time of war, or in time of peace,
One purpose and one goal.
Men and women serving selflessly
In building Malawi.
