= Le Lion rouge =

National anthem of Senegal

Le Lion rouge Gayndeg sibi xiiru na
English: The Red Lion
- National anthem of Senegal
- Also known as: "Pincez tous vos koras, frappez les balafons" or "Yëngalleen kooraa yi, te jiin ndënd yi" (English: "Everyone strum your koras, strike the balafons")
- Lyrics: Léopold Sédar Senghor, 1960
- Music: Herbert Pepper, 1960
- Adopted: 1960

Audio sample
- U.S. Navy Band instrumental version (one verse and chorus): file; help

"Le Lion rouge" (Wolof: Gayndeg sibi xiiru na; English: "The Red Lion"), more commonly known by its incipit "Pincez tous vos koras, frappez les balafons" (Wolof: Yëngalleen kooraa yi, te jiin ndënd yi; English: "Everyone strum your koras, strike the balafons") is the national anthem of Senegal. Written by Léopold Sédar Senghor, the first president of Senegal, it was adopted in 1960.

== Development ==
The lyrics were written by Léopold Sédar Senghor, Senegal's first president, while the music is composed by Frenchman Herbert Pepper, who also composed the national anthem of the Central African Republic, "La Renaissance". The kora (a type of harp) and balafon (wooden xylophone) are traditional Senegalese musical instruments.

== Lyrics ==
French

Pincez tous vos koras, frappez les balafons.
Le lion rouge a rugi.
Le dompteur de la brousse
D'un bond s'est élancé,
Dissipant les ténèbres.
Soleil sur nos terreurs, soleil sur notre espoir.
Debout, frères, voici l'Afrique rassemblée.

Refrain:
Fibres de mon cœur vert.
Épaule contre épaule, mes plus que frères,
O Sénégalais, debout !
Unissons la mer et les sources, unissons la steppe et la forêt !
Salut Afrique mère.

Sénégal toi le fils de l'écume du lion,
Toi surgi de la nuit au galop des chevaux,
Rend-nous, oh ! rends-nous l'honneur de nos ancêtres,
Splendides comme ébène et forts comme le muscle
Nous disons droits - l'épée n'a pas une bavure.

Refrain

Sénégal, nous faisons nôtre ton grand dessein :
Rassembler les poussins à l'abri des milans
Pour en faire, de l'est à l'ouest, du nord au sud,
Dressé, un même peuple, un peuple sans couture
Mais un peuple tourné vers tous les vents du monde.

Refrain

Sénégal, comme toi, comme tous nos héros,
Nous serons durs sans haine et des deux bras ouverts.
L'épée, nous la mettrons dans la paix du fourreau,
Car le travail sera notre arme et la parole.
Le Bantou est un frère, et l'Arabe et le Blanc.

Refrain

Mais que si l'ennemi incendie nos frontières
Nous serons tous dressés et les armes au poing :
Un peuple dans sa foi défiant tous les malheurs,
Les jeunes et les vieux, les hommes et les femmes.
La mort, oui ! Nous disons la mort, mais pas la honte.

Refrain

English translation

Everyone strum your koras, strike the balafons.
The red lion has roared.
The tamer of the savannah
Has leapt forward,
Dispelling the darkness.
Sunlight on our terrors, sunlight on our hope.
Stand up, brothers, here is Africa assembled.

Refrain:
Fibres of my green heart,
Shoulder to shoulder, my more-than-brothers,
O Senegalese, arise!
Join sea and springs, join steppe and forest!
Hail mother Africa.

Senegal, you the son of the lion's froth,
Sprung from the night to the gallop of horses,
Give us, oh! give us the honour of our ancestors,
Splendid as ebony and strong as muscle,
We say it clearly – the sword has no flaw.

Refrain

Senegal, we take on your great work:
To shelter the chicks from the falcons,
To make, from east to west, north to south,
Arisen, one single people, a people without seams,
But a people turned to all the winds of the earth.

Refrain

Senegal, like you, like all our heroes,
We will be hard without hatred, with two open arms.
The sword in peace-time we will store in the scabbard,
For work and words will be our weapon.
The Bantu is a brother, and so is the Arab and the White.

Refrain

But if the enemy burns our borders
We will be risen with weapons in our hands:
One people defying all sorrows with its faith,
Young and old, men and women.
Death, yes! We say death, but not shame.

Refrain

Wolof

Yëngalleen kooraa yi, te jiin ndënd yi.
Gayndeg sibi xiiru na
Ki doon rëbb ci àll bi
Dafa tëb ci kanam,
Tëb daal di dal, Dindi lépp lu lëndëmoon.
Doon jant ci sunuy njàqare, doon jant ci sunu yaakar.
Jógleen, bokk yi, Afrig booloo na

Awu:
Wuumi sama xol bu nëtëx bii!
Mbagg ak mbagg, yeen samay bokk,
Ô saa-senegal, jógleen!
Nanu boole géej yi ak siyaan yi, nanu boole joor gi ak ñaay bi!
Mucc ñeel Afrig sunu yaay.

Senegaal yaw doomi gayndeg sibi,
Yaw mi jóg ci guddi di njaabal i fas,
Delloo nu, oh! Dello nu ngalla njàmbaarug sunu maam ya,
Taaru ni njalabaan dëgër këcc ni sidit.
Noo ngi wax jub xocc - jaasi ji amul lenn ngaañ.

Awu

Senegaal, def nanu sunu mbir sa yéene ju kawe:
Dajale cuuj yi ngir làq leen jaxaay yi
Ngir def leen, li ko dale penku jëm sowu, bëj-gànnaar jàpp bëj-saalum,
Taxaw temm, doon wenn askan, askan wu dul teqalikoo,
Waaye askan wu wëlbatiku jëm ci mbooleem ngelawi àddina si

Awu

Senegaal, niki yaw, niki mbooleem sunu jàmbaar yi,
Dinanu dëgër këcc te du ànd ak mbañeel boole ko ak tijji sunu ñaari yoxo.
Jaasi ji, dinanu ko roof ci biir mbarum jàmm.
Ndax kat liggéey mooy doon sunu ngànnaay ak sunu kàddu.
Bàntu bi sunu mbokk la, ak Araab bi ak ku Weex ki.

Awu

Waaye nag bu noon bi taalee sunuy dig
Dinanu taxaw jonn nag ŋàbb sunuy ngànnaay:
Wenn askan ci pas-pasu jàmmaarloo ak lépp luy tiis,
Ndaw ñi ak mag ñi, góor ñi ak jigéen ñi.
Dee, waaw! Dee lanu wax, waaye mukk ci ag toroxtaange.

Awu
