= Said Al Muzayin =

Palestinian poet (1935–1991)

- سعيد المزين
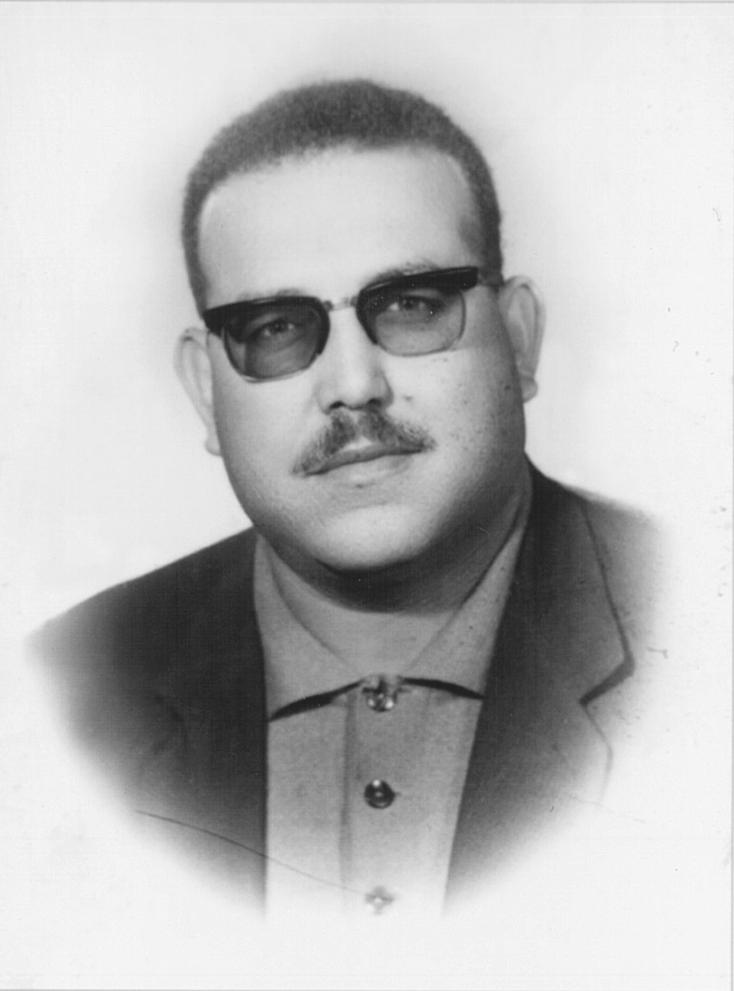
- Born: 1935; Ashdod, Palestine (now Israel)
- Died: 29 March 1991 (aged 55–56); Riyadh, Saudi Arabia
- Occupations: History teacher, politician, poet
- Organization: Palestine Liberation Organization
- Known for: Writing the lyrics for the national anthem of Palestine

Said Al Muzayin (Arabic: سعيد المزين, IPA: [saˈʕiːd al‿mʊzajˈjan]; 1935 – 29 March 1991) was a Palestinian poet who wrote the lyrics of the Palestinian national anthem.

== Early life and education ==
Al Muyazin was born in 1935 in Ashdod, Mandatory Palestine, where he was also educated. In 1948, after the Nakba, he migrated to the Gaza Strip, which was occupied by Egypt.

== Career ==
In Gaza, he operated a printing press, and was arrested by Israelis, before taking part in the early resistance movement in 1956. He later worked as a history teacher, moving in 1957 to Saudi Arabia to teach there. In 1959, he flew to Damascus to work in the Palestinian Liberation Organisation.

From 1973 to 1978, he was representative of the Palestinian National Liberation Movement in Saudi Arabia.

At an unknown date he wrote the lyrics of "Fida'i", a song set to music by the composer Ali Ismael that in 1996 was made the Palestinian National Anthem by the PLO.

=== Selected literary works ===
- "I'm Steadfast", poem, c. 1970
- "Tubas", poem
- "Safar al-Saif", poem
- "فدائية" (Fedayeen), poem
- في خندق الأخلاق (In the Trench of Ethics), book
- Essays on the Revolution, book, Cairo, 1986
- Safar al-Fath, collection of poems
- A People Will Not Die, play
- The House of Our Father, play
- Al-Mawda, play
- "وثيقة الدماء" ("The Document of Blood"), story
- "الدورية 96" ("The Patrol 96")

== Death ==
Al Muzayin died in Riyadh, Saudi Arabia, on 29 March 1991.
