= Matila Balekana =

Fijian-born Solomon Islander co-writer of its national anthem (born 1932)

- Born: 1932 (age 93–94); Colony of Fiji, British Empire
- Occupation: Songwriter
- Spouse: Panapasa Balekana
- Children: 2

Matila Baleilekutu Balekana (born 1932) is a Fijian-born Solomon Islander, who co-wrote the national anthem of the Solomon Islands with her husband, Panapasa Balekana.

Matila Balekana is originally from Fiji, but has spent the majority of her adult life in the Solomon Islands. She and her husband had two children together, a son and a daughter.

The couple co-wrote the national anthem of the Solomon Islands, "God Save Our Solomon Islands", as part of a government competition. Matila and Panapasa co-wrote the lyrics to the anthem, while Balekana Balekana composed the music exclusively.

Matila Balekana's husband, Panapasa Balekana, died on 22 January 2009 at their home in Henderson, east of Honiara.
