= Ferdinand Samuel Laur =

Swiss composer of Lesotho's national anthem (1791–1854)

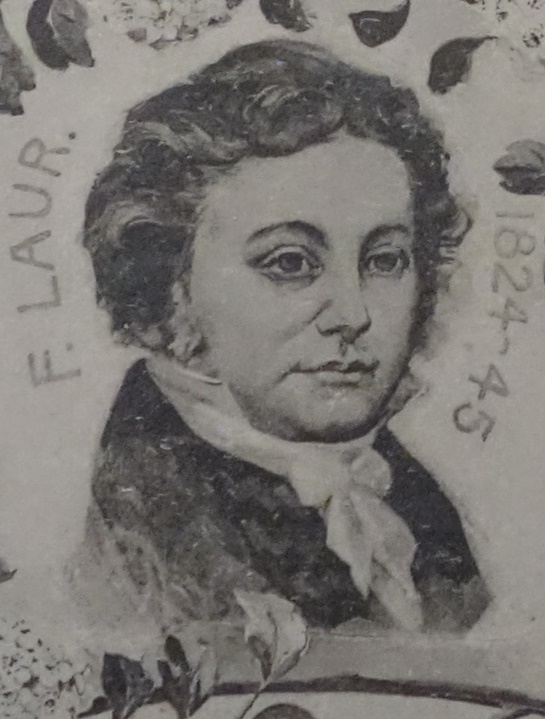
Portrait of Laur from a card commemorating the 75th anniversary of the Basler Gesangverein

Ferdinand Samuel Laur (22 February 1791 – 2 July 1854) was a Swiss composer, conductor, choirmaster, and music teacher. He founded the Basel Choral Society in 1824. A hymnal he composed that was published in 1820 is now used in the national anthem of Lesotho, "Lesotho Fatse La Bontata Rona".

== Career ==
"Freiheit" (transl. "Freedom"), a hymn he composed that was published in 1820 is now used in the national anthem of Lesotho, "Lesotho Fatse La Bontata Rona". Between 1830 and 1840 he published the hymnbook Vierstimmige Chorgesänge und Chorlieder ohne Begleitung für Sopran, Alt, Tenor und Bass, für Kirchen, Schulen und Singanstalten.

He founded the Basel Choral Society in 1824.

== Death ==
Laur died in Egelshofen, near Kreuzlingen, Switzerland.

== Personal life ==
Laur had a grandson, Ernst Ferdinand Laur.
