= Lesotho Fatse La Bontata Rona =

National anthem of Lesotho

Lesotho fatše la bo-ntat'a rona
English: Lesotho, Land of Our Fathers
- National anthem of Lesotho
- Lyrics: Joshua Pulumo Mohapeloa (current lyrics), François Coillard and Adolphe Mabille (original lyrics)
- Music: Ferdinand Samuel Laur, 1820
- Adopted: 1 June 1967; 58 years ago

Audio sample
- U.S. Navy Band instrumental version: file; help

"Lesotho fatše la bo-ntat'a rona" (English: "Lesotho, Land of Our Fathers") is the national anthem of Lesotho. The lyrics were written by French missionary François Coillard and Swiss missionary Adolphe Mabille, and the music is taken from an 1820 hymnal composed by Swiss composer Ferdinand Samuel Laur. It was officially adopted as the national anthem in 1967. The original composition that the national anthem was based on had five verses, though only the first and last ended up being adopted.

== History ==
The song was written by French missionaries François Coillard and Adolphe Mabille and set to the tune of the 1820 hymnal "Freiheit" (English: "Freedom") by Swiss composer Ferdinand-Samuel Laur. It was introduced around 1869 as part of a collection of hymns and work songs. This was immediately after the third and final Free State–Basotho War (1867–1868), and the lyrics encouraged the Basotho to accept the borders defined in the 1869 Convention of Aliwal North between Britain and the Boer Free State, which ended the war.

The song is first known to have been performed at a party work party for Basotho chief Molapo in 1870. Originally sung by field workers, by the 1900s, mission schools run by the Paris Evangelical Mission Society had begun teaching the song to their students. Over time, the song became abbreviated, and only the first and fifth (last) verses began to be taught. The missionaries also organised public performances of the song by their students on special occasions.

The song gained de facto use in important functions in the early 20th century, commonly being sung after "God Save the Queen", and was already being referred to as the national anthem by the 1940s. A version including the first and last verses, shortened by choral composer Joshua Pulumo Mohapeloa, was declared the official anthem of Lesotho on 1 June 1967, just over a year after independence on 4 October 1966.

== Lyrics ==
=== Current lyrics ===
Sesotho lyrics

I
Lesotho fatše la bo-ntat'a rona;
Har'a mafatše le letle ke lona;
Ke moo re hlahileng,
Ke moo re holileng,
Rea le rata.

II
Molimo ak'u boloke Lesotho,
U felise lintoa le matšoenyeho;
Oho fatše lena;
La bo-ntat'a rona;
Le be le khotso.

IPA transcription (Note: See Help:IPA, Sesotho orthography § Sotho alphabet and Sotho phonology.)

1
[lɪ.sʊ.tʰʊ fɑ.t͡sʰɪ lɑ bɔn.tʼɑ.tʼɑ ʀʊ.nɑ]
[hɑ.ʀɑ mɑ.fɑ.t͡sʰɪ lɛ lɪ.t͡ɬʼɛ kʼɪ lɔ.nɑ]
[kʼɪ mɔ ʀɪ ɬɑ.ɦi.lɛŋ]
[kʼɪ mɔ ʀɪ ɦʊ.di.lɛŋ]
[ʀɪ.ɑ lɪ ʀɑ.tʼɑ]

2
[mʊ.di.mʊ ɑ.kʼɔ bʊ.lʊ.kʼɛ lɪ.sʊ.tʰʊ]
[ʊ fɛ.di.sɛ din.tʼʊ̯ɑ lɪ mɑ.t͡sʰʊ̯ɛ.ɲɛ.ɦɔ]
[ɔ.ɦɔ fɑ.t͡sʰɪ lɛ.nɑ]
[lɑ bɔn.tʼɑ.tʼɑ ʀʊ.nɑ]
[lɪ bɛ lɪ kʰɔ.t͡sʼɔ]

English translation

I
Lesotho, land of our Fathers,
Among the lands she is the most beautiful.
She is where we were born,
She is where we grew up,
We love her.

II
God, please protect Lesotho.
Spare it conflict and tribulation,
Oh, this land,
Land of our Fathers,
May it have peace.

=== Original lyrics ===
Sesotho lyrics

I
Lesotho fatše la bo-ntat'a rona,
Har'a mafatše le letle ke lona;
Ke moo re hlahileng,
Ke moo re holileng,
Rea le rata,

II
Leha ba bang ba re le lenyenyane,
Ho rona le leholo, le lekane
Re na le masimo,
Re na le likhomo;
Ho re lekane.

III
'Me leha le hloka lintho tse ngata,
Le tse rorisoang ke tse ling lichaba,
Le na le lithaba,
Makhulo, liliba,
Lea rateha.

IV
Haholo lefatše lena la rōna,
Le se le na le taba tsa Morena;
Batho b'a rapela,
Le mekhoa e'a fela.

V
Mōlimō ak'u bōlōke Lesōthō;
U felise lintoa le matšoenyeho;
Oho fatše lena;
La bo-ntat'a rōna;
Le be le khotso.

English translation

I
Lesotho is the land of our ancestors
You are the best of the world;
That's where we were born,
That's where we grew up,
We love you,

II
Though some say she is small,
For us she is big, enough
We have fields,
We have cattle;
It is enough for us.

III
And though you need many things,
And praise from nations,
You have mountains,
Pastures, wells,
It's lovely.

IV
So much for our world
You already have the word of the Lord;
People are praying,
And the trends are coming to an end.

V
God save Lesotho;
End wars and anxieties;
Oh this earth;
Land of our fathers;
Be at peace.
