= National anthem of Palestine =

Fidāʾiyy
- فِدَائِ
- National anthem of Palestine
- Lyrics: Said Al Muzayin, 1965
- Music: Ali Ismael, 1965
- Adopted: 1996
- Preceded by: "Mawtini"

Audio sample
- Original vocal recording in D major: file; help

The national anthem of Palestine, known by its incipit as "Fidāʾiyy" (Arabic: فدائي, lit. 'Fedayeen warrior'), was officially adopted in 1996 by the Palestine Liberation Organization, replacing the Arabic patriotic song "Mawtini". It was written by Said Al Muzayin and set to music by Ali Ismael in 1965.

== Etymology ==
The word fidāʾiyy (Arabic: فدائي; plural: فدائيون fidāʾiyyūn (standard) or فدائيين fidāʾiyyīn (informal), often rendered in English as 'fedayeen') means 'sacrifice' or 'one who sacrifices himself' (a literal translation of fidāʾiyyīn might be "martyrs"). The Palestinian fedayeen are militants or guerrillas of a nationalist orientation from among the Palestinian people. Most Palestinians consider the fedayeen to be "freedom fighters".

== History ==
The anthem was adopted by the Palestine Liberation Organization in 1996, in accordance with Article 31 of the Palestinian Declaration of Independence from 1988. It replaced "Mawtini". It was written by Said Al Muzayin (a.k.a. Fata Al Thawra, "boy of the revolution"), while its music was composed by Egyptian maestro Ali Ismael. It was known as the "anthem of the Palestinian redemption".

== Lyrics ==
Arabic original

فِدَائِيّ فِدَائِيّ فِدَائِيّ (Note: Sometimes sung as بِلَادِي بِلَادِي بِلَادِي Bilādī Bilādī Bilādī /bɪ.læː.diː bɪ.læː.diː bɪ.læː.diː/ ('My country, my country, my country').)
يَا أَرْضِي يَا أَرْضَ الجُدُود
فِدَائِيّ فِدَائِيّ فِدَائِيّ
يَا شَعْبِي يَا شَعْبَ الخُلُود

كُورَال:
فِدَائِيّ فِدَائِيّ فِدَائِيّ
يَا أَرْضِي يَا أَرْضَ الجُدُود
فِدَائِيّ فِدَائِيّ فِدَائِيّ
يَا شَعْبِي يَا شَعْبَ الخُلُود

بِعَزْمِي وَنَارِي وَبُرْكَانِ ثَأرِي
وَأَشْوَاقِ دَمِّي لِأَرْضِي وَدَارِي
𝄇 صَعَدْتُ الجِبَالَ وَخُضْتُ النِّضَالَ
قَهَرْتُ المُحَالَ عَبَرْتُ الحُدُود 𝄆

كُورَال

بِعَزْمِ الرِّيَاحِ وَنَارِ السِّلَاحِ
وَإِصْرَارِ شَعْبِي بِأَرْضِ الكِفَاحِ
𝄇 فِلَسْطِينُ دَارِي وَدَرْبُ انْتِصَارِي (Note: Sometimes sung as فِلَسْطِينُ دَارِي فِلَسْطِينُ نَارِي Filasṭīnu dārī Filasṭīnu nārī /fi.las.tˤiː.nu daː.riː fi.las.tˤiː.nu naː.riː/ ('Palestine is my home, Palestine is my fire').)
فِلَسْطِينُ ثَارِي وَأَرْضُ الصُّمُود 𝄆

كُورَال

بِحَقِّ القَسَم تَحْتَ ظِلِّ العَلَم
بِأَرْضِي وَشَعْبِي وَنَارِ الأَلَم
𝄇 سَأَحْيَا فِدَائِيّ وَأَمْضِي فِدَائِيّ
وَأَقْضِي فِدَائِيّ إِلَى أَن تَعُود 𝄆

كُورَال

Romanization of Arabic

Fidāʾiyy Fidāʾiyy Fidāʾiyy
Yā ʾarḍī yā ʾarḍa l-judūd
Fidāʾiyy Fidāʾiyy Fidāʾiyy
Yā šaʿbī yā šaʿba l-xulūd

Kūrāl:
Fidāʾiyy Fidāʾiyy Fidāʾiyy
Yā ʾarḍī yā ʾarḍa l-judūd
Fidāʾiyy Fidāʾiyy Fidāʾiyy
Yā šaʿbī yā šaʿba l-xulūd

Bi-ʿazmī wa-nārī wa-burkāni ṯārī
Wa-ʾašwāqi dammī li-ʾarḍī wa-dārī
𝄆 Ṣaʿadtu l-jibāla wa-xuḍtu n-niḍāla
Qahartu l-muḥāla ʿabartu l-ḥudūd 𝄇

Kūrāl

Bi-ʿazmi r-riyāḥi wa-nāri s-silāḥi
Wa-ʾiṣrāri šaʿbī bi-ʾarḍi l-kifāḥi
𝄆 Filasṭīnu dārī wa-darbu ntiṣārī
Filasṭīnu ṯārī wa-ʾarḍu ṣ-ṣumūd 𝄇

Kūrāl

Bi-ḥaqqi l-qasam taḥta ẓilli l-ʿalam
Bi-ʾarḍī wa-šaʿbī wa-nāri l-ʾalam
𝄆 Sa-ʾaḥyā fidāʾiyy wa-ʾamḍī fidāʾiyy
Wa-ʾaqḍī fidāʾiyy ʾilā ʾan taʿūd 𝄇

𝄆 Kūrāl 𝄇

IPA transcription (Note: See Help:IPA/Arabic and Palestinian Arabic.)

/fi.daː.ʔijj fi.daː.ʔijj fi.daː.ʔijj/
/jaː ʔar.dˤiː jaː ʔar.dˤa‿l.ʒu.duːd/
/fi.daː.ʔijj fi.daː.ʔijj fi.daː.ʔijj/
/jaː ʃaʕ.biː jaː ʃaʕ.ba‿l.xu.luːd/

Chorus:
/fi.daː.ʔijj fi.daː.ʔijj fi.daː.ʔijj/
/jaː ʔar.dˤiː jaː ʔar.dˤa‿l.ʒu.duːd/
/fi.daː.ʔijj fi.daː.ʔijj fi.daː.ʔijj/
/jaː ʃaʕ.biː jaː ʃaʕ.ba‿l.xu.luːd/

/bi.ʕaz.miː wa.naː.riː wa.bur.kaː.ni θaː.riː/
/wa.ʔaʃ.waː.qi dam.miː li.ʔar.dˤiː wa.daː.riː/
𝄆 /sˤa.ʕad.tu‿l.ʒi.baː.la wa.xudˤ.tu‿n.ni.dˤaː.la/
/qa.har.tu‿l.mu.ħaː.la ʕa.bar.tu‿l.ħu.duːd/ 𝄇

Chorus

/bi.ʕaz.mi‿r.ri.jaː.ħi wa.naː.ri‿s.si.laː.ħi/
/wa.ʔisˤ.raː.ri ʃaʕ.biː bi.ʔardˤi‿l.ki.faː.ħi/
𝄆 /fi.las.tˤiː.nu daː.riː wa.dar.bu‿n.ti.sˤaː.riː/
/fi.las.tˤiː.nu θaː.riː wa.ʔar.dˤu‿sˤ.sˤu.muːd/ 𝄇

Chorus

/bi.ħaq.qi‿l.qa.sam taħ.ta ðˤil.li‿l.ʕa.lam/
/bi.ʔar.dˤiː wa.ʃaʕ.biː wa.naː.ri‿l.ʔa.lam/
𝄆 /sa.ʔaħ.jaː fi.daː.ʔijj wa.ʔam.dˤiː fi.daː.ʔijj/
/wa.ʔaq.dˤiː fi.daː.ʔijj ʔi.laː ʔan ta.ʕuːd/ 𝄇

𝄆 Chorus 𝄇

English translation

Warrior, warrior, warrior,
Oh my land, the land of the ancestors
Warrior, warrior, warrior,
Oh my people, people of eternity

Chorus:
Warrior, warrior, warrior,
Oh my land, the land of the ancestors
Warrior, warrior, warrior,
Oh my people, people of eternity

With my determination, my fire and the volcano of my vendetta
With the longing in my blood for my land and my home
𝄆 I have climbed the mountains and fought the wars
I have conquered the impossible, and crossed the frontiers 𝄇

Chorus

With the resolve of the winds and the fire of the weapons
And the determination of my nation in the land of struggle
𝄆 Palestine is my home, and the path of my triumphal
Palestine is my vendetta and the land of withstanding 𝄇

Chorus

By the oath under the shade of the flag
By my land and nation, and the fire of pain
𝄆 I will live as a warrior, I will remain a warrior,
I will die as a warrior – until my country returns 𝄇

𝄆 Chorus 𝄇

== See also ==
- Mawtini (Ibrahim Tuqan song), the national anthem of Iraq and former, unofficial national anthem of Palestine
