= Forged from the Love of Liberty =

National anthem of Trinidad and Tobago

- National anthem of Trinidad and Tobago
- Lyrics: Patrick Castagne, 19 August 1962
- Music: Patrick Castagne, 19 August 1962
- Adopted: 31 August 1962

Audio sample
- US Navy Band instrumental version: file; help

"Forged from the Love of Liberty" is the national anthem of the Trinidad and Tobago. Originally composed as the national anthem for the short-lived West Indies Federation (1958–1962), this song was edited and adopted by Trinidad and Tobago when it became independent in 1962. It was written and composed by Patrick Castagne.

== History ==
Patrick Castagne, a renowned West Indian songwriter, was employed at the Trinidad and Tobago Commission in London. One of his compositions, called "A Song for the Islands" or "A Song for Federation", was submitted to the West Indies Federation as a possible anthem. Castagne's "A Song for Federation" provided the musical inspiration that could have matched the foundation of a strong federation had it survived. The close resemblance between the national anthem of Trinidad and Tobago and "A Song for Federation" can be seen from the lyrics of the latter, as follows:

Forged from the love of unity
In the fires of hope and prayer
With boundless faith in our destiny
West Indians all declare:

Side by side we stand
With our hearts joined across the sea
This our native land
We pledge ourselves for thee.

𝄆 Here every creed and race find an equal place,
And may God bless our nation. 𝄇

When the Federation collapsed, he changed some of the lines and resubmitted the song to Trinidad and Tobago for the competition to choose its national anthem. In total, the competition received 834 word-only entries, 33 music-only entries and 306 entries with both words and music. Castagne's submission came out on top, and he won the prize of $5,000.00 in government bonds and a gold medal inscribed with the coat of arms of Trinidad and Tobago.

Castagne's alteration of "A Song for Federation" was deemed to be most suitable for a twin-island state that consisted of "islands of the blue Caribbean Sea" standing "side by side" in promoting the values of "every creed and race" finding "an equal place" in the multi-racial, multi-religious and multi-cultural society of Trinidad and Tobago as it existed in 1962. It was considered to have reflected the nature and the strength of the people of Trinidad and Tobago and their courage as one nation working towards living in unity despite the existing diversity. According to the editorial in the Sunday Guardian of 19 August 1962:

In its solemn declaration of brotherhood and unity, it very neatly includes Tobago with Trinidad without mentioning the name of either ("Side by side we stand, islands of the blue Caribbean Sea"); and as an added impulse to unity it goes on to describe them together as "our native land," ending with the petition, "And may God bless our nation."

== Lyrics ==
Forged from the love of liberty
In the fires of hope and prayer
With boundless faith in our destiny
We solemnly declare:

Side by side we stand
Islands of the blue Caribbean sea,
This our native land
We pledge our lives to thee.

𝄆 Here every creed and race find an equal place,
And may God bless our nation. 𝄇
