= Michael-Fredrick Paul Sauka =

Malawian composer of the national anthem (1934–1990)

Michael-Fredrick Paul Sauka (1934 -1990) was a Malawian teacher, civil servant, church organist and composer. Prior to Malawi's independence from the UK in 1964, he entered and won a national competition, composing the music and the lyrics for "Mlungu dalitsani Malawi" (Oh God Bless Our Land of Malawi) the national anthem of Malawi, which the country adopted, following Sauka's winning submission at the age of 29.

He briefly studied and worked in London during the Swinging Sixties, without ever earning Royalties for his anthem composition and he died in poverty on the 15 August 1990. In 2005, his family attempted to launch a legal challenge to recover the outstanding payments.
