= God Save Our Solomon Islands =

National anthem of Solomon Islands

- National anthem of Solomon Islands
- Lyrics: Panapasa Balekana / Matila Balekana
- Music: Panapasa Balekana
- Adopted: 1978

"God Save Our Solomon Islands" is the national anthem of Solomon Islands. It was adopted in 1978 following independence. The lyrics were authored by Fijian-born husband and wife Panapasa and Matila Balekana, and the music was composed by Panapasa.

== History ==
The anthem was composed by Fijian-born Panapasa Balekana (1929–2009) and authored together with his wife, Matila. In the run-up to independence on 7 July 1978, the government of Solomon Islands decided that it needed a national anthem for the occasion. The government announced on the radio that it would accept submissions from the general public for a new anthem.

Balekana, who had moved to Solomon Islands in 1953 to work as a government mechanic, and his wife, Matila, decided to jointly enter the competition as a team. The couple agreed that the new anthem should be in the form of a prayer, asking God to support and guide the new island nation.

Balekana claimed in interviews to have received his inspiration for the anthem in a dream. After he woke up from the dream, Balekana and his wife immediately began writing words and lyrics, as well as composing the tune. Panapasa and Matila Balekana co-wrote the lyrics for the anthem, while Panapasa composed the accompanying music. The couple credited prayer and God for their success in creating the anthem, noting how well the song came together.

Once the lyrics and music had been composed, Panapasa and Matila received help recording the prospective anthem from the Wesley United Church choir at the couple's own congregation. The choir sang the song for the first time, which was recorded on tape and submitted to competition officials.

The Balekanas' submission, "God Save Our Solomon Islands", won the competition, for which Panapasa was awarded SI$250 for the lyrics and music each, and became the national anthem of the Solomon Islands. It was sung on the country's first independence day, 7 July 1978. Balekana was overjoyed and explained the importance of the anthem and its meaning:

Solomon Islands national anthem was written in a form of prayer asking God for safekeeping and protection of our new nation. By the power and grace of God, we may receive joy, peace, progress and prosperity, if only we can be able to work together in harmony. These may be the foundation of building our nation, as we can be rest assured that we will reach our destination—stands forever more.

== Lyrics ==
God save our Solomon Islands from shore to shore
Bless (Note: Sometimes written as "blessed".) all our people and all our lands
With your protecting hands
Joy, peace, progress and prosperity
That men should brothers be, make nations see
Our Solomon Islands, our Solomon Islands
Our nation Solomon Islands
Stands for ever more.

== See also ==
- "Walkabout long Chinatown", a folksong which the government describes as the national song of Solomon Islands.
