= Esta É a Nossa Pátria Amada =

National anthem of Guinea-Bissau

English: This Is Our Beloved Homeland
- National anthem of Guinea-Bissau; Former national anthem of Cape Verde
- Lyrics: Amílcar Cabral, 1963
- Music: Xiao He, 1963
- Adopted: 1974
- Relinquished: 1996 (Cape Verde)

"Esta É a Nossa Pátria Amada" (English: "This Is Our Beloved Homeland") is the national anthem of Guinea-Bissau. Written in 1963 by Amílcar Cabral (1924–1973) and composed by Xiao He (1918–2010), it was adopted upon independence from Portugal in 1974.

It was also the national anthem of Cape Verde, a legacy of both countries' joint independence, until 1996, when a new anthem ("Cântico da Liberdade") was adopted by Cape Verde.

== History ==
The anthem was written by independence leader of Guinea-Bissau and Cape Verde Amílcar Cabral. Cabral, a Bissau-Guinean son of Bissau-Guineans and Cape Verdeans, was the leader of the African Party for the Independence of Guinea and Cape Verde (PAIGC).

In 1963, a delegation from then Portuguese Guinea visited China and heard music by composer Xiao He. Cabral asked Xiao to compose a piece that would inspire his people in their struggle for independence. Set to a 1963 poem by Cabral, the piece was later adopted by Guinea Bissau and Cape Verde as the national anthem upon their independence from Portugal in 1974.

In the 1990s, after the African Party for the Independence of Cape Verde allowed multi-party rule, it was decided that Cape Verde should adopt its own national symbols, including a flag and anthem. A new anthem, "Cântico da Liberdade", was adopted in 1996.

== Lyrics ==
Portuguese original

I
Sol, suor e o verde e mar,
Séculos de dor e esperança;
Esta é a terra dos nossos avós!
Fruto das nossas mãos,
Da flôr do nosso sangue:
Esta é a nossa pátria amada.

Coro:
Viva a pátria gloriosa!
Floriu nos céus a bandeira da luta.
Avante, contra o jugo estrangeiro!
𝄆 Nós vamos construir
Na pátria imortal
A paz e o progresso! 𝄇

II
Ramos do mesmo tronco,
Olhos na mesma luz:
Esta é a força da nossa união!
Cantem o mar e a terra
A madrugada e o sol
Que a nossa luta fecundou.

Coro

IPA transcription (Note: See Help:IPA/Portuguese and Guinean Portuguese.)

1
[sɔl su.ˈɔɾ i‿u veɾ.dɨ‿i maɾ]
[ˈsɛ.ku.luʒ‿dɨ doɾ i‿eʃ.pɨ.ˈɾɐ̃.sɐ]
[ˈɛʃ.tɐ(‿)ɛ ɐ ˈtɛ.ʁɐ duʒ‿ˈnɔ.suz‿ɐ.ˈvɔʃ]
[ˈfɾu.tu dɐʒ‿ˈnɔ.sɐʒ‿mɐ̃w̃ʃ]
[dɐ floɾ du ˈnɔ.su ˈsɐ̃.ɡɨ]
[ˈɛʃ.tɐ(‿)ɛ ɐ ˈnɔ.sɐ ˈpa.tɾjɐ‿ɐ.ˈma.dɐ]

[ko.ɾu]
[ˈvi.vɐ‿ɐ ˈpa.tɾjɐ ɡlu.(ˈ)ɾi(.ˈ)o.zɐ]
[flu.ˈɾiw nuʃ sɛwz‿ɐ bɐ̃.ˈdej.ɾɐ dɐ ˈlu.tɐ]
[ˌa.ˈvɐ̃.tɨ ˈkõ.tɾɐ‿u ˈʒu.gu eʃ.tɾɐ̃.ˈʒej.ɾu]
𝄆 [nɔʒ‿ˈvɐ.muʃ kõʃ.tɾu.ˈiɾ]
[nɐ ˈpa.tɾi(.)ɐ(‿)i.muɾ.ˈtal]
[ɐ paz‿i u pɾu.ˈgɾɛ.su] 𝄇

2
[ˈʁɐ.muʒ‿du ˈmejʒ.mu ˈtɾõ.ku]
[ˈɔ.ʎuʒ‿nɐ ˈmejʒ.mɐ luʃ]
[ˈɛʃ.tɐ(‿)ɛ ɐ ˈfoɾ.sɐ dɐ ˈnɔ.sɐ u.ˈnjɐ̃w̃]
[ˈkɐ̃.tẽj̃ u maɾ i‿ɐ ˈtɛ.ʁɐ]
[ɐ mɐ.dɾu.ˈga.dɐ‿i u sɔl]
[kɨ ɐ ˈnɔ.sɐ ˈlu.tɐ fɨ.kũ.ˈdo(w)]

[ko.ɾu]

English translation

I
Sun, sweat, verdure and sea,
Centuries of pain and hope;
This is the land of our ancestors!
Fruit of our hands,
Of the flower of our blood:
This is our beloved homeland.

Chorus:
Long live our glorious homeland!
The banner of the struggle has fluttered in the skies.
Forward, against the foreign yoke!
𝄆 We are going to build
In our immortal homeland
Peace and progress! 𝄇

II
Branches of the same trunk,
Eyes in the same light;
This is the force of our union!
Sing of the sea and land,
The dawn and the sun
That our struggle fertilised!

Chorus
