= List of wars involving Malawi =

This is a list of wars involving Malawi. Along with these wars, Malawi participated in World War II on the Allied side (it was considered a British colony at the time, and the British were on the Allied side).

| Conflict | Malawi and allies | Opponents | Results | President of Malawi | Losses |
|---|---|---|---|---|---|
| Chilembwe uprising (1915) | Chilembwe Rebels | (United Kingdom) British Empire: Nyasaland | Defeat | | |
| Nyasaland Emergency (1959-1960) | NAC | (United Kingdom) British Empire: Nyasaland | Defeat: Leading Nyasaland African Congress members arrested; Nyasaland African Congress suppressed | | 51 killed, 79 injured, 3,300 arrested |
| 1965 Malawian coup d'etat attempt | Malawi | Henry Chipembere | Victory: Chimpembere's forces killed or captured; 50 Chimpembere supporters captured at a training camp | Hastings Banda | |
| Mozambican Civil War (1987–1992) | (Mozambique) FRELIMO; Zimbabwe; Tanzania; Malawi | RENAMO (Malawi) MYP | Stalemate: Malawi backs both sides from 1987 to 1992 | Hastings Banda | 100+ killed |
| Operation Bwezani (1993) | Malawi | (Malawi) MYP | Victory to the Defence Force: MYP violently dismantled | Hastings Banda | Unknown |
| M23 Rebellion (2012-2013) | Democratic Republic of the Congo (United Nations) MONUSCO: (United Nations) Force Intervention Brigade; South Africa; Tanzania; Malawi | March 23 Movement; Alleged support: Uganda; Rwanda | Victory: M23 disarms and demobilises | Joyce Banda | None |
| ADF Insurgency (2014–) | DR Congo; Uganda; South Africa; Tanzania; Malawi | ADF | Ongoing: UNF Intervention Brigade intervention from 2014 | Peter Mutharika | 1 dead |
