= La Renaissance =

National anthem of the Central African Republic

La Renaissance (French) E Zingo (Sango)
English: The Renaissance
- National anthem of the Central African Republic
- Lyrics: Barthélémy Boganda, ext. 1960
- Music: Herbert Pepper, ext. 1960
- Adopted: 25 May 1960

Audio sample
- La Renaissance, played by the US Navy Band.: file; help

1960s instrumental recording of La Renaissance
The first recording of "La Renaissance" (Sango: "E Zingo")

"La Renaissance" (Sango: "E Zingo") is the national anthem of the Central African Republic. It was adopted on 25 May 1960, shortly before the republic's independence on 13 August the same year. The words were written by then Prime Minister Barthélémy Boganda. The music was composed by French composer Herbert Pepper, who also composed the national anthem of Senegal, "Le Lion rouge". The song was also the national anthem during the Central African Empire (1976–1979).

== Lyrics ==
The anthem has official lyrics in both French and the national language of Sango.

French lyrics

Ô Centrafrique, ô berceau des Bantous !
Reprends ton droit au respect, à la vie !
Longtemps soumis, longtemps brimé par tous,
Mais de ce jour brisant la tyrannie.
Dans le travail, l'ordre et la dignité,
Tu reconquiers ton droit, ton unité,
Et pour franchir cette étape nouvelle,
De nos ancêtres la voix nous appelle.

Refrain:
Au travail dans l'ordre et la dignité,
Dans le respect du droit dans l'unité,
Brisant la misère et la tyrannie,
Brandissant l'étendard de la Patrie.

Sango lyrics

Bêafrîka, mbeso tî âBantu
Kîri mo gbû gîgî tî mo-mvenî
Mo bâa pâsi na gbe tî âzo kûê
Me fadësô, mo ke na kürü gô
Mo sö benda, mo bûngbi kûê ôko
Na kusâra ngâ na nëngö-terê
Tî tö ndâ tî finî dutï tî ë sô
E mä gbegô tî_âkötarä tî ë

Refrain:
E gbû kua nzönî na nëngö-terê
E kpë ndiä nzönî na mängö-terê
E kinda wasïöbê, ë tomba pâsi
E yâa bandêra tî ködrö tî ë!

Sango IPA transcription (Note: See Help:IPA, Sango language § Phonology and Sango language § Orthography.)

[bʷé.à.frí.kà ᵐbʷɛ̀.sò tʲí á.bʷã̀.tù]
[kʲí.rì mò ɡ͡bʷú gʲí.gʲí tʲí mò‿ᶬvɛ̀.nʲí]
[mò bʷá.à pʷá.sì nà ɡ͡bʷè tʲí á.zò kúé]
[mè fà.dē.só mò kʲɛ̀ nà kū.rū gɔ́]
[mò sō bʷɛ̀̃.da mò bʷù̃.ɡ͡bì kúé̯ ɔ́.kɔ̀]
[nà kù.sá.rà‿ᵑɡá nà nɛ̄̃.gō tɛ̀.rɛ̄]
[tʲí tō‿ⁿdá tʲí fʲì.nʲí dù.tʲī tʲí ē só]
[è mā ɡ͡bʷɛ̀.gɔ́ tʲí‿á.kō.tà.rā tʲí ē]

[è ɡ͡bʷú kùà̯‿ⁿzō.nʲí nà nɛ̄̃.gɔ̄ tɛ̀.rɛ̄]
[è k͡pʷē‿ⁿdʲì.ā‿ⁿzō.nʲí nà mā̃.gɔ̄ tɛ̀.rɛ̄]
[è kʲí̃.dà wà.sʲī.ō.bʷé ē tõ.bʷà pá.sì]
[è jáà̯ bʷã.dɛ́.rà tʲí kɔ̄d.rɔ̄ tʲí ē]

English translation

Oh! Central Africa, cradle of the Bantu!
Take up again your right to respect, to life!
Long subjugated, long scorned by all,
But, from today, breaking tyranny's hold.
Through work, order and dignity
You reconquer your rights, your unity,
And to take this new step
The voice of our ancestors call us.

Chorus:
To work! In order and dignity,
In the respect for rights and in unity,
Breaking poverty and tyranny,
Holding high the standard of the Fatherland.
