= Patrick Castagne =

Guyanese-born Trinidadian composer (1916–2000)

- Born: Patrick Stanislaus Castagne; 3 October 1916; British Guiana
- Died: 5 May 2000 (aged 83); Port-of-Spain, Trinidad and Tobago
- Era: 20th century
- Works: "Forged from the Love of Liberty" (1962)

Patrick Stanislaus Castagne MBE, (3 October 1916 – 5 May 2000) was a Guyanese-born Trinidadian composer, best known for composing "Forged from the Love of Liberty", the national anthem of Trinidad and Tobago.

== Early life and education ==
Born to Trinidadian parents in British Guiana, Castagne moved to Trinidad when he was young and grew up there, attending St Mary's College.

Castagne played the piano and had his own band, but gained wide recognition in the 1950s for his hosting of the pre-Carnival "Dimanche Gras" shows. In 1962, he composed the national anthem of Trinidad & Tobago. He also served as a diplomat assigned to the Trinidad & Tobago high commission in London, United Kingdom. While in England, he worked with the BBC in airing West Indian talent on a weekly radio show.

== Career ==
He composed the national anthem for the West Indies Federation (championed by the UK as a means for their colonies in the West Indies to attain a status similar to that achieved by Canada and Australia), which only lasted from 1958 to 1962. Trinidad and Tobago later adopted it as their own national anthem, "Forged from the Love of Liberty", after attaining their own independence on 31 August 1962. His song "Goodnight" was for many years the theme song used as the sign on and sign-off signal by Radio Trinidad. Castagne composed several other songs and calypsoes during his career including 1960 "The Iceman" (1960, sung by calypsonian Lord Melody); "Kiss Me for Christmas" (sung by Kelwyn Hutcheon); "Nimble Like Kimble"; "Hyarima: A Caribbean Rhapsody"; "An Orchid for You"; "Happy Birthday Mom"; "My Easter Bunny".

In 1994 he was awarded Trinidad & Tobago's Chaconia Medal (Gold) (for Public Service and Music). In 1962 Castagne was appointed as a Member of the Most Excellent Order of the British Empire (MBE).

== Later life and death ==
Castagne died in 2000, in Port-of-Spain, Trinidad, from heart failure.

== Personal life ==
Castagne was married to Lucille and had six children, Dianne, Alan, Glenn, Christopher, Michael and Gregory.
