= Herbert Pepper =

French composer (1912–1990)

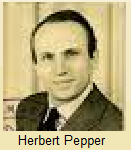
- Born: 14 November 1912; Brest, French Third Republic
- Died: 22 February 2000 (aged 87); Châteauneuf-Grasse, France
- Works: La Renaissance; Le Lion rouge

Herbert Pepper (14 November 1912 – 22 February 2000) was a French songwriter.

Born in Brest, he was the main composer of the national anthem of Senegal, "Le Lion rouge", and that of the Central African Republic, "La Renaissance". He also served in World War II. He died in Châteauneuf-Grasse.
