= O Arise, All You Sons =

National anthem of Papua New Guinea

O Arise, All You Sons Of This Land
- National anthem of Papua New Guinea
- Lyrics: Thomas Shacklady
- Music: Thomas Shacklady
- Adopted: 1975

Audio sample
- U.S. Navy Band instrumental version (one verse): file; help

"O Arise, All You Sons" is the national anthem of Papua New Guinea. Adopted in 1975, it was written and composed by Thomas Shacklady.

== History ==
The National Identity Act of Papua New Guinea was formulated in 1971, motivating the country to create a national flag, a national emblem, a national pledge and a national anthem. A national flag and emblem were adopted in 1971. However, the national anthem remained undecided until independence from Australia in 1975, four years later. Although many songs were submitted to be the anthem, the National Executive Council decided a week before the country's Independence Day (10 September 1975), to adopt as the national anthem a composition that was composed by Chief Inspector Thomas Shacklady (1917–2006), a bandmaster of the Royal Papua New Guinea Constabulary Band.

During the 2015 Pacific Games opening ceremony, the anthem was sung with the first line altered from "O arise, all you sons of this land" to "O arise, sons and daughters of this land". An official later stated that this was illegal and a violation of the National Identity Act.

== Lyrics ==
I
O arise, all you sons of this land, (Note: "You" is sometimes written as "ye".)
Let us sing of our joy to be free, (Note: "Joy" is sometimes sung as "joys".)
Praising God and rejoicing to be
Papua New Guinea.

Shout our name from the mountains to seas (Note: "Name" is sometimes sung as "names", and "seas" is sometimes sung as "sea".)
Papua New Guinea;
Let us raise our voices and proclaim
Papua New Guinea.

II
Now give thanks to the good Lord above
For His kindness, His wisdom and love
For this land of our fathers so free,
Papua New Guinea.

Shout again for the whole world to hear
Papua New Guinea;
We're independent and we're free (Note: Sometimes sung as "We are independent, we are free".)
Papua New Guinea.
