= Panapasa Balekana =

Fijian-born Solomon Islands composer of its national anthem (1929–2009)

Panapasa Balekana MBE SIM
- Born: 1929; Kandavu, Fiji
- Died: 22 January 2009 (aged 79); Henderson, Solomon Islands
- Occupation(s): Pastor, businessman and composer
- Spouse: Matila Balekana

Panapasa Balekana, MBE, SIM, (1929 – 22 January 2009) was a Fijian-born Solomon Islander who composed the national anthem of the Solomon Islands, "God Save Our Solomon Islands", with his wife, Matila Balekana. Panapasa Balekana co-wrote the anthem's lyrics with his wife while he composed the accompanying music.

The anthem was adopted by the country upon its independence in 1978 following a government competition.

== Biography ==
Balekana was originally from Kandavu, Fiji. He moved to the Solomon Islands in 1953 to work as a mechanic for the government, which was under British colonial administration at the time. He was unmarried when he first moved to the Solomon Islands. He eventually married a Fijian woman, Matila Balekana and resided in the Solomon Islands for most of his adult life. The couple had two children, a son and a daughter.

Balekana "fell in love" with the Solomon Islands and decided to stay in the country rather than return to Fiji. On many occasions, Balekana publicly called the Solomon Islands "my home".

Balekana and his family joined the Wesley United Church in Honiara. He remained heavily involved with the congregation, serving as a church pastor and choirmaster.

== National anthem ==
In the run-up to independence on 7 July 1978, the government of the Solomon Islands decided that it needed a national anthem for the occasion. The government announced on the radio that it would accept submissions from the general public for a new anthem.

Panapasa Balekana and his wife, Matila Balekana, decided to jointly enter the competition as a team. The couple agreed that the new anthem should be in the form of a prayer, asking God to support and guide the new island nation.

Balekana claimed in interviews to have received his inspiration for the anthem in a dream. After he woke up from the dream, Balekana and his wife immediately began writing words and lyrics, as well as composing the tune. Panapasa and Matila Balekana co-wrote the lyrics for the anthem, while Panapasa Balekana composed the accompanying music. The couple credited prayer and God for their success in creating the anthem, noting how well the song came together.

Once the lyrics and music had been composed, Panapasa and Matila Balekana received help recording the prospective anthem from the Wesley United Church choir at the couple's own congregation. The choir sang the song for the first time, which was recorded on tape and submitted to competition officials.

The Balekanas' submission, God Save Our Solomon Islands, won the competition, and became the national anthem of the Solomon Islands. It was sung on the country's first independence day, 7 July 1978. Balekana was overjoyed and explained the importance of the anthem and its meaning, "Solomon Islands national anthem was written in a form of prayer asking God for safekeeping and protection of our new nation. By the power and grace of God, we may receive joy, peace, progress and prosperity, if only we can be able to work together in harmony. These may be the foundation of building our nation, as we can be rest assured that we will reach our destination- stands forever more."

== Later life ==
Panapasa Balekana retired from his work as a government mechanic in 1988. Following his retirement he became the manager and director of a Solomon Islander soft drink company, Szetu Enterprise.

In 2000, Panapasa was asked by police to leave the country with his family for his own safety due to the ethnic unrest sweeping the Solomon Islands at the time. Panapasa refused to seek refuge from the violence abroad explaining his loyalty to his adopted country, "I refused and told them that this is my home and should anything happen, this is where I'm supposed to die, this is the place – my home."

Panapasa continued to work as the Wesley United Church choir director until he became too weak in his later years. His son took over the position.

== Death ==
Panapasa Balekana died on 22 January 2009, at his home in Henderson, Solomon Islands, which is located east of the capital city of Honiara. He was 79 years old. He was survived by his wife, daughter, son and five grandchildren.

Balekana was given a state funeral by the Solomon Islands. Balekana's body was laid in state in the main chamber of the National Parliament of the Solomon Islands in the morning of 26 January 2009. VIPs were allowed to lay wreaths in honour of Balekana at the Parliament.

Diginitaries attending the viewing and funeral included the Governor-General of the Solomon Islands Nathaniel Waena. Governor-General Waena and Lady Waena led the viewing procession. Other leading officials at the viewing, by order of precedence, included Prime Minister Dr. Derek Sikua and his wife, Doris Sikua; Speaker to Parliament Sir Peter Kenilorea his wife, Lady Kenilorea; the Chief Justice Sir Albert Palmer; and the Deputy Prime Minister of the Solomon Islands, Fred Fono and his wife. Several former Governors-General, cabinet members, opposition leaders, members of parliament, the diplomatic corps, and the Mayor of Honiara Andrew Mua also attended the state viewing and funeral.

A procession, which included members of the general public, went from Parliament to the Wesley United Church in Honiara for the funeral in the afternoon. The national anthem, God Save Our Solomon Islands, was performed during the funeral service in Balekana's honour.

A police escort brought Balekana's body from the church to the cemetery at Number 3, near the Honiara High School, for burial. Wreaths were laid by the public before the casket was lowered into the gravesite.

== See also ==
- "God Save Our Solomon Islands" – National anthem of the Solomon Islands
