= Ave Crux Alba =

National Anthem of the Sovereign Military Order of Malta

English: Hail Thou White Cross
- The anthem of the Sovereign Military Order of Malta
- Music: Alfredo Consorti, 1930

"Ave Crux Alba" (English: "Hail Thou White Cross") is the national anthem of the Sovereign Military Order of Malta. The anthem was composed in 1930 by Alfredo Consorti.

== Lyrics ==
Latin original

Ave Crux alba, summae pietatis signum,
Ave Crux alba, salutis nostrae sola spes,
Corda fidelium inflamma, adauge gratiam, adauge gratiam.
Ut omnia vincat tuorum ardens caritas,
Ut omnia vincat tuorum ardens caritas.

IPA transcription (Ecclesiastical pronunciation) (Note: See Help:IPA/Latin and Latin phonology and orthography.)

[ˈäː.ve kruks ˈäl.bä ˈsum.me pi(.)e.ˈt̪äː.t̪is ˈsiɲ.ɲum]
[ˈäː.ve kruks ˈäl.bä sä.ˈluː.t̪is ˈnɔs.t̪re ˈsɔː.lä spɛs]
[ˈkɔr.d̪ä fi.ˈd̪ɛː.li(.)um iɱ.ˈfläm.mä ä.ˈd̪äːu̯.d͡ʒe ˈɡrät̪.t̪͡s̪i.äm ä.ˈd̪äːu̯.d͡ʒe ˈɡrät̪.t̪͡s̪i.äm]
[ut̪ ˈɔm.ni.ä ˈviŋ.kät̪ t̪u.ˈɔː.rum ˈär.d̪ens ˈkäː.ri.t̪äs]
[ut̪ ˈɔm.ni(.)ä ˈviŋ.kät̪ t̪u.ˈɔː.rum ˈär.d̪ens ˈkäː.ri.t̪äs]

IPA transcription (Classical pronunciation)

[ˈhäu̯.ɛ krʊks̠ ˈäɫ̪.bä ˈs̠ʊm.mäe̯ pi(.)ɛ.ˈt̪äː.t̪ɪs̠ ˈs̠ɪŋ.nʊ̃ˑ]
[ˈhäu̯.ɛ krʊks̠ ˈäɫ̪.bä s̠ä.ˈɫ̪uː.t̪ɪs̠ ˈnɔs̠.t̪räe̯ ˈs̠oː.ɫ̪ä s̠peːs̠]
[ˈkɔr.d̪ä fɪ.ˈd̪eː.lʲi(.)ʊ̃ˑ ĩː.ˈfɫ̪äm.mäː ä.ˈd̪äu̯.ɡeː ˈɡräː.t̪i.ä̃ˑ ä.ˈd̪äu̯.ɡeː ˈɡräː.t̪i.ä̃ˑ]
[ʊt̪ ˈɔm.ni.ä ˈu̯ɪŋ.kät̪ t̪u.ˈoː.rʊ̃ˑ ˈäːr.d̪ẽːs̠ ˈkäː.rɪ.t̪äːs̠]
[ʊt̪ ˈɔm.ni(.)ä ˈu̯ɪŋ.kät̪ t̪u.ˈoː.rʊ̃ˑ ˈäːr.d̪ẽːs̠ ˈkäː.rɪ.t̪äːs̠]

Italian translation

Ti saluto, Croce Bianca, il più alto segno di pietà,
Salve, Croce Bianca, nostra unica fonte di salute e speranza,
Infiammate i cuori dei fedeli con abbondanti grazie, abbondanti grazie.
Con la tua ardente carità, tutto sarà vinto,
Con la tua ardente carità, tutte le cose saranno vinte.

English translation

Hail, thou White Cross, the highest sign of piety,
Hail, thou White Cross, our only source of health and hope,
Inflame the hearts of the faithful with abundant graces, abundant graces.
With your ardent charity, all things shall be overcome,
With your ardent charity, all things shall be overcome.
