= Samo ku waar =

National anthem of Somaliland

English: Live in Eternal Peace
- National anthem of Somaliland
- Lyrics: Hassan Sheikh Mumin, 1997
- Music: Hassan Sheikh Mumin, 1997
- Adopted: 1997

Audio sample
- Samo ku waar (Instrumental version, 2023): file; help

"Samo ku waar" (Somali pronunciation: [sæmɞ ku wɑːr]; English: Live in Eternal Peace) is the national anthem of the partly recognized republic of Somaliland.

== History ==
=== Republic of Somaliland ===
The current anthem was written and composed by Hassan Sheikh Mumin, a famous Somali playwright and composer. The anthem was adopted in 1997 and is sung in Somali.

== Lyrics ==
Somali original

𝄆 Samo ku waar, samo ku waar 𝄇
Sarreeye calanka sudhan bilay dhulkiisa
Samo ku waariyoo, iyo bogaadin sugan
𝄆 Hanbalyo suuban kugu salaannee, samo ku waar 𝄇

𝄆 Geesiyaashii naftooda u sadqeeyay, qarannimada Soomaaliland 𝄇
𝄆 Xuskooda dhowrsan kugu salaannee, samo ku waar 𝄇

𝄆 Guulside xanbaarsan, Soo noqoshadiisa 𝄇
Kalsooniduu mutaystayee dastuurka
Dastuurka kugu salaan, kugu salaannee (Note: Sometimes sung as Kugu salaannee, kugu salaannee [ku.gu sæ.læːn.nɛː ku.gu sæ.læːn.nɛː].)
𝄆 Midnimo walaalnimo Goobanimo 𝄇

𝄆 Islaanimo kugu salaanee samow samidiyo (Note: Sometimes sung as samadiyo [sæ.mæ.di.jɔ].) 𝄇
𝄆 Samo ku waar samo ku waar Soomaaliland 𝄇 (Note: Sometimes sung as Samo ku waar samo ku waar samo ku waar [sæ.mɔ ku wɑːr sæ.mɔ ku wɑːr sæ.mɔ ku wɑːr].)
𝄆 Samo ku waar samo ku waar Soomaaliland 𝄇

IPA transcription (Note: See Help:IPA, Somali Latin alphabet and Somali phonology.)

𝄆 [sæ.mɔ ku wɑːr sæ.mɔ ku wɑːr] 𝄇
[sær.rɛː.je ʕæ.læn.ka su.ɖæn bi.læj ɖul.kiː.sæ]
[sæ.mɞ ku wɑː.ri.jɔː i.jɔ bɔ.gæː.dɪn su.gæn]
𝄆 [hæn.bæl.jɞ suː.bæn ku.gu sæ.læːn.nɛː sæ.mɞ ku wɑːr] 𝄇

𝄆 [geː.si.jæː.ʃiː næf.tɔː.dæ u sæd.qeː.jæj qæ.ræn.ni.mæ.dæ sɔː.mɑː.li.lænd] 𝄇
𝄆 [ħʉs.kɔː.dæ ɖɔwr.sæn ku.gu sæ.læːn.nɛː sæ.mɞ ku wɑːr] 𝄇

𝄆 [guːl.si.de ħæn.bɑːr.sæn sɔː nɔ.qɔ.ʃæ.diː.s(j)æ] 𝄇
[kæl.sɔː.ni.duː mu.tæj.stæ.jɛː dæs.tuːr.kæ]
[dæs.tuːr.kæ ku.gu sæ.læːn ku.gu sæ.læːn.nɛː]
𝄆 [mid.ni.mɔ wæ.læːl.ni.mɔ gɔː.bæ.ni.mɔ] 𝄇

𝄆 [is.læː.ni.mɔ ku.gu sæ.læː.nɛː sæ.mɔw sæ.mi.di.jɔ] 𝄇
𝄆 [sæ.mɞ ku wɑːr sæ.mɞ ku wɑːr sɔː.mɑː.li.lænd] 𝄇
𝄆 [sæ.mɞ ku wɑːr sæ.mɞ ku wɑːr sɔː.mɑː.li.lænd] 𝄇

English translation

𝄆 Live in eternal peace, live in eternal peace 𝄇
To the high-flying flag that brings beauty to our land
Live in eternal peace, and admiration
𝄆 We greet you with joy, live in eternal peace 𝄇

𝄆 The heroes who sacrificed their lives, For the nationhood of Somaliland 𝄇
𝄆 We greet you with the memory, live in eternal peace 𝄇

𝄆 And the return of the bearer of success 𝄇
For the Symbol of Rebirth
For the trusted Constitution
𝄆 We greet you with unity and brotherhood 𝄇

𝄆 Sovereignty and Muslimhood 𝄇
𝄆 Live in eternal peace, live in eternal peace, oh Somaliland 𝄇
𝄆 Live in eternal peace, live in eternal peace, oh Somaliland 𝄇
