= Hassan Sheikh Mumin =

Somali poet and composer (1931–2008)

Hassan Sheikh Mumin حسن الشيخ مؤمن
- Born: Xasan Sheekh Muumin; 1931; Zeila, British Somaliland
- Died: 16 January 2008 (aged 76–77) Oslo, Norway
- Genres: Somali theatre

Hassan Sheikh Mumin (Somali: Xasan Sheekh Muumiin; Arabic: حسن الشيخ مؤمن; 1931 – 16 January 2008) was a Somali poet, playwright, broadcaster, actor and composer.

== Biography ==
Mumin was born in 1931 in the northwestern town of Zelia, then a part of the British Somaliland protectorate. When he was nine years old, he and his family moved to Borama, where he graduated from school and frequented a local madrasah. He hails from the Jibril Yoonis subclan of the Gadabuursi.

Mumin later joined the Somali Youth League (SYL), Somalia's first political party founded during the pre-independence period. He wrote and published his first poem for an SYL rally in Borama in the early 1950s.

After Somalia obtained its independence in 1960, Mumin worked at Radio Mogadishu between 1965 and 1968 as a resident poet, playwright and lecturer. He later held a position in the national Department of Education and Culture.

After the 1969 military coup d'etat that saw the Supreme Revolutionary Council (SRC) assume power, various cultural works were banned, including Mumin's poetry. He subsequently left Mogadishu for neighboring Djibouti, before later settling again in Borama.

== Major works ==
=== Shabeelnaagood ===
Mumin's most important work is Shabeelnaagood (1965), a piece that touches on the social position of women, urbanization, changing traditional practices, and the importance of education during the early pre-independence period. Although the issues it describes were later to some degree redressed, the work remains a mainstay of Somali literature. Shabeelnaagood was translated into English in 1974 under the title Leopard Among the Women by Bogumił W. Andrzejewski, a pioneer of Somali studies who also wrote the introduction. Mumin composed both the play itself and the music used in it. The piece is regularly featured in various school curricula, including Oxford University, which first published the English translation under its press house.

During one decisive passage in the play, the heroine, Shallaayo, laments that she has been tricked into a false marriage by the Leopard in the title:

"Women have no share in the encampments of this world

And it is men who made these laws, to their own advantage.

By God, by God, men are our enemies, though we ourselves nurtured them

We suckled them at our breasts, and they maimed us:

We do not share peace with them."

Shire Jaamac Axmed published materials from the Somali oral tradition as Gabayo, maahmaah, iyo sheekooyin yaryar ('Poems, Proverbs, and Short Stories') in 1965. He also edited a literary journal, Iftiinka aqoonta ('Light of Education'), and published two short novels in 1973: Halgankiii nolosha ('Life Struggle'), which deals with past struggles; and Rooxaan ('The Spirits').

=== Samo Ku Waar ===
In 1997, Mumin wrote and composed the song Samo ku waar, which became the national anthem of the Republic of Somaliland.

== Legacy ==
Hassan Sheikh Mumin died on 16 January 2008 in Oslo, Norway, at the age of 76–77. He was buried ten days later in his father's mausoleum situated in the Ahmed Guray district of Borama. Hundreds of people reportedly attended his funeral service, including ministers, opposition leaders, poets, singers, and a 12-member delegation from Djibouti. Mumin was also posthumously awarded the highest cultural award by the Djiboutian government.
