= Ali Ismael =

Egyptian musician and composer

- Born: December 28, 1922
- Died: June 16, 1974 (aged 51)
- Citizenship: Egypt
- Occupation: Composer

Ali Ismael (Arabic: علي إسماعيل; 28 December 1922 – 16 June 1974) was an Egyptian musician and composer. He is famous for his Egyptian patriotic songs. Ismael also wrote the music for the national anthem of Palestine, with lyrics by Said Al Muzayin.

His compositions are used in over 350 Egyptian movies; he died in Cairo.

== Regional work ==
Ali is also the composer of the Palestinian national anthem.
