= Royal Jordanian Anthem =

National anthem of Jordan

As-Salām al-Malakī l-ʾUrdunī
English: Peace to the King of Jordan
- السلام الملكي الأردني
- Royal Jordanian Emblem
- National anthem of Jordan
- Also known as: عاش المليك (English: 'Long live the King!')
- Lyrics: ʿAbdul Munʿim Rifāʿī
- Music: ʿAbdul Qādir Tanīr
- Adopted: 25 May 1946

Audio sample
- U.S. Navy Band instrumental version in F major: file; help

The Royal National Anthem is the national anthem of the Hashemite Kingdom of Jordan, (Note: The translated name literally means "Peace to the King of Jordan" (Arabic: السلام الملكي الأردني, romanized: as-Salām al-Malakī l-ʾUrdunī). As-salamu alaykum is the greeting in Arabic; therefore, the name of the anthem can also be regarded as a Royal Salute.) adopted in 1946. The lyrics were penned by ʿAbdul Munʿim Rifāʿī, and the melody was composed by ʿAbdul Qādir Tanīr.

== History ==
The first version of the lyrics was very short, as it only contained the first stanza of the current version. Since then, the anthem has been expanded. The abridged version of the anthem is usually used, while the full version is reserved for special occasions. The composition is in F major on the musical scale.

== Lyrics ==
Arabic original

١
𝄇 عَاشَ الْمَلِيكْ 𝄆
سَامِيًا مَقَامُهُ
خَافِقَاتٍ فِي الْمَعَالِي أَعْلَامُهُ

٢
نَحْنُ أَحْرَزْنَا الْمُنَىٰ
يَوْمَ أَحْيَيْتَ لَنَا
نَهْضَةً تَحْفِزُنَا
تَتَسَامَىٰ فَوْقَ هَامِ الشُّهُبِ

جوقة:
يَا مَلِيكَ الْعَرَبِ
لَكَ مِنْ خَيْرِ نَبِي
شَرَفٌ فِي النَّسَبِ
حَدَّثَتْ عَنْهُ بُطُونُ الْكُتُبِ

٣
اَلشَّبَابُ الْأَمْجَدُ
جُنْدُكَ الْمُجَنَّدُ
عَزْمُهُ لَا يَخْمَدُ
فِيهِ مِنْ مَعْنَاكَ رَمْزُ الدَّأَبِ

جوقة

٤
دُمْتَ نُورًا وَهُدَىٰ
فِي الْبَرَايَا سَيِّدَا
هَانِئًا مُمَجَّدَا
تَحْتَ أَعْلَامِكَ مَجْدُ الْعَرَبِ

جوقة

Romanization of Arabic

I
𝄆 ʿĀš al-Malīk 𝄇
Sāmiyan maqāmuhu
Xāfiqātin fī-l-maʿālī ʾaʿlāmuhu

II
Naḥnu ʾaḥraznā l-munā
Yawma ʾaḥyayta lanā
Nahḍatan taḥfizunā
Tatasāmā fawqa hāmi š-šuhubi

Jawqa:
Yā malīka l-ʿArabi
Laka min xayri nabī
Šarafun fī-n-nasabi
Ḥaddaṯat ʿanhu buṭūnu l-kutubi

III
Aš-šabābu l-ʾamjadu
Junduka l-mujannadu
ʿAzmuhu lā yaxmadu
Fīhi min maʿnāka ramzu d-daʾabi

Jawqa

IV
Dumta nūran wa-hudā
Fī-l-barāyā sayyidā
Hāniʾan mumajjadā
Taḥta ʾaʿlāmika majdu l-ʿArabi

Jawqa

IPA transcription (Note: See Help:IPA/Arabic and Jordanian Arabic § Phonology.)

1
𝄆 [ʕɑːʃ æl.mæ.liːk] 𝄇
[sæː.mi.jæn mɑ.qɑː.mu.hu]
[xɑː.fɪ.qɑː.tɪn fɪː‿l.mæ.ʕæː.liː ʔɑʕ.læː.mu.hu]

2
[nɑħ.nʊ ʔɑħ.rɑz.næː‿l.mʊ.næː]
[jɑw.mæ ʔɑħ.jæj.tæ læ.næː]
[nɑh.dˁɑ.tæn tɑħ.fɪ.zʊ.næː]
[tæ.tæ.sæː.mæː fɑw.qɑ hæː.mi‿ʃ.ʃu.hu.bi]

[ʒɑw.qɑ]
[jæː mæ.liːkæ‿l.ʕɑ.rɑ.bi]
[læ.kæ mɪn xɑj.ri næ.biː]
[ʃɑ.rɑ.fʊn fɪː‿n.næ.sæ.bi]
[ħɑd.dæ.θæt ʕɑn.hu bʊ.tˁʊː.nʊ‿l.ku.tu.bi]

3
[æʃ.ʃæ.bæː.bu‿l.ʔæm.ʒæ.du]
[ʒun.du.kæ‿l.mu.ʒæn.næ.du]
[ʕɑz.mu.hu læː jɑx.mæ.du]
[fiː.hi mɪn mɑʕ.næː.kɑ rɑm.zu‿d.dæ.ʔæ.bi]

[ʒɑw.qɑ]

4
[dʊm.tæ nuː.rɑn wæ hʊ.dæː]
[fɪː‿l.bɑ.rɑː.jæː sæj.jɪ.dæː]
[hæː.ni.ʔæn mu.mæʒ.ʒæ.dæː]
[tɑħ.tæ ʔɑʕ.læː.mi.kæ mæʒ.du‿l.ʕɑ.rɑ.bi]

[ʒɑw.qɑ]

English translation (poetic)

I
𝄆 Long live the King! 𝄇
His position sublime,
His banners wave in glory supreme.

II
Our goal we've attained,
For us the day you've revived,
A revolution gives us our motivation!
Flying over the shoulders of the highest comets.

Chorus:
O king of Arabs,
From your best prophet.
The honour of the dynasty,
Talked about in the depths of books!

III
All the youthful men
Are your armies
His determination never dies out!
Getting from your meaning a symbol of well-being! (Note: Translated literally. Meaning: "Getting from you the manners you have!")

Chorus

IV
May you stay the light and the guide,
A master in being away of all sins and wrong-doing,
Living your life happily and well-respected!
Under your flag rests the glory of Arabs.

Chorus
