= Pastor Rahajason =

Malagasy priest, writer of the national anthem (1897–1971)

"Pastor" Rahajason (1897-1971) was a writer and a Christian priest from Madagascar.

He wrote the lyrics of the national anthem of Madagascar Ry Tanindraza nay malala ô (Oh, Beloved Homeland of Our Ancestors) in 1958. Norbert Raharisoa composed the music of this anthem.
