= Ry Tanindrazanay malala ô! =

National anthem of Madagascar

Ry Tanindrazanay malala ô ! Ô Terre de nos ancêtres bien-aimés ! (French)
English: Oh, beloved land of our ancestors!
- The seal of Madagascar
- National anthem of Madagascar
- Lyrics: Pasteur Rahajason, 1958
- Music: Norbert Raharisoa, 1958
- Adopted: 27 April 1959

Audio sample
- file; help

"Ry Tanindrazanay malala ô !" (Malagasy pronunciation: [ri taniⁿɖ͡ʐazanaj malala o]) is the national anthem of Madagascar. The lyrics were written by Pasteur Rahajason, and the music by Norbert Raharisoa. It is similar to a march and was strongly influenced by European music and the French colonial education system. It is often played by Malagasy musicians on the accordion.

The anthem was officially adopted on 27 April 1959 by the parliament of Madagascar prior to the official granting of independence on 26 June 1960. Philibert Tsiranana was the prime minister of Madagascar during the creation of the anthem, and Michel Debré was the French prime minister during this time. The main focus of the anthem is love of the land, as well as thankfulness to God and an appeal to unity and loyalty under the nation.

== History ==
Pastor Rahajason (1897-1971) is credited with writing the national anthem of Madagascar. He was influenced by the French colonial education system, the aim of which was to assimilate the colonised people and was part of the broader civilising mission. This system was designed to orient local Malagasy populations towards the French colonial project, promoting strong ties to the French language, as well as French civilisation, values and cultural preferences. The schools were often associated with various missionary organisations, imparting a strong religious education overtone, also accounting for Rahajason's exposure to Christianity and his subsequent decision to become a pastor.

Norbert Raharisoa (1914-1963) is credited with composing the national anthem of Madagascar. Raharisoa was also a music teacher and professor. He died shortly after the adoption of his composition. He was honoured for his contributions to Malagasy culture by being featured on the 40 franc postage stamp in 1967. Like his colleague Rahajason, Raharisoa was raised under the French colonial education system, which explains the colonial influence on the anthem.

The national anthem was officially adopted on 27 April 1959, approximately one year before Madagascar achieved independence from France, on 26 June 1960. The anthem was originally written in French and Malagasy.

== Music ==
The anthem is written as a European-style march, consistent with many national anthems around the world. The march is traditionally a military style, with a strong and even beat, originally meant to help troops "march" in step while travelling.

The anthem betrays its colonial influence through the general absence of local musical styles and instrument types. Ron Emoff, professor of music and anthropology at OSU Newark, notes that the anthem is not played in the vakondra-zana style, which is the style of the ancestors' music, also known as a form of traditional music. Emoff also notes that the anthem is usually not played on the local instrument, the valiha. This is because the anthem replicates the same essential ingredients that European hymns use, which are themselves based on old religious and nationalistic hymns.

== Lyrics ==
Malagasy lyrics

I
Ry Tanindrazanay malala ô!
Ry Madagasikara soa.
Ny Fitiavanay anao tsy miala,
Fa ho anao, ho anao doria tokoa.

Refrain:
Tahionao ry Zanahary
'Ty Nosindrazanay ity
Hiadana sy ho finaritra
He! Sambatra tokoa izahay.

II
Ry Tanindrazanay malala ô!
Irinay mba hanompoana anao
Ny tena sy fo fanahy anananay,
'Zay sarobidy sy mendrika tokoa.

Refrain

III
Ry Tanindrazanay malala ô!
Irinay mba hitahiana anao,
Ka Ilay Nahary 'zao tontolo izao
No fototra ijoroan'ny satanao.

𝄆 Refrain 𝄇

IPA transcription (Note: See Help:IPA/Malagasy and Malagasy language § Phonology.)

1
[ri ta.ni.ⁿɖ͡ʐa.za.naj ma.la.la o]
[ri ma.da.ga.si.kʲa.ra su]
[ni fi.tʲa.va.naj a.naw t͡si mʲa.la]
[fa hu a.naw hu a.naw du.ri(ə̥) tu.ku]

[ta.hi.u.naw ri za.na.ha.ri]
[ti nu.si.ⁿɖ͡ʐa.za.naj i.ti]
[hi.a.da.na si hu fi.na.ri.ʈ͡ʂa]
[(h)e sa.ᵐba.ʈ͡ʂa tu.ku i.za.ha(j)]

2
[ri ta.ni.ⁿɖ͡ʐa.za.naj ma.la.la o]
[i.ri.naj‿ᵐba ha.nu.ᵐpun.a.naw]
[ni te.na si fu fa.na.hi‿a.na.na.naj]
[zaj sa.ru.bi.di si me.ⁿɖ͡ʐi.kʲa tu.ku]

3
[ri ta.ni.ⁿɖ͡ʐa.za.naj ma.la.la o]
[i.ri.naj‿ᵐba hi.ta.hi(ə̥)n.a.naw]
[ka i.laj na.ha.ri zaw tu.ⁿtu.lu‿i.zaw]
[nu fu.tu.ʈ͡ʂa i.d͡zu.run.ni sa.ta.naw]

French translation

I
Ô Chère Terre de nos ancêtres,
Ô belle Madagascar !
Notre amour pour toi ne faillira pas
Et restera à ta cause éternellement fidèle.

Refrain:
Benit, ô Créateur,
Cette île de nos ancêtres
Qu'elle connaisse joie et bonheur
Et que nous soyons vraiment heureux.

II
Ô Terre de nos ancêtres chérie
Nous espérons mettre à ton service
notre corps, notre cœur, notre âme,
qui est certes précieux et plein de dignité.

Refrain

III
Ô Terre de nos ancêtres chérie
Nous implorons que tu sois bénie,
par le créateur de l'Univers
qui est la base de ton existence

𝄆 Refrain 𝄇

Literal English translation of the French

I
Oh dear land of our ancestors,
Oh beautiful Madagascar!
Our love for you will not falter,
And will remain to your cause eternally faithful.

Chorus:
Bless, oh Creator,
This island of our ancestors
May it know joy and happiness
And may we be truly happy.

II
Oh beloved land of our ancestors
We wish to place at your service
Our body, our heart, our soul,
which is indeed precious and full of dignity.

Chorus

III
Oh beloved land of our ancestors
We pray that you be blessed,
By the Creator of the universe
who is the foundation of your existence.

𝄆 Chorus 𝄇

=== Analysis of lyrics ===
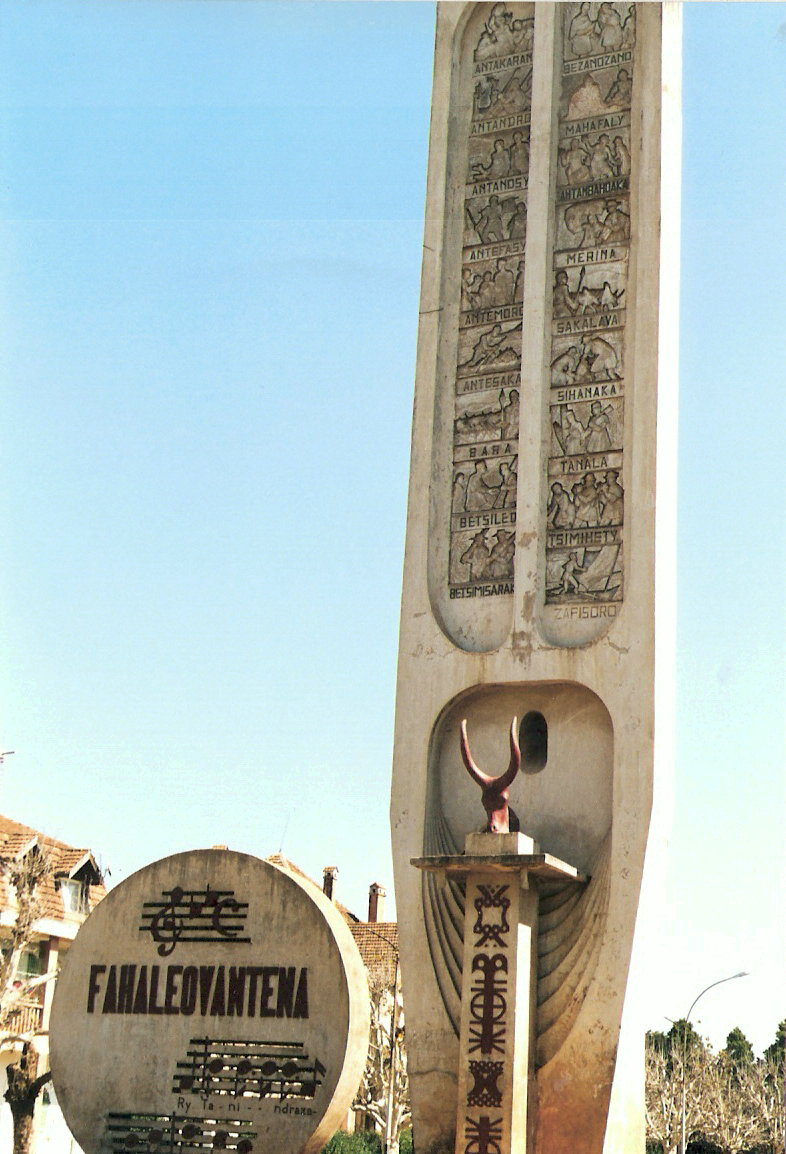
A monument in Antsirabe displaying the first two measures of "Ry Tanindrazanay malala ô!"

Writing about Madagascar, researcher Igor Cusack explains that its anthem was influenced by its French colonial masters and featured the themes: blessed by God, God save our land/people, and a nonspecific love of their beloved land.

According to Cusack, the first stanza focuses on an all-encompassing love of the nation and the land. It opens with a collective remembrance and affection for the past and the ways of the past as represented by the ancestors and closes with a nationalistic promise of fidelity and loyalty to the nation.

Cusack states that the chorus is a prayer to the Creator, who is most likely the Christian God, based on Madagascar's French colonial legacy. It connects the present once again to the past of the ancestors and asks a general blessing of joy and happiness on the country and its people.

The third stanza, Cusack states, is a response to the beauty of Madagascar and the love of its citizens have for it. They affirm their connection to the nation and their desire to serve the nation with body, heart and soul.

The final stanza is said to reaffirm the love the Malagasy have for their beloved nation and ask blessings on it and its people by again referencing the Christian God.
