= Cântico da Liberdade =

National anthem of Cape Verde

English: Chant of Freedom
- National anthem of Cape Verde
- Lyrics: Amílcar Spencer Lopes
- Music: Adalberto Higino Tavares Silva
- Adopted: 1996
- Preceded by: "Esta É a Nossa Pátria Amada"

Audio sample
- U.S. Navy Band instrumental version: file; help

"Cântico da Liberdade" (English: "Chant of Freedom") is the national anthem of Cape Verde. It was made official in 1996, replacing "Esta É a Nossa Pátria Amada", which was also the national anthem of Guinea Bissau, a legacy of both countries' joint independence. The music was composed by Adalberto Higino Tavares Silva (1961–), and the lyrics were written by Amílcar Spencer Lopes (1948–).

The national anthem must be played at the beginning and end of all public events in which the head of state is present and also when national parties and openings and closings of radio and television broadcasts are held.

== Lyrics ==
Portuguese original

Coro
Canta, irmão
Canta meu irmão
Que a Liberdade é hino
E o Homem a certeza.

I
Com dignidade, enterra a semente
no pó da ilha nua
No despenhadeiro da vida
A esperança é
Do tamanho do mar
Que nos abraça
Sentinela de mares e ventos
Perseverante
Entre estrelas
E o Atlântico
Entoa o cântico da Liberdade

Coro

IPA transcription (Note: See Help:IPA/Portuguese and Cape Verdean Portuguese.)

Chorus
[ˈkɐ̃.tɐ iɾ.ˈmɐ̃w̃]
[ˈkɐ̃.tɐ mew iɾ.ˈmɐ̃w̃]
[k(ɨ)‿ɐ li.bɨɾ.ˈda.d‿ɛ ˈi.nu]
[i‿u ˈɔ.mẽj ɐ sɨɾ.ˈte.zɐ]

I
[kõ diɡ.ni.ˈda.dɨ ẽ.ˈtɛ.ʁ‿ɐ sɨ.ˈmẽ.tɨ]
[nu pɔ dɐ ˈi.ʎɐ ˈnu.ɐ]
[nu dɨ.ʃpe.ɲɐ.ˈdej. ɾu dɐ ˈvi.dɐ]
[ɐ‿ʃ.pɨ.ˈɾɐ̃.sɐ ɛ]
[du tɐ.ˈmɐ.ɲu du maɾ]
[kɨ nuz‿ɐ.ˈbɾa.sɐ]
[sẽ.ti.ˈnɛ.lɐ dɨ ˈma.ɾɨz‿i ˈvẽ.tuʃ]
[pɨɾ.sɨ.vɨ.ˈɾɐ̃.tɨ]
[ˈẽ.tɾ‿ɨʃ.ˈtɾe.lɐʃ]
[i u ɐt.ˈlɐ̃.ti.ku]
[ẽ.ˈto(w).ɐ u ˈkɐ̃.ti.ku dɐ li.bɨɾ.ˈda.dɨ]

Chorus

English translation

Chorus
Sing, brother
Sing, my brother
For Freedom is hymn
And the Man the certainty.

I
With dignity, bury the seed
In the dust of the naked island
At the escarpment of life
Hope is
As big as the sea
Which embraces us
Sentinel of the oceans and winds
Persevering
Between the stars
And the Atlantic
Intone the Chant of Freedom.

Chorus
