= List of wrong anthem incidents =

This is a list of incidents when an incorrect national anthem was accidentally played, sung or performed, including playing the anthem of the wrong country, playing an outdated anthem, and playing a non-anthem piece in place of a national anthem.

== List ==
Event and host	Date	Country affected	Incident	Type	Occasion
Opening ceremony of the Kiel Canal, Rendsburg, Germany	21 June 1895	Ottoman Empire	When the Ottoman ship Fuad sailed past the naval band present as part of the ceremony, the band noticed that they did not have the sheet music for the Ottoman anthem. Instead, they played the German folk song "Guter Mond" (transl. Good Moon), a reference to the crescent of the Ottoman flag.	Non-anthem – foreign folk song	Politics
1920 Summer Olympics, Antwerp, Belgium	18 August 1920	Italy	After Ugo Frigerio won the gold medal in the 10 kilometres walk, the band present was unable to find the score of the anthem of Italy, and instead played "'O sole mio," one of the most popular Italian songs of the time. The music was so well known by the public that the crowd all sang it together.	Non-anthem – popular song	Athletics
1949 San Remo Grand Prix, San Remo, Italy	3 April 1949	Argentina	Juan Manuel Fangio won his first ever international race in Ospedaletti, but the Italian host did not have a recording of the Argentinian National Anthem. Instead, it was replaced with “La Cumparsita”, a popular Uruguayan tango song.	Non-anthem – foreign popular song	Auto racing
State visit of Federal Chancellor Konrad Adenauer to the USA	April 1953	West Germany	During Adenauer's visit to Chicago, a band performed the carnival song "Heidewitzka, Herr Kapitän".	Non-anthem – folk song	Politics
State visit of President Camille Chamoun to São Paulo, Brazil	May 1954	Lebanon	A military band performed the national anthem of Israel upon Chamoun's arrival at the airport, as the band leader had mistakenly distributed the wrong sheet music.	Wrong country	Politics
1957 Ice Hockey World Championships, Moscow, USSR	5 March 1957	Sweden	Sweden unexpectedly won the tournament against the Soviet Union, and the host country did not have a recording of their national anthem ready to play. The players agreed to sing the anthem in place of a recording, but as they did not know the full lyrics, they instead sang the drinking song "Helan Går".	Non-anthem – folk song	Ice hockey
Friendly match between Italy and England, Wembley, United Kingdom	6 May 1959	Italy	"Marcia Reale", the anthem of the Kingdom of Italy, was played before the match.	Outdated	Football
1964 Summer Olympics, Tokyo, Japan	21 October 1964	Ethiopia	The Japanese house band played their own national anthem for men's marathon gold medalist Abebe Bikila due to not knowing the Ethiopian anthem in use at the time.	Wrong country	Athletics
1967 South African Grand Prix, Midrand, South Africa	2 January 1967	Mexico	Not having sheet music for the national anthem of Mexico, a brass band performed "Jarabe Tapatío" (some sources report that "South of the Border" was played) for winning driver Pedro Rodríguez during the podium ceremony. To avoid such mistakes, Rodríguez brought with him a record of the national anthem of Mexico.	Non-anthem – folk song	Auto racing
Friendly match between Czechoslovakia and Spain, Prague, Czechoslovakia	1 October 1967	Spain	A military band played "Himno de Riego", the anthem used during the Second Spanish Republic, rather than the anthem in use at the time. The Czechoslovak Football Association apologised to the Spanish Football Federation with a letter stating that a functionary of the Czechoslovak football body took responsibility for the mistake, specifying that "it was the only score they had at hand".	Outdated	Football
State visit of Chairman of the RCC Muammar Gaddafi to Paris, France	23 November 1973	Libya	During Gaddafi's welcoming ceremony, the band of the Republican Guard played "Libya, Libya, Libya", the country's former national anthem under King Idris, instead of "Allahu Akbar", the anthem in use at the time.	Outdated	Politics
1977 Austrian Grand Prix, Spielberg, Austria	14 August 1977	Australia	It has been falsely claimed that "Happy Birthday to You" was played for winning driver Alan Jones. However, "Advance Australia Fair" was actually played, different from what Jones remembered.	Non-anthem – foreign folk song (misconception)	Auto racing
State visit of President Nicolae Ceaușescu to Washington, D.C., USA	13 April 1978	Romania	During Ceaușescu's reception at the White House, the United States Army Band performed "Fatherland Romania", variously referred to as an anthem "from capitalist days" or the predecessor anthem to "Trei culori", Romania's anthem at the time.	Outdated	Politics
1978 World Chess Championship between Anatoly Karpov and Viktor Korchnoi, Baguio, Philippines	17 July 1978	Soviet Union	At the opening ceremony of the match between Karpov and Korchnoi, the latter had planned to sit down in protest as the State Anthem of the Soviet Union played. However, the organisers mistakenly played The Internationale instead, which had functioned as the Soviet anthem until 1944.	Outdated	Chess
6th Summit of the Non-Aligned Movement, Havana, Cuba	3 September 1979	Iraq	At the opening ceremony, a brass band played the anthem of Egypt for Iraqi President Saddam Hussein.	Wrong country	Politics
Friendly match between West Germany and Yugoslavia, Luxembourg City, Luxembourg	7 June 1983	Yugoslavia	Before the match, the band played the anthem of the former Kingdom of Yugoslavia. The Yugoslav players refused to begin the game for nearly 90 minutes, until the correct anthem was performed.	Outdated	Football
1985 FIS Alpine World Ski Championships, Bormio, Italy	7 February 1985	West Germany	At the awards ceremony, the East German national anthem was played for West German gold medallist Markus Wasmeier.	Wrong country	Giant slalom
1986 FIFA World Cup OFC qualifiers, Melbourne, Australia	20 October 1985	Australia	Before a match between Australia and Israel, the West German national anthem was initially played for the Australian team.	Wrong country	Football
1986 FIFA World Cup, Mexico	1986	Belgium	The West German national anthem was played for Belgium.	Wrong country	Football
1986 FIFA World Cup, Guadalajara, Mexico	1 June 1986	Brazil	Before the opening game of Group D between Brazil and Spain, the Brazilian Flag Anthem was played instead of the Brazilian National Anthem.	Non-anthem – patriotic song	Football
1987 Rugby World Cup, Dunedin	30 May 1987	Canada	Before the match between Canada and Ireland, due to Canada choosing not to play "O Canada" as Ireland did not have an anthem for the away matches (with Amhrán na bhFiann being the one used when Ireland plays in Dublin) and the political situation in the island, the organisers played God Defend New Zealand. However, a group of Irish supporters in the crowd sang an impromptu rendition of Amhrán na BhFiann before the kick-off.	Wrong country	Rugby union
Moscow Bears–Tacoma Express match, Tacoma, Washington, USA	2 July 1990	Soviet Union	The Turkish national anthem was played for the Moscow Bears, who were touring the United States as the Soviet national American football team. The Tacoma Dome crew realized the mistake while "The Star-Spangled Banner" was being performed for the hosting Express, then played the Soviet anthem afterward.	Wrong country	American football
1991 Five Nations Championship, Paris, France	19 January 1991	Scotland	Marche des Soldats de Robert Bruce (the air of "Scots Wha Hae") was played by a Gendarmerie band for the Scottish team before a game against France, as the score for "Flower of Scotland" was not available at the time.	Non-anthem – patriotic song	Rugby union
Friendly match between Brazil and Bulgaria, Uberlândia, Brazil	28 May 1991	Bulgaria	A Brazilian military band played "Shumi Maritsa", the national anthem of the Kingdom of Bulgaria, allegedly misunderstanding that the anthem had changed after fall of communism in the country.	Outdated	Rugby
Canadian Football League match between Las Vegas Posse and Sacramento Gold Miners	16 July 1994	Canada	At a match in Las Vegas between the two American teams, part of the short-lived CFL expansion into the US, singer Dennis Casey Park was approached at one day's notice to sing the anthem, which he assumed would be "The Star-Spangled Banner." He only learned a few hours later that it would be "O Canada," with which he was unfamiliar. He attempted to learn it, but at the match, he was unable to remember the melody as there was no backing music. He sang part of the anthem to the tune of "O Tannenbaum." The CFL was deluged with complaints, including one from the office of Prime Minister Jean Chrétien, and team owner Nick Mileti apologized. Two weeks later, Park was invited to perform "O Canada" at a Hamilton Tiger-Cats game and did so correctly.	Non-anthem – foreign folk song	Canadian football
State visit of Federal President Roman Herzog to Porto Alegre, Brazil	23 November 1995	Germany	During a reception for Herzog, a police band performed the anthem of the former German Democratic Republic.	Outdated	Politics
1998 Belgian Grand Prix, Francorchamps, Belgium	30 August 1998	Republic of Ireland	The anthem of the United Kingdom was also played for the winning Irish-licensed Jordan team, despite being correctly played for their winning driver Damon Hill.	Wrong country/outdated	Auto racing
1999 World Men's Handball Championship, Cairo, Egypt	3 June 1999	Spain	Before a match between Argentina and Spain, the anthem of Morocco was played for the latter.	Wrong country	Handball
2001 World Aquatics Championships, Fukuoka, Japan	29 July 2001	Spain	No anthem was played.	No music played	Waterpolo
State visit of President Milan Kučan to Bucharest, Romania	11 July 2002	Slovenia	The anthem of Slovakia was played upon Kučan's arrival at the airport.	Wrong country	Politics
2003 Davis Cup, Melbourne, Australia	28 November 2003	Spain	Before the final between Australia and Spain the "Himno de Riego", the anthem used during the Second Spanish Republic, was played. The mistake provoked a reaction from Secretary of State for Sport Juan Antonio Gómez-Angulo, who was present and left the stadium in protest, and then instructed the Spanish team not to begin until an apology had been issued.	Outdated	Tennis
2004 African Cup of Nations, Sfax, Tunisia	25 January 2004	Zimbabwe	Before a match between Egypt and Zimbabwe "Ishe Komborera Africa", the Zimbabwean national anthem until 1994, was played.	Outdated	Football
2004 African Cup of Nations, Radès, Tunisia	11 February 2004	Nigeria	Before the semi-final match between Nigeria and Tunisia, the national anthem of Liberia was played.	Wrong country	Football
State visit of President Ricardo Lagos to Asunción, Paraguay	14 May 2004	Chile	During a reception for Lagos, a military band performed a verse of the national anthem of Chile that had been discarded due to its associations with the country's former military dictatorship.	Outdated	Politics
2004 African Championships in Athletics, Brazzaville, Republic of the Congo	18 July 2004	Zimbabwe	During the award ceremony "Ishe Komborera Africa", the Zimbabwean national anthem until 1994, was played. After several minutes' delay, gold medallist Lloyd Zvasiya took a microphone and sang the correct anthem himself.	Outdated	Athletics
2006 FIFA World Cup, Frankfurt, Germany	13 June 2006	Togo	During a match between South Korea and Togo, the national anthem of South Korea was initially played a second time.	Wrong country	Football
Inauguration of the National Cricket Stadium, St. George's, Grenada	4 February 2007	China	During the inauguration ceremony of the stadium, which was funded by the People's Republic of China (PRC), the national anthem of Taiwan, officially called the Republic of China (ROC), was played before the PRC's ambassador Qian Hongshan.	Wrong country/outdated	Cricket
RTBF television interview with Minister-President of Flanders Yves Leterme, Brussels, Belgium	21 July 2007	Belgium	When asked by an interviewer if he could sing a part of the Belgian national anthem, the Minister-President of Flanders and future Prime Minister of Belgium Leterme began singing the French one instead.	Wrong country	Interview
2008 IAAF World Indoor Championships, Valencia, Spain	9 March 2008	China	The national anthem of Chile was played for gold medallist Liu Xiang during the award ceremony.	Wrong country	Track and field
UEFA Euro 2008	17 April 2008 (first release)	Northern Ireland	The national anthem of the Republic of Ireland was used as the national anthem for the Northern Irish team within this video game. Publishers EA Sports apologised for the error.	Wrong country	Football video game
Friendly international football match, Prague, Czech Republic	27 May 2008	Lithuania	By mistake, the national anthem of Latvia was played instead.	Wrong country	Football
2008 Valencia GP2 Series round, Valencia, Spain	23 August 2008	Russia	"Patrioticheskaya Pesnya", the former Russian national anthem used between 1991 and 2000, was played at the podium ceremony for winner Vitaly Petrov.	Outdated	Auto racing
2008 AFL semi-final, Melbourne, Australia	12 September 2008	Australia	Before a Western Bulldogs–Sydney Swans game, AC/DC's "It's a Long Way to the Top (If You Wanna Rock 'n' Roll)" was briefly played instead of the Australian national anthem.	Non-anthem – popular song	Australian rules football
2009 Chinese Grand Prix, Shanghai, China	19 April 2009	Austria	The national anthem of the United Kingdom was played for the winning Austrian-licensed Red Bull team.	Wrong country	Auto racing
2009 Tour de France, Paris, France	26 July 2009	Spain	The national anthem of Denmark was initially played for winning Spaniard Alberto Contador at the podium ceremony.	Wrong country	Cycling
Presentation of the Order of Merit of the Federal Republic of Germany to civil rights activists from the former GDR	16 November 2009	Germany	East German writer and songwriter Stephan Krawczyk was asked to sing the German anthem at the end of a ceremony to award the Bundesverdienstkreuz to former GDR civil rights activists. Inititally he began singing the original first stanza of the German national anthem, which is not part of the official anthem and is usually avoided due to its associations with the Nazi era. Bundespräsident Horst Köhler briefly joined him in singing "Deutschland, Deutschland..." before both were interrupted by other attendees.	Outdated	Awards ceremony
2010 United States motorcycle Grand Prix, Monterey, California, USA	25 July 2010	Spain	The national anthem of Italy was initially played at the podium ceremony for winning Spaniard Jorge Lorenzo, before the anthem of Spain was played correctly.	Wrong country	Motorcycle racing
2010 Junior League World Series, Taylor, Michigan, USA	14 August 2010	Chinese Taipei	During the opening ceremony, when the Chung-Ching Junior Little League team from Taipei, Taiwan (representing Chinese Taipei) was introduced, the national anthem of the China (March of the Volunteers) was played by mistake.	Wrong country	Baseball
State visit of President Doris Leuthard to Oslo, Norway	14 October 2010	Switzerland	During the opening ceremony of Leuthard's visit, a band performed what was variously reported as "a piece composed in the early 1960s" and "a traditional folk-song."	Non-anthem – folk song	Politics
2011 Giro d'Italia, Milan, Italy	29 May 2011	Spain	A version of the Spanish national anthem with lyrics which are no longer included and generally associated with Francoist Spain was played for race winner Alberto Contador.	Outdated	Cycling
2011 ICF Canoe Sprint World Championships, Szeged, Hungary	19 August 2011	Germany	The original first stanza of the German national anthem, which is not part of the official anthem and is usually avoided due to its associations with the Nazi era, was played during the award ceremony for gold medallists Anne Knorr and Debora Niche.	Outdated	Canoe sprint
2011 AFL semi-final, Perth, Australia	17 September 2011	Australia	Before a West Coast Eagles–Carlton game, Carlton's club song, We Are the Navy Blues, was briefly played instead of the Australian national anthem.	Non-anthem – other	Australian rules football
2011 FIFA World Cup qualifying, Devonshire Parish, Bermuda	7 October 2011	Bermuda	Before a game between Bermuda and Trinidad and Tobago, the national anthem of the United States was played.	Wrong country	Football
6th Kostanay Regional Festival of Skiing, Kostanay, Kazakhstan	5 March 2012	Kazakhstan	At the opening ceremony, the first seconds of "Livin' la Vida Loca", a Latin pop song by Ricky Martin, were played.	Non-anthem – foreign popular song	Skiing
Amir of Kuwait International Shooting Grand Prix, Kuwait City, Kuwait	21 March 2012	Kazakhstan	"O Kazakhstan", a parody anthem from the film Borat, was played during gold medallist Mariya Dmitriyenko's award ceremony. The ceremony was later rerun with the correct anthem.	Non-anthem – other	Shooting
Amir of Kuwait International Shooting Grand Prix, Kuwait City, Kuwait	21 March 2012	Serbia	At the same event as the Borat incident, the organizers also reportedly failed to play the correct Serbian national anthem.	Unknown	Shooting
2012 Women's Hockey Investec Cup, Chiswick, United Kingdom	5 June 2012	South Africa	Before a match between South Africa and Great Britain, the former, apartheid-era South African national anthem "Die Stem van Suid-Afrika" was played.	Outdated	Field hockey
Friendly match, Brazil	13 July 2012	Spain	In the last match against the Brazilian team, the anthem of Portugal was played.	Wrong country	Basketball
Friendly match	17 October 2012	Ecuador	Before a match between Ecuador and Venezuela, the national anthem of Mexico was played	Wrong country	Football
2012–13 Men's FIH Hockey World League, Rotterdam, Netherlands	14 June 2013	Australia	Before a match between Australia and Belgium, the national anthem of New Zealand was initially played.	Wrong country	Field hockey
2013 UEFA European Under-19 Championship, Alytus, Lithuania	29 July 2013	Serbia	Before the semifinal between Serbia and Portugal, the national anthem of Yugoslavia was played.	Outdated	Football
2013 FIA WTCC Race of Argentina Termas de Río Hondo, Argentina	4 August 2013	Germany	The original first stanza of the national anthem of Germany, which is not part of the official anthem and is usually avoided due to its associations with the Nazi era, was played for the winning constructor during the award ceremony.	Outdated	Auto racing
2013 Rhythmic Gymnastics World Championships, Kyiv, Ukraine	28 August 2013	Ukraine	The national anthem of Russia was initially played for gold medallist Hanna Rizatdinova during the award ceremony, which was also the same tune as the anthem of the Soviet Union from 1944 to 1991.	Wrong country/outdated	Gymnastics
Friendly match between Malta and Slovakia, Žilina, Slovakia	4 September 2014	Malta	Before the match, the first few notes of Linkin Park's "Numb" were played.	Non-anthem – foreign popular song	Football
2014 World Artistic Gymnastics Championships, Nanning, China	12 October 2014	Ukraine	The national anthem of Uzbekistan was played for gold medallist Oleg Verniaiev during the award ceremony.	Wrong country	Gymnastics
2014 Beach Soccer Intercontinental Cup	4 November 2014	Morocco	An instrumental version of the national anthem of Russia was played instead of the Cherifian Anthem for Morocco before the match between the United Arab Emirates and Morocco.	Wrong country	Beach soccer
2014–15 Kontinental Hockey League, Bratislava, Slovakia	25 November 2014	Russia	Before a match between Lokomotiv Yaroslavl and HC Slovan Bratislava, the State Anthem of the Soviet Union – specifically the Stalinist version – was played.	Outdated	Ice hockey
2015 IIHF U18 Women's World Championship, Buffalo, New York, USA	5 January 2015	Russia	Before a match between Russia and the Czech Republic "Patrioticheskaya Pesnya", the former Russian national anthem used between 1991 and 2000, was played.	Outdated	Ice hockey
2015 King's Cup, Nakhon Ratchasima, Thailand	1 February 2015	Honduras	Before a match between Honduras and Thailand, the national anthem of Uzbekistan was played.	Wrong country	Football
2015 FIL World Luge Championships, Sigulda, Latvia	14 February 2015	Germany	The national anthem of the former German Democratic Republic was played for gold medallists Tobias Arlt and Tobias Wendl at the award ceremony.	Outdated	Luge (double)
Friendly match between Argentina and El Salvador, Landover, Maryland, USA	28 March 2015	El Salvador	Before the match, the anthem of the Isle of Man was played. (The fact that this has happened more than once may be to do with the Isle of Man's Gaelic name of "Ellan Vannin", which is close to "El Salvador" in alphabetical order.)	Wrong country	Football
2015 World Deaf Basketball Championship, Taiwan	12 July 2015	Lithuania	The anthem of the Lithuanian Soviet Socialist Republic was played during the award ceremony, during which the Lithuanian team won gold medals.	Outdated	Basketball
2015 BWF World Championships, Jakarta, Indonesia	16 August 2015	Spain	During the award ceremony a version of the Spanish national anthem with lyrics which are no longer included and are generally associated with Francoist Spain was played for the gold medallist Carolina Marín.	Outdated	Badminton
Skeleton America Cup, Calgary, Canada	13 November 2015	Spain	After Ander Mirambell won the stage in Calgary, the anthem did not sound and he had to play it on his phone.	No music initially played	Skeleton
Copa América Centenario, Glendale, Arizona, USA	5 June 2016	Uruguay	Before a match between Mexico and Uruguay, the national anthem of Chile was played.	Wrong country	Football
Qualifier for the 2016 Summer Olympics, Manila, Philippines	6 July 2016	New Zealand	Before a basketball match between New Zealand and France, the national anthem of Canada was played.	Wrong country	Basketball
2016 Summer Olympics, Manaus, Brazil	4 August 2016	Nigeria	Before a football match between Japan and Nigeria, the national anthem of Niger was played.	Wrong country	Football
Skeleton America Cup, Calgary, Canada	14 November 2016	Spain	After Ander Mirambell won the stage in Calgary, the "Himno de Riego", the anthem used during the Second Spanish Republic, was played.	Outdated	Skeleton
2017 Fed Cup, Maui, Hawaii, USA	12 February 2017	Germany	Before a match between Andrea Petkovic and CoCo Vandeweghe, the original first stanza of the national anthem of Germany was sung; this is not part of the official anthem and is usually avoided due to its associations with the Nazi era. Petković was disturbed by the incident, and called it "the worst experience that has ever happened to me."	Outdated	Tennis
2017 Biathlon World Championships, Hochfilzen, Austria	18 February 2017	Russia	"Patrioticheskaya Pesnya", the former Russian national anthem used between 1991 and 2000, was played during the award ceremony for the gold medalists Alexey Volkov, Maxim Tsvetkov, Anton Babikov, and Anton Shipulin.	Outdated	Biathlon
2017 IIHF World Championship, Cologne, Germany	6 May 2017	Slovakia	After a match where Slovakia beat Italy, the national anthem of Slovenia was played.	Wrong country	Ice hockey
2017 FIFA U-20 World Cup, Suwon, South Korea	24 May 2017	Uruguay	The Chilean national anthem was played incorrectly during the Uruguayan part, drawing criticism. The Uruguayan coaches immediately protested, and eventually the Uruguayan national anthem was played after the Japanese national anthem, making a total of three national anthems played during the match. The World Cup organizing committee later admitted the mistake and apologized.	Wrong country	Football
2017 European Athletics U20 Championships, Grosseto, Italy	23 July 2017	Belarus	The national anthem of Bosnia and Herzegovina was played during Viyaleta Skvartsova's medal ceremony, prompting her to walk away from the proceedings.	Wrong country	Track and field
2017 Jerez Formula 2 round, Jerez de la Frontera, Spain	7 October 2017	Monaco	The national anthem of France was initially played during Charles Leclerc's podium ceremony.	Wrong country	Auto racing
2017 World Weightlifting Championships, Anaheim, USA	4 December 2017	Spain	The wrong anthem was played during the award ceremony.	Wrong country	Powerlifting
2018 Rugby Europe Championship, Cologne, Germany	18 March 2018	Russia	Before a match between Germany and Russia, the State Anthem of the Soviet Union was played. Despite this error, the Russian team continued to sing the Soviet anthem lyrics.	Outdated	Rugby
2018 FIA Formula 3 European Championship, Zandvoort, Netherlands	15 July 2018	Russia	"Patrioticheskaya Pesnya", the former Russian national anthem used between 1991 and 2000, was played during Nikita Troitskiy's podium ceremony.	Outdated	Auto racing
2018 Ibero-American Championships in Athletics, Trujillo, Peru	25 August 2018	Spain	A version of the Spanish national anthem with lyrics which are no longer included and generally associated with Francoist Spain was played for winner of hammer throw event Javier Cienfuegos.	Outdated	Athletics
2018 World Masters Athletics Championships, Málaga, Spain	5 September 2018	Germany	The original first stanza of the national anthem of Germany, which is not part of the official anthem and is usually avoided due to its associations with the Nazi era, was played for the German gold medalists during the award ceremony.	Outdated	Marathon
Oktoberfest celebration in Port St. Lucie, Florida, USA	6 October 2018	Germany	The original first stanza of the national anthem of Germany was played, which is not part of the official anthem and is usually avoided due to its associations with the Nazi era.	Outdated	Oktoberfest
2018–19 UEFA Nations League, Yerevan, Armenia	13 October 2018	Gibraltar	Before a match between Gibraltar and Armenia, the national anthem of Liechtenstein was played.	Wrong country	Football
2018 AFC U-19 Championship, Bekasi, Indonesia	22 October 2018	South Korea	Before a match between South Korea and Jordan, the national anthem of North Korea was played.	Wrong country	Football
2018–19 UEFA Nations League D, Skopje, Macedonia	19 November 2018	Gibraltar	Before a match between Gibraltar and Macedonia, "God Save the Queen" was initially played before "Gibraltar Anthem", Gibraltar's territorial anthem, was played correctly.	Wrong country	Football
2018 Meca Hockey Games, Lørenskog, Norway	13 December 2018	Belarus	Before a match between Belarus and Norway, "Kasiu Yas' kanushynu", a song by Belarusian folk rock band Pesniary, was played.	Non-anthem – popular song	Ice hockey
Murcia, Spain	28 April 2019	Spain	A version of the Spanish national anthem with lyrics which are no longer included and generally associated with Francoist Spain was played.	Outdated	Politics
Cotec Europe Forum, Naples, Italy	7 May 2019	Spain	During a visit by King Felipe VI and former King Juan Carlos I, a choir of schoolchildren welcomed them with a version of the Spanish national anthem with lyrics which are no longer included and generally associated with Francoist Spain.	Outdated	Politics
Al Roudan Tournament, Kuwait	16 May 2019	Italy	The Italian footballer Francesco Totti, a special guest at the Al Roudan futsal tournament, was welcomed with the anthem of the Italian political party Forza Italia, founded by Silvio Berlusconi, which was played instead of the Italian national anthem.	Non-anthem – other	Football
Rugby match between Georgia and Scotland	6 September 2019	Georgia	The Scottish Rugby Union (SRU) mistakenly played a Soviet-era song, rather than the current Georgian national anthem.	Outdated	Rugby
2020 UEFA Euro qualifier, Paris, France	7 September 2019	Albania	Before a match between Albania and France, the national anthem of Andorra was played. The kick-off was delayed as the Albanian side refused to begin until the correct anthem was played. French President Emmanuel Macron apologized for the mistake.	Wrong country	Football
2019 Rugby World Cup warm-up match, Sydney, Australia	7 September 2019	Argentina	At the ceremony before a match between the Argentine national rugby team and Australian team Randwick DRUFC, "I Still Haven't Found What I'm Looking For" by U2 was initially played instead of the Argentine national anthem.	Non-anthem – foreign popular song	Rugby union
LGU in Misamis Oriental Provincial Capitol, Cagayan de Oro, Misamis Oriental, Philippines	17 October 2019	Philippines	The Cebuano version of the national anthem of the Philippines was performed during Misamis Oriental's LGU.	Wrong language	Politics
2020 ATP Cup, Sydney, Australia	2 January 2020	Moldova	Before Moldova's opening tie with Belgium, the national anthem of Romania, which was also used as the Moldovan anthem from 1991 to 1994, was played.	Wrong country/outdated	Tennis
2020 Copa do Brasil, Novo Hamburgo, Brazil	13 February 2020	Brazil	Before the match between Novo Hamburgo and Ponte Preta, the first few seconds of the arrocha funk song 'Tudo OK' by Thiaguinho MT, Mila and JS O Mão de Ouro were played incorrectly before the anthem of Rio Grande do Sul.	Non-anthem – popular song	Football
2020 Baja Ha'il, Saudi Arabia	17 December 2020	Spain	A version of the Spanish national anthem with lyrics which are no longer included and generally associated with Francoist Spain was played for race winner Carlos Sainz Sr.	Outdated	Auto racing
2022 FIFA World Cup Asian qualifiers, Dubai, United Arab Emirates	11 June 2021	Indonesia	Before a match between Indonesia and the United Arab Emirates, the national anthem of Malaysia was initially played.	Wrong country	Football
2021 Deutsche Tourenwagen Masters, Monza, Italy	20 June 2021	South Africa	The national anthem played for Kelvin van der Linde for the second race in Monza was Die Stem van Suid-Afrika which was used during the apartheid era in South Africa.	Outdated	Auto racing
UEFA Euro 2020, United Kingdom	30 June 2021	Germany	The original first stanza of the national anthem of Germany was subtitled by Dutch broadcaster NPO. This stanza is not part of the official anthem and is usually avoided due to its associations with the Nazi era.	Outdated	Football
2020 Summer Paralympic Games, Tokyo, Japan	26 August 2021	RPC (Russian Paralympic Committee)	At the awards ceremony for gold track cycling medalist Mikhail Astashov, the anthem of the International Paralympic Committee was played instead of Tchaikovsky's Piano Concerto No. 1, which had been agreed on as the anthem for the RPC during Russia's suspension from official Paralympic participation. After the mistake was noticed, a decision was taken to hold the victory ceremony again, with the correct anthem.	Wrong country	Track cycling
2021 European Volleyball Championship	18 September 2021	Slovenia	Before the European Championship semifinal between Poland and Slovenia, the anthem of Serbia was played before the correct anthem of Slovenia was played. Slovenian media accused Poland, the host of the match, of provoking Slovenian players to distract them.	Wrong country	Volleyball
2021 EUBC Youth European Boxing Championships, Budva, Montenegro	23 October 2021	Spain	A version of the Spanish national anthem with lyrics which are no longer included and generally associated with Francoist Spain was played during the award ceremony for gold medallist Rafael Lozano Jr..	Outdated	Boxing
2021–22 Kontinental Hockey League, Helsinki, Finland	22 December 2021	Belarus	Before a match between HC Dinamo Minsk and Jokerit, "Belau rekid", the anthem of Palau, was misidentified and played due to the title's resemblance to the word "Belarus". Jokerit, who hosted the match, was subsequently fined 100 000 rubles by the KHL.	Wrong country	Ice hockey
2021 Africa Cup of Nations, Limbé, Cameroon	12 January 2022	Mauritania	Before a match between Gambia and Mauritania, the country's former national anthem was played; two attempts were made to correct the mistake but failed, as the former anthem repeatedly played.	Outdated	Football
2022 Tournoi de France, Le Havre, France	16 February 2022	Finland	Before a match between Finland and France, the national anthem of Albania was played.	Wrong country	Football
Night boxing in Wrocław, Poland	20 February 2022	Germany	The original first stanza of the German national anthem, which is not part of the official anthem and is usually avoided due to its associations with the Nazi era, was played before the boxing match between Nikodem Jeżewski and Artur Mann.	Outdated	Boxing
2022 IBA Women's World Boxing Championships, Istanbul, Turkey	13 May 2022	Austria	Before a boxing match between Eva Voraberger and Seren Ay Çetin, the national anthem of Austria-Hungary, the Austrian Empire, and the Holy Roman Empire was played.	Outdated	Boxing
2022 European Amateur Boxing Championships, Yerevan, Armenia	30 May 2022	Spain	A version of the Spanish national anthem with lyrics which are no longer included and generally associated with Francoist Spain was played during the award ceremony of gold medallist Martín Molina.	Outdated	Boxing
2022 Asia Rugby Sevens Series, Incheon, South Korea	13 November 2022	Hong Kong	Before a match between Hong Kong and South Korea, "Glory to Hong Kong", a protest anthem from the 2019–2020 Hong Kong protests, was played. The incident led the Hong Kong government to demand an investigation.	Non-anthem – other	Rugby sevens
2022 elections in India	16 November 2022	India	At a political meeting of Bharat Jodo Yatra, the anthem of Nepal was played. When attempting to correct the mistake, "Vande Mataram", India's national song, was played instead of the Indian national anthem. At a third attempt, all five stanzas of Rabindranath Tagore's hymn "Bharoto Bhagyo Bidhata" were played; the anthem only uses the first stanza.	Wrong country/non-anthem – patriotic song	Politics
2022 Asian Classic Powerlifting Championship, Dubai, United Arab Emirates	2 December 2022	Hong Kong	"Glory to Hong Kong" was initially played. After around 15 seconds, gold medal winner Susanna Lin signalled that there was a problem, and organisers then played the "March of the Volunteers" correctly. The incident led the Hong Kong government to demand an investigation.	Non-anthem – other	Powerlifting
2023 Men's Ice Hockey World Championship Division III, Sarajevo, Bosnia and Herzegovina	28 February 2023	Hong Kong	Before a match between Iran and Hong Kong, "Glory to Hong Kong" was played. Some Hong Kong players signalled that there was a problem, and after 90 seconds, the organisers correctly played the "March of the Volunteers".	Non-anthem – other	Ice hockey
2023 ICU International Cheerleading Cup, Orlando, Florida, US	24 April 2023	Chinese Taipei	During the awards ceremony for the coed premier (mixed highest-level) gold medal, China's national anthem was played by mistake instead of the National Flag Anthem of the Republic of China. The Chinese Taipei team leader immediately notified organizers, who stopped the music and played the correct anthem. Spectators and athletes from other teams chanted "TPE" during the delay.	Wrong country	Cheerleading
Indonesia International Basketball Invitational, Jakarta, Indonesia	2 August 2023	United Arab Emirates	The national anthem of Saudi Arabia was played for United Arab Emirates before their match against Syria.	Wrong country	Basketball
UEFA Euro 2024 qualifying tournament, Brussels, Belgium	19 November 2023	Belgium	The national anthem of Sweden was initially played before a match between Belgium and Azerbaijan at the King Baudouin Stadium in Brussels.	Wrong country	Football
2024 World Triathlon Cup, Hong Kong	24 March 2024	United Kingdom	The national anthem of Spain was played for the British gold medal winner Sian Rainsley.	Wrong country	Triathlon
Jaca, Spain	15 June 2024	Spain	A version of the Spanish national anthem with lyrics which are no longer included and generally associated with Francoist Spain was played during the medal ceremony of the Spanish national team.	Outdated	Inline hockey
2024 Summer Olympics, Villeneuve-d'Ascq, France	28 July 2024	South Sudan	Before a basketball match between Puerto Rico and South Sudan, the national anthem of Sudan was initially played.	Wrong country/outdated	Basketball
2024–25 UEFA Nations League, Piraeus, Greece	7 September 2024	Finland	In a match between Greece and Finland, the Finnish national anthem was played at double speed.	Anthem played incorrectly	Football
2024 Saturday’s Hispanic Heritage Match, Austin, Texas	12 October 2024	Panama	Before a football match between Panama and the United States, the national anthem of Panama was replaced by the song "Zumba" by Puerto Rican singer Don Omar.	Non-anthem – foreign popular song	Football
2026 European Men's Handball Championship qualification, Varaždin, Croatia	7 November 2024	Belgium	Before a handball match between Croatia and Belgium, the national anthem of Belgium started playing only after nearly 40 seconds of silence, a Microsoft Windows error sound, and several more seconds of silence.	No music initially played	Handball
2026 European Men's Handball Championship qualification, Varaždin, Croatia	7 November 2024	Croatia	Belgium's anthem briefly played again, until it was switched to the national anthem of Croatia.	Wrong country	Handball
WBA World Heavy Championship, Sofia, Bulgaria	7 December 2024	Germany	The original first stanza of the German national anthem, which is not part of the official anthem and is usually avoided due to its associations with the Nazi era, was played before the boxing match between Kubrat Pulev and Mahmoud Charr.	Outdated	Boxing
2025 ICC Champions Trophy, Lahore, Pakistan	22 February 2025	Australia	The national anthem of India was briefly played before a match between England and Australia.	Wrong country	Cricket
World Masters Athletics Championships, Gainesville, USA	1 April 2025	Spain	During the award ceremony a version of the Spanish national anthem with lyrics which are no longer included and generally associated with Francoist Spain was played.	Outdated	Athletics
2025 IIHF World U18 Championships, USA	23 April 2025	Latvia	After a win against Norway U18, "Dzelzgriezējs" by rock band Līvi was played instead of the Latvian national anthem.	Non-anthem – popular song	Ice hockey
2025 German fire fighters championship	31 July 2025	Germany	At the opening ceremony of the fire fighters championship, the original first stanza of the German national anthem was played. The volunteer responsible for the incident was released from duty.	Outdated	Fire fighters championship
2025 World Rhythmic Gymnastics Championships, Rio de Janeiro, Brazil	22 August 2025	Germany	At the all-around medal ceremony following Darja Varfolomeev’s gold-medal win, the national anthem of Georgia was mistakenly played instead of the German anthem.	Wrong country	Rhythmic gymnastics
2025 Men's Asia Cup, UAE	14 September 2025	Pakistan	Before a cricket match between India and Pakistan, first few seconds of the song "Jalebi Baby" by Tesher was played instead of the Pakistani national anthem.	Non-anthem – foreign popular song	Cricket
Plenary session of the Supreme Court of Mexico	24 October 2025	Mexico	At the closing ceremony of a session of the Supreme Court, the song "Qué precio tiene el cielo?" by salsa singer Marc Anthony was initially played instead of the Mexican national anthem.	Non-anthem – foreign popular song	Judiciary
2026 UEFA Women's Under-19 Championship qualification, Bulgaria	26 November 2025	Republic of Ireland	Before a 2026 UEFA Women's Under-19 Championship qualification football match between Republic of Ireland Women's U19 team and Sweden Women's U19 team in Bulgaria, instead of Amhrán na bhFiann, the Irish national anthem, God Save the King, the English and Northern Irish national anthem was played initially, before being cutoff. The Bulgarian hosts did not have the Irish national anthem so the players had to sing it themselves with no music.	Wrong country/outdated	Football
2027 FIFA Women's World Cup qualification (UEFA), Gdańsk, Poland	3 March 2026	Poland	After the Dutch national anthem had been played before the match, the organisers accidentally played the Dutch anthem again for about four seconds when the Polish anthem, Poland Is Not Yet Lost, was supposed to begin. The mistake was noticed and the correct Polish anthem was played shortly afterward.	Wrong anthem (repetition)	Football
Campeonato Brasileiro Série B, Campinas, Brazil	24 April 2026	Brazil	Before the match between Ponte Preta and América Mineiro at Estádio Moisés Lucarelli, instead of the Brazilian national anthem, a song by the pagode group Menos é Mais was mistakenly played.	Non-anthem – popular song	Football
Friendly match between Argentina and Honduras, College Station, Texas, United States	6 June 2026	Argentina	Before the match between Argentina and Honduras at Kyle Field, instead of the Argentinian National Anthem, a song by the cumbia santafesina group Los Palmeras; "El Bombón Asesino" was mistakenly played.	Non-anthem – popular song	Football
2026 Rhythmic Gymnastics World Challenge Cup, Cluj-Napoca, Romania	28 June 2026	Ukraine	After Taisiia Onofriichuk took gold with her hoop routine, Mazurek Dąbrowskiego, the anthem of Poland, was played at the award ceremony, likely due to the fact that it was supposed to be played later for Liliana Lewińska. The mistake was corrected shortly thereafter, and the State Anthem of Ukraine was put on.	Wrong country	Rhythmic gymnastics
2026 World Orienteering Championships, Genoa, Italy	7 July 2026	Switzerland	At the medal ceremony following Simona Aebersold's gold medal win in sprint orienteering, the organizers played a song with the same melody as the Swiss national anthem but with unknown lyrics.	Non-anthem – other	Orienteering
2026 Paulistão F Petrobras, São Paulo, Brazil	29 July 2026	Brazil	During the final part of the Brazilian national anthem's performance, it was briefly interrupted by a ringing cell phone echoing through the stadium.	Non-anthem – other	Football
2026 Asian Games, Kakamigahara, Japan	18 September 2026	South Korea	Prior to the start of men's field hockey match between South Korea and Bangladesh at Gifu Prefectural Green Stadium, the organizers played national anthem of North Korea for the South Korean team.	Wrong country	Field hockey
2026 Asian Games, Kasugai and Inazawa, Japan	19 September 2026	Hong Kong; South Korea	Neither anthem was played.	No music played	Handball
2026 Bahrain Grand Prix in Malaysia, Sepang, Malaysia	4 October 2026	Netherlands	During the podium ceremony, national anthem of Netherlands for the race winner Max Verstappen was delayed and fans started to chant Carte Blanq & Maxx Power's "33 Max Verstappen" song during an "awkward" silence. Shortly after, the correct anthem was played.	No music played; Non-anthem – popular song	Auto racing
2026 Asian Para Games, Nagoya, Japan	19 October 2026	Chinese Taipei; Mongolia	The national anthem of Iran was played in entirety for the gold medalist of men's K44 58 kg in para taekwondo representing Chinese Taipei during the medal ceremony. The same anthem was also played for the gold medalist of women's K44 52 kg from Mongolia, but stopped midway after the Mongolian delegation pointed out the mistake.	Wrong country	Para taekwondo
2026 Asian Para Games, Okazaki, Japan	19 October 2026	China	Prior to the women's sitting volleyball match between China and Iran, the national anthem of South Korea was played for about 5 seconds before switching to the Chinese anthem.	Wrong country	Sitting volleyball

== See also ==
- List of national anthems
- List of former national anthems
- List of regional anthems
