= Slav'sya otechestvo, nashe svobodnoye =

Slav'sya otechestvo, nashe svobodnoye may refer to:

- State Anthem of the Soviet Union
- State Anthem of the Russian Federation
