= Russia Day =

National holiday of the Russian Federation (12 June)

День России Russia Day
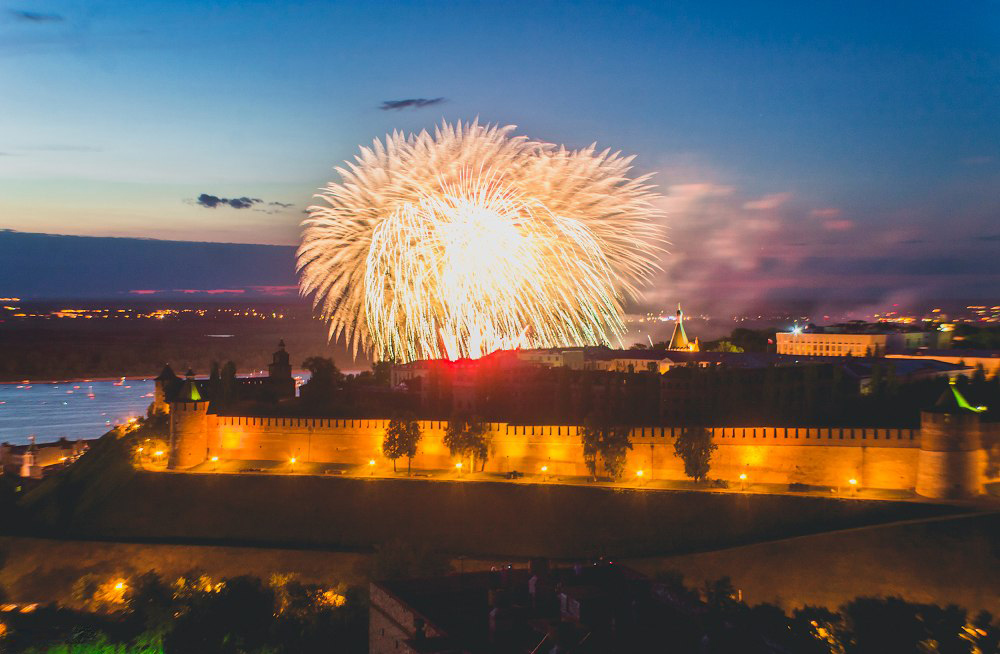
- Fireworks during celebrations in Nizhny Novgorod Kremlin, 2015
- Observed by: Russians
- Type: National Day
- Celebrations: Flag hoisting, parades, fireworks, award ceremonies, singing patriotic songs and the national anthem, speeches by the President, entertainment and cultural programs
- Date: 12 June
- Next time: 12 June 2027
- Frequency: Annual
- Related to: Declaration of State Sovereignty of the Russian Federation

Russia Day (Russian: День России, romanized: Den' Rossii), called Day of Adoption of the Declaration of State Sovereignty of RSFSR (Russian: День принятия Декларации о государственном суверенитете РСФСР, romanized: Den' prinyatia Declaratsii o gosudarstvennom suverenitete RSFSR) before 2002, is the national holiday of Russia. It has been celebrated annually on 12 June since 1992; the day commemorates the adoption of the Declaration of State Sovereignty of the Russian Soviet Federative Socialist Republic (RSFSR) on 12 June 1990. The passage of this Declaration by the First Congress of People's Deputies marked the beginning of constitutional reform in the Russian Soviet state, culminating in outright independence in 1991.

== Etymology ==
According to some surveys, many Russians think that this holiday is Russia's Independence Day, but the holiday has never had such a name in official documents. According to the survey of Levada Center in May 2003, 65 percent of the respondents named the holiday as the Independence Day of Russia.

== History ==
With the creation of the post of the President of the Russian Federation and the adoption of the new Russian Constitution to reflect the new political reality, the national flag, anthem, and emblem of the Russian Federation were major landmarks in the consolidation of Russian statehood. The country's new name, the Russian Federation, was adopted on 25 December 1991. In 1992, the Supreme Soviet of Russia proclaimed 12 June as a national holiday. By presidential decree on 2 June 1994, the date was again proclaimed Russia's national holiday. Under a subsequent presidential decree on 16 June 1998, the holiday was officially named "Russia Day". In 2002, the new Labour Code gave its official seal to this title.

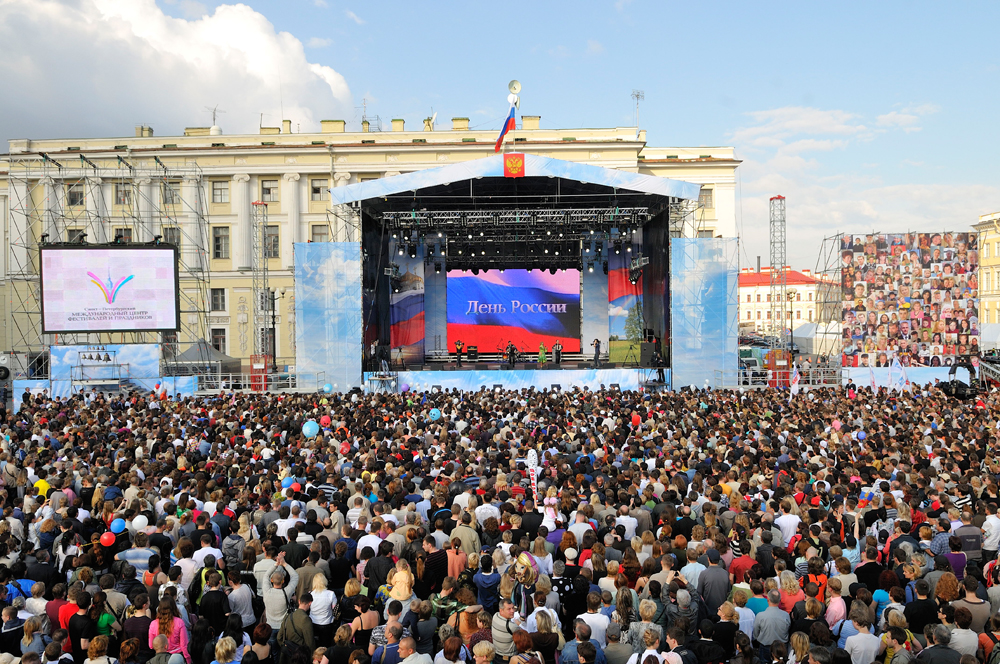
Russia Day celebrations in Saint Petersburg, 2007.

In 2019, the self-proclaimed Donetsk People's Republic proclaimed Russia Day a "state holiday".

== Customs ==
People may attend concerts and fireworks that take place in many cities throughout the country. Prominent Russian writers, scientists and humanitarian workers receive State Awards from the President of Russia on this day. Most public offices and schools are closed on 12 June. If the day falls on a weekend, the public holiday shifts to the following Monday.

However, many Russians see Russia Day only as a holiday. As it commemorates the Soviet Union's dissolution, it brings back bitter memories for some. This is because the dissolution coincided with severe unemployment, high crime and poverty, and the loss of superpower status.

In 2002, about 5000 representatives from across the country took part in the pageantry from Tverskaya Zastava to Manezh Square. The highlight of the Day of Russia-2003 was the air show, which included aerobatic teams "Russian Knights" and "Swifts". Sukhoi and MiG planes left a trail forming the Russian flag. On 12 June 2004 at Red Square a historical military parade was held. Its members, soldiers of the Russian army and representatives of 89 regions, dressed in national costumes, presented the audience the most significant milestones of Russian history. In 2007 celebrations occurred in a hundreds of cities. For example, in Krasnoyarsk action thousands of people in white, blue and red robes formed more than a kilometer long tricolor.

Russia Day in 2008 was celebrated for three days from 11 to 14 June. In Tomsk a "Wooden Carnival" displayed a massive wooden Russian ruble, one hundred times the size of the coin. In Samara enthusiasts reconstructed forces of Minin and Pozharsky from the 1612 Polish–Muscovite War. In Moscow, the holiday included a three-hour concert and concluded a six-month contest over the "Seven Wonders of Russia". In Red Square twenty lines of stage pyrotechnics and confetti cannons were arranged in the colours of the Russian flag.

In 2009 residents of Volgograd formed a map of the country covering 127 square meters. In Sevastopol, youths passed through the city center carrying a 30-meter flag of Russia. In Moscow, at Revolution Square that day a two-meter Khokhloma doll was painted. For the first time at the Ostankino Tower the state flag was displayed.
