= October Park =

Apna Bhadohi

October Park of Culture and Leisure
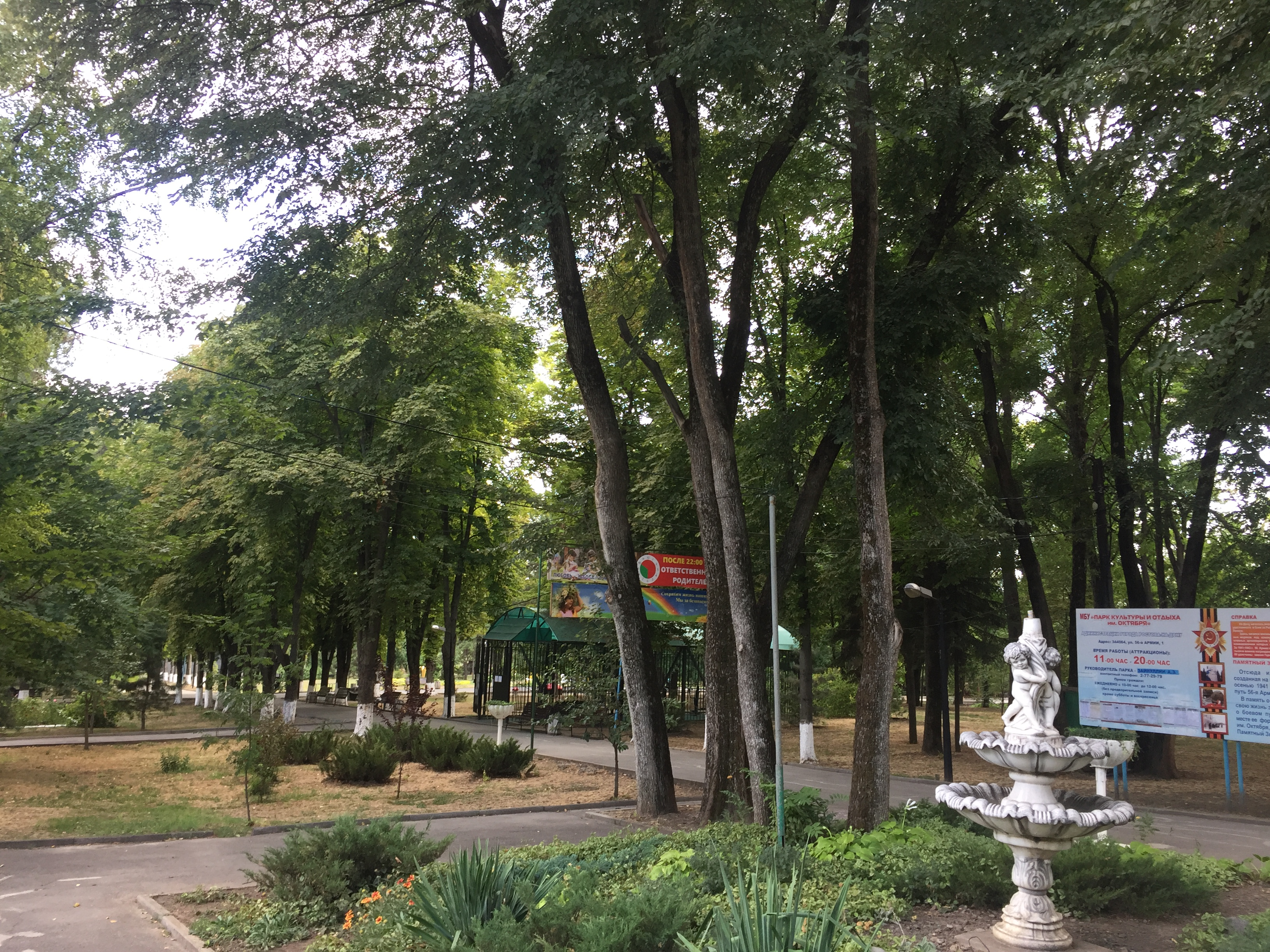
- Interactive map of October Park of Culture and Leisure
- Location: Rostov-on-Don, Russia
- Coordinates: 47.260°N 39.682°E
- Area: 72 hectares (180 acres)
- Created: 1971

October Park of Culture and Leisure (Russian: Парк Культуры и Отдыха имени Октября, ПКиО имени Октября) is a cultural and educational place located in Oktyabrsky District of Rostov-on-Don, Russia.

== History ==
October park was established in 1971.

In 2013 a problem related with disrepair of sewer system of the park must have been solved. It caused appearance of unpleasant smells and sanitary pollution of the territory. Steps by the central entrance to the park were reconstructed in summer of the same year. During spring period around 40 tree species including ash, spruce, sorbus and syringa were planted there.

October park of Rostov-on-Don is a field where cultural and recreational events are periodically held. Among them there is Flag Day, Russia Day, Victory Day, Child Protection Day, etc. In winter period a lot of New Year children's celebrations take place here.
