= Asya Sultanova =

Azerbaijani composer (1923–2021)

Asya Bakhish Sultanova (16 October 1923 – 22 November 2021) was an Azerbaijani composer who is best known for her works for children and her collaboration with singer Muslim Magomayev.

== Biography ==
Sultanova was born in Baku. Her father was a geologist, and her mother was an English teacher. She studied at the Azerbaijan Conservatory from 1942 to 1944, and at the Moscow Conservatory, where she graduated in 1950. She remained in Moscow after graduating and lived there until her death. Her teachers included Evgeny Golubev and Vissarion Shebalin, who encouraged her to incorporate Azerbaijani folk tunes in her music. She was also mentored by Azerbaijani composer Kara Karaev.

Sultanova married, then divorced, musician and actor Vladimir Shainsky. She presented recitals throughout the Soviet Union, and worked at a film studio. She first heard Muslim Magomayev sing in 1963. They collaborated on three songs, and she introduced him to Armenian composer Arno Babajanyan.

In 1967, Sultanova was awarded the title “Honored Worker of Azerbaijan.” During an interview in 2014, she estimated that she had composed 80 songs, and discussed her current project, “Ode to Friendship of Peoples.” She said, “Peace is needed on Earth - that’s what matters.”

Sultanova composed music for texts by Gabriel El-Registan, Elchin Safarli, and others.

She died on 22 November 2021, at the age of 98.

== Compositions ==
=== Chamber ===
- Variations (violin and piano)

=== Orchestra ===
- Concert March
- Waltz

=== Piano ===
- Sonata No. 1
- Sonata No. 2
- Sonatina
- Twelve Pieces for Children

=== Vocal ===
- “If You are With Me” (with Muslim Magomayev)
- “Russia”
- “Stars of Baku” (with Muslim Magomayev)
- “The Man I am Waiting For” (with Muslim Magomayev)
