= Elchin Safarli =

Azerbaijani novelist and writer (born 1984)

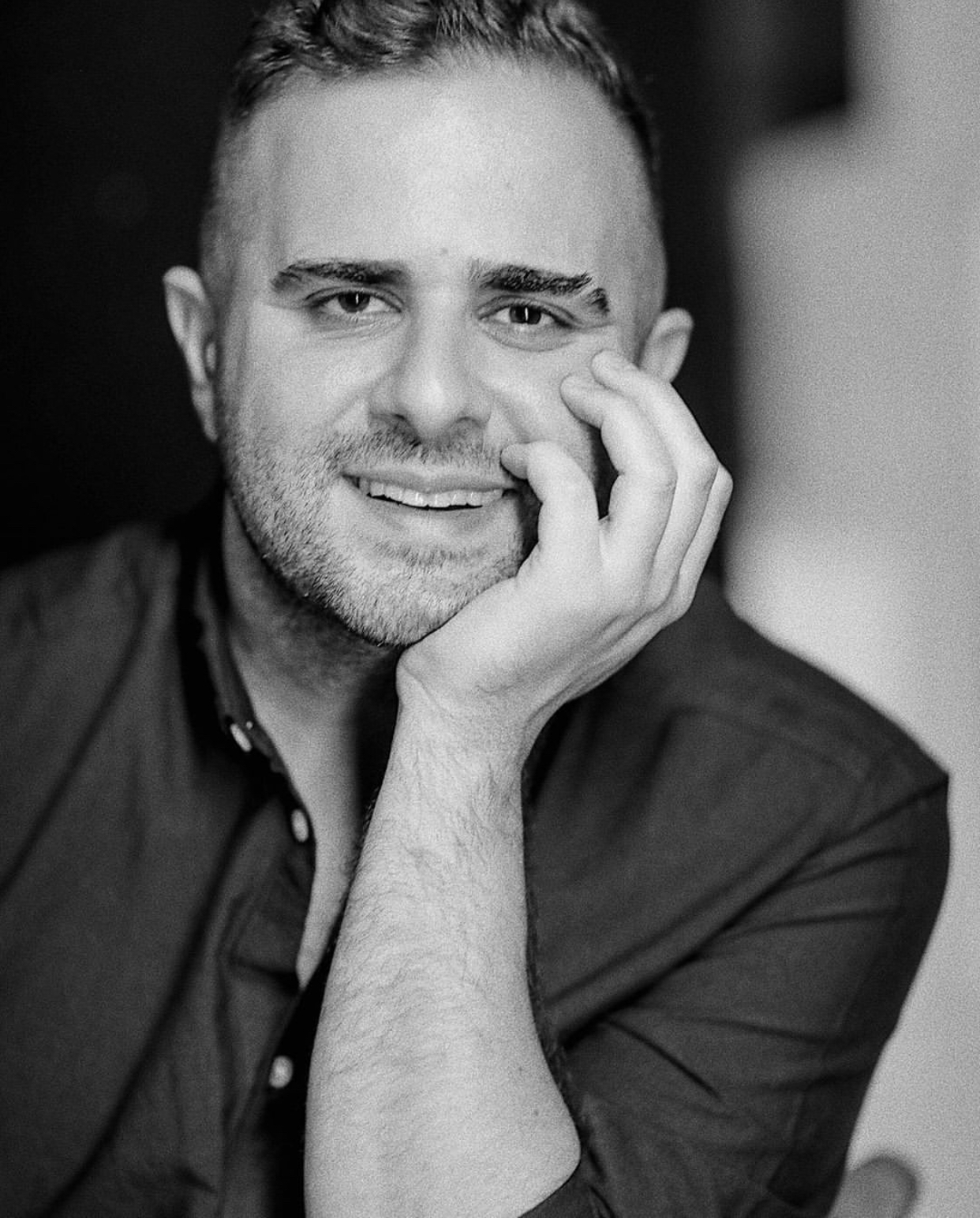
- Born: Elçin Səfərli; 12 March 1984 (age 42); Baku, Azerbaijani SSR, USSR
- Occupation: Novelist
- Writing career
- Genres: Romantic fiction Romantic-drama

Elchin Safarli (Azerbaijani: Elçin Səfərli, Russian: Эльчин Сафарли; born 12 March 1984 in Baku, Azerbaijani SSR, USSR) is an Azerbaijani novelist and journalist. He has published ten novels, written and published in Russian. Composer Asya Sultanova set some of his work to music.

== Published works ==
- Сладкая соль Босфора Sladkaya sol Bosfora (2008)
- Туда без обратно Tuda bez Obratno (2008)
- Я вернусь Ya vernus (2009)
- Мне тебя обещали Mne tebya obeshali (2010)
- Нет воспоминаний без тебя Net vospominaniy bez teba (2010)
- Тысяча и две ночи: Наши на Востоке Tisyacha i Dve Nochi: Nashi na Vostoke (2010)
- Legendy Bosfora (2012)
- Если бы ты знал Esli bi ti znal (If you only knew) (2012)
- Когда я без тебя Kogda ya bez tebya (2012)
- Рецепты счастья Resepty Schastya (2013)
- Я хочу домой Ya hachu domoy (2015)
- Расскажи мне о море Rasskazhi mne o more (2016)
- Когда я вернусь, будь дома 2017
