= Ali Squalli Houssaini =

Moroccan writer, author of the national anthem (1932–2018)

Ali Squalli Houssaini (1932 in Fez – November 5, 2018) was the author of the lyrics of the national anthem of Morocco, "Cherifian Anthem", which he wrote in 1970. He was also the author of numerous books.

A member of the Union of Moroccan Writers since 1967, Squalli received the Morocco Grand Prize in 1982 and the international prize of King Faisal of Saudi Arabia in children's literature in 1992.

== Career ==
Ali Squalli Houssaini was born in 1932 in Fez. He pursued his education at Al-Qarawiyyin University, where he obtained a degree in literature in 1951 and was appointed a professor at the same university. In 1956, he joined the Royal Court, where he was appointed advisor to the Ministry of Foreign Affairs. In 1971, he was appointed Inspector General at the Ministry of National Education.
