= El-Registan =

Soviet poet and lyricist (1899–1945)

Gabriel Arkadyevich Ureklyan (Russian: Габриэль Аркадьевич Уреклян; Armenian: Գաբրիել Էլ-Ռեգիստան; 15 December 1899 – 30 June 1945), better known as El-Registan (Эль-Регистан), was a Soviet Armenian poet best known for having co-written the lyrics to the State Anthem of the Soviet Union along with Sergey Mikhalkov.

== Biography ==
He was born into an Armenian banker's family in Samarkand, in the Samarkand Oblast of the Russian Empire (present-day Uzbekistan). His father, Arshak (Russified to Arkadi) Ureklyan, fled to Tiflis from Ottoman-ruled Armenia in 1890s due to the Hamidian massacres, and subsequently moved to Samarkand. He took the Bolshevik side during the Russian Civil War and the subsequent Soviet takeover of Central Asia. Embarking on a career as a reporter and writer, he adopted the nickname El-Registan, which was composed of a part of his first name and the Samarkand's most famous landmark, Registan. He worked in several prominent Central Asian newspapers, including Pravda Vostoka in Tashkent. He achieved prominence as a talented reporter and was invited to move to Moscow to work for the Izvestia. From there, he covered the massive Soviet construction and heavy industry-building campaigns and became a prominent propagandist, covering topics such as the White Sea–Baltic Canal and Uralmash. He also wrote movie scripts and radio plays, and El-Registan is perhaps better known for his script of the Soviet film Djulbars (1935). The composer Asya Sultanova set some of his work to music.

After the Nazi invasion of the Soviet Union in June 1941, El-Registan became a special war correspondent, frequently traveling to front lines. He attracted the attention of Joseph Stalin, and when he submitted his draft of the new Soviet anthem, written in collaboration with Sergey Mikhalkov, Stalin personally chose the draft and instructed the authors on the changes to be made. Eventually, it was adopted as the national anthem of the Soviet Union in 1944.

He was married to Valentina Galanina, an actress in Moscow. El-Registan died in Moscow on 30 June 1945 and is buried in the Novodevichye Cemetery.
