= Cherifian Anthem =

National anthem of Morocco

an-Našīd al-Waṭanīy al-Maġhribī izli anamur amɣribi
English: National Anthem of Morocco
- النشيد الوطني المغربي ⵉⵣⵍⵉ ⴰⵏⴰⵎⵓⵔ ⴰⵎⵖⵔⵉⴱⵉ
- National anthem of Morocco
- Lyrics: Ali Squalli Houssaini, 1970
- Music: Léo Morgan, 1952
- Adopted: 1956

Audio sample
- U.S. Navy Band instrumental version in F minor: file; help

The Cherifian Anthem (Arabic: النشيد الشريف, romanized: an-našīd aš-šarīf) (Note: officially the National Anthem of Morocco (Arabic: النشيد الوطني المغربي, romanized: an-Našīd al-Waṭanīy āl-Maḡhribi).) is the national anthem of Morocco. Composed by French military officer and chief of music for the Moroccan Royal Guard Léo Morgan, it has been in use since the French protectorate period. Lyrics were written for it by the Moroccan author and poet Professor Ali Squalli Houssaini and adopted in 1970.

== History ==
The anthem's melody was composed by Léo Morgan, a French military officer and chief of music for the Moroccan royal guard, during the French protectorate. The anthem was believed to have been composed in 1952, four years before Morocco's independence in 1956.

After the Moroccan national football team qualified for the 1970 FIFA World Cup for the first time, the idea to write lyrics for the anthem was proposed. Lyrics by writer Ali Squalli Houssaini were either chosen as part of a competition by King Hassan II, or by direct commission of the king to write the lyrics.

== Lyrics ==
Arabic original

مَنْبِتَ الْأَحْرَارْ
مَشْرِقَ الْأَنْوَارْ
مُنْتَدَى السُّؤْدَدِ وَحِمَاه
دُمْتَ مُنْتَدَاه وَحِمَاه
عِشْتَ فِي الْأَوْطَانْ
لِلْعُلَىٰ عُنْوَانْ
مِلْءَ كُلِّ جَنَانْ
ذِكْرَىٰ كُلِّ لِسَانْ
بِالرُّوحِ
بِالْجَسَدِ
هَبَّ فَتَاكْ
لَبَّىٰ نِدَاكْ
فِي فَمِي وَفِي دَمِي
هَوَاكَ ثَارَ نُورْ وَنَارْ
إِخْوَتِي هَيَّا
لِلْعُلَىٰ سَعْيَا
نُشْهِدِ الدُّنْيَا
أَنَّا هُنَا نَحْيَا
بِشِعَارْ
اَللَّٰه اَلْوَطَنْ اَلْمَلِكْ

Romanisation

Manbita l-ʾaḥrār
Mašriqa l-ʾanwār
Muntadā s-suʾdadi wa-ḥimāh
Dumta muntadāh wa-ḥimāh
ʿIšta fi l-ʾawṭān
Li-l-ʿulā ʿunwān
Milʾa kulli ǧanān
Ḏikrā kulli lisān
Bi-r-rūḥi,
Bi-l-jasadi
Habba fatāk,
Labbā nidāk
Fī famī wa-fī damī
Hawāka ṯāra nūr wa-nār
ʾIḫwatī hayyā
Li-l-ʿulā saʿyā
Nušhidi d-dunyā
ʾAnnā hunā naḥyā
Bi-šiʿār
Allāh, al-waṭan, al-malik.

IPA transcription (Note: See Help:IPA/Arabic and Moroccan Arabic § Phonology.)

[mæn.bi.tˢæ‿l.ʔɑħ.rɑːr]
[mæʃ.rɪ.qɑ‿l.ʔæn.wɑːr]
[mʊn.tˢæ.dæː‿s.suʔ.dæ.di wɑ.ħi.mæːh]
[dʊm.tˢæ mʊn.tˢæ.dæːh wɑ.ħi.mæːh]
[ʕɪʃ.tˢæ fɪ‿l.ʔɑw.tˤɑːn]
[lɪ‿l.ʕʊ.læː ʕʊn.wæːn]
[mɪl.ʔæ kul.lɪ ʒæ.næːn]
[d̪ɪk.rɑː kul.lɪ li.sæːn]
[bɪ‿r.ruː.ħi |]
[bɪ‿l.ʒæ.sæ.di]
[hæb.bæ fæ.tˢæːk]
[læb.bæː ni.dæːk]
[fiː fæ.miː wɑ.fiː dæ.miː]
[hæ.wɑː.kæ t̪ɑː.rɑ nʊːr wɑ‿nɑːr]
[ʔɪχ.wɑ.tˢiː hæj.jɑː]
[lɪ‿l.ʕʊ.læː sæʕ.jɑː]
[nʊʃ.hɪ.dɪ‿d.dʊn.jɑː]
[ʔæn.næː hu.næː nɑħ.jɑː]
[bɪ‿ʃɪ.ʕɑːr]
[ɑɫ.ɫɑːh | æl.wɑ.tˤɑn | æl.mæ.lik]

English translation

Root of the free,
Rising place of the Lights,
Forum of glory and its protector,
May you perpetuate as its forum and its protector.
May you live among the homelands
As an address for grandeur
Filling every garden
conveyed by every tongue.
With the spirit,
With the body,
Your son has come
To answer your call.
In my mouth and in my blood,
Your love stirred up as light and fire.
Let's go brothers!
Heading for grandeur,
Making the world witness
That we here perpetually live
With the motto:
God, Homeland, King.
