= The Patriotic Song (anthem) =

National anthem of Russia from 1991 to 2000

Patriotícheskaya pésnya
English: The Patriotic Song
- Патриотическая песня
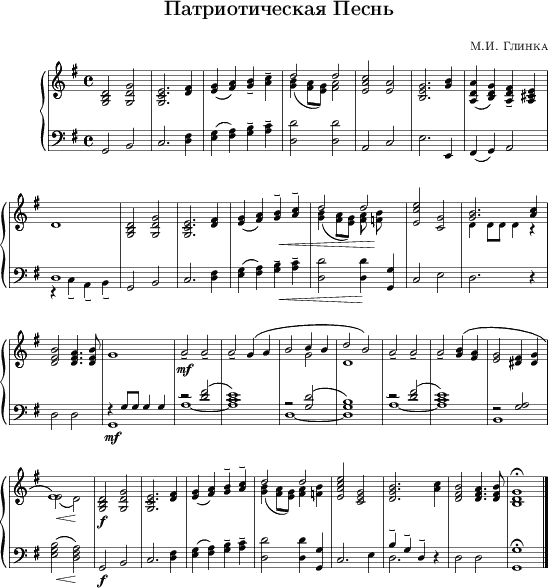
- Former national anthem of Russia Former regional anthem of the Russian SFSR
- Also known as: Motif de chant national (original title)
- Music: Mikhail Glinka, 1833; 1944 (arranged by Mikhail Bagrinavskiy)
- Adopted: 23 November 1990 (by the Russian Soviet Federative Socialist Republic)
- Readopted: 25 December 1993 (by the Russian Federation)
- Relinquished: 27 December 2000
- Preceded by: "State Anthem of the Soviet Union"
- Succeeded by: "State Anthem of the Russian Federation"

Audio sample
- A-flat major instrumental rendition performed by the Brass Band of the Russian Ministry of Defense: file; help

"The Patriotic Song" (Note: Russian: Патриотическая песня, romanized: Patriotíchiskaya pésnya, IPA: [pətrʲɪɐˈtʲitɕɪskəjə ˈpʲesʲnʲə]) was the national anthem of Russia from 1991 to 2000. It was also previously used as the regional anthem of the Russian Soviet Federative Socialist Republic from 1990 – replacing the State Anthem of the Soviet Union – until 1991, when it transformed into the Russian Federation after the dissolution of the Soviet Union. Unlike most national anthems, it had no official lyrics. Although unofficial ones were written for it, they were never adopted.

== Etymology ==
"The Patriotic Song" was originally a piano composition without lyrics, composed by Mikhail Glinka (1804–1857), and it was originally titled "National Song Motif" (French: Motif de chant national). The song has been known under its current title of "The Patriotic Song" since 1944, after Glinka's composition was arranged for orchestra by composer Mikhail Bagrinovskiy under that name, popularizing it and leading it to become synonymous with Glinka's original work itself.

== History ==
First performance as the regional anthem of the Russian Soviet Federative Socialist Republic as part of the "Decree of November 23, 1990" requesting to perform it on November 27, 1990 at the Kremlin.

U.S.-performed rendition during a Russian state visit to Washington, D.C. in 1992 with simultaneous 21-gun salute

U.S. Army rendition performed the 1994 FIFA World Cup at a match between Russia and Brazil on 20 June 1994.

U.S. Army rendition performed the 1994 FIFA World Cup at a match between Russia and Sweden on 24 June 1994.

U.S. Navy Band performance at the 1994 FIFA World Cup at a match between Russia and Cameroon on 28 June 1994.

A performance of Patrioticheskaya Pesnya at the inauguration of Russian president Vladimir Putin on 7 May 2000

Initially, "The Patriotic Song" was a composition for piano without lyrics, written by Mikhail Glinka in 1833 and titled (in French) "Motif de chant national". It was often claimed that it was written by Glinka as part of a national anthem contest or with the intent of becoming a national anthem, though evidence for either claim is scant. In 1885, Glinka's manuscript was re-discovered after languishing in obscurity at the Russian National Library in St. Petersburg. In 1944, it was arranged for orchestra by composer Mikhail Bagrinovsky under the Russian-language title "Patrioticheskaya Pesnya" and a few years later, poet Alexei Mashistov set lyrics to Bagrinovsky's arrangement of Glinka's composition for a song dedicated to the Soviet capital of Moscow, both of which helped popularize Glinka's work among the Soviet public and gave it its common contemporary moniker.

The Soviet and Russian TV news program Vremya used it as its theme tune from 2 January 1984, to 10 May 1986.

In the 1990s, President Boris Yeltsin chose the tune as the new state anthem of the Russian SFSR and it was officially adopted as such on 23 November 1990, by the Supreme Soviet of Russia. It also became a wordless anthem of opposition to the collapsing communist rule and was played against the coup during the August 1991 coup attempt. It remained in de facto usage through inertia by the new Russian Federation from 1991 until its official confirmation as the state's national anthem in 1993 when the Russian constitution was enacted. Also favored by the Russian Orthodox Church, the music went without lyrics for several years. This was despite there being over six thousand submissions over the period of ten years. In 1999, Viktor Radugin won a contest to provide suitable words for it with his poem "Glory to Russia!" (Russian: Славься, Россия!, romanized: Slávsya, Rossíya!). However, no lyrics and none of the entries were ever adopted.

It reportedly proved to be unpopular with the Russian public and with many politicians and public figures, because of its tune and lack of lyrics, and consequently its inability to inspire Russian athletes during international competitions. One key driver for the changing of the Russian anthem away from the Patriotic Song was when players from the Russian football club Spartak Moscow sent a letter to Vladimir Putin in the summer of 2000 requesting an alternative to the wordless anthem to inspire their morale. The other driver of change came from Russian Olympians, who requested a shift away from the Patriotic Song as they felt "embarrassed to be the only ones whose lips did not move as their national anthem was performed".

It was subsequently replaced soon after Yeltsin's successor as President of the Russian Federation, Vladimir Putin, first took office on 7 May 2000. After conducting a nationwide poll on 13 November 2000, the subsequent results concluded that only an abysmal 15% of Russians supported the Patriotic Song. This poll made it clear that change was inevitable. Therefore, on 8 December 2000, the federal legislature established and approved the music of the National Anthem of the Soviet Union with newly written lyrics through a vote of 381 to 51. Still, despite overwhelming support for this change, Yeltsin himself criticized Putin for supporting the semi-reintroduction of the Soviet-era national anthem.

Today, the song is used by some elements of the Russian opposition as a political anthem. It is also sometimes erroneously played during sporting events involving Russia.

== Proposed lyrics ==
=== "Glory to Russia!" ===
These are the unofficial lyrics to "The Patriotic Song" by Viktor Radugin, titled "Glory to Russia!" (Славься, Россия!). It has been confused with the closing chorus of Glinka's opera A Life for the Tsar, possibly due to both beginning with the same word glory (славься), but the two works are unrelated with the latter being derived from an old Polish folk song (though the operatic music, too, has been suggested as a candidate for a Russian national anthem).

Version with proposed Glory to Russia! lyrics

Russian original

Славься, славься, родина-Россия!
Сквозь века и грозы ты прошла
И сияет солнце над тобою
И судьба твоя светла.

Над старинным московским Кремлём
Вьётся знамя с двуглавым орлом
И звучат священные слова:
«Славься, Русь – Отчизна моя!»

Romanization of Russian

Slávsya, slávsya, ródina-Rossíya!
Skvoz veká i grózy ty proshlá!
I siyáyet sólnce nad tobóyu
I sudbá tvoyá svetlá!

Nad starínnym moskóvskim Kremlyóm
Vyyótsya známya s dvuglávym orlóm
I zvuchát svyashchénnyye slová:
„Slávsya, Rus – Otchízna moyá!“

IPA transcription

[ˈsɫafʲsʲə ˈsɫafʲsʲə ˈrodʲɪnə rɐˈsʲijə ‖]
[skvozʲ vʲɪˈka i ˈɡrozɨ tɨ prɐˈʂɫa ‖]
[i sʲɪˈjæ(j)ɪt ˈsont͡sə nat tɐˈbojʊ]
[i sʊdʲˈba tvɐˈja svʲɪˈtɫa ‖]

[nat stɐˈrʲinːɨm mɐˈskofskʲɪm krʲɪˈmlʲɵm]
[ˈvʲjɵtsːə ˈznamʲə z‿dvʊˈɡɫa.vɨm ɐrˈɫom]
[i zvʊˈt͡ɕat svʲɪˈɕːenːɨ(j)ɪ sɫɐˈva]
[ˈsɫafʲsʲə rusʲ‿ɐtˈt͡ɕiznə mɐˈja ‖]

English translation

Glory! Glory to Mother Russia!
You've passed through centuries, through storms!
And upon you the sun shines,
And bright is your fate.

Above the ancient Moscow Kremlin,
A two-headed eagle flag soars.
And the sacred words sound:
"Glory to Russia – my Fatherland!"

=== "Majestically Above the Fatherland" ===
"Majestically Above the Fatherland" (Russian: Над Отчизной величаво, romanized: Nad Otchíznoy velichávo) written by Vladimir Kalinkin in 1998, was another proposed set of lyrics. Performed by Russian artist Vladimir Detayov, the Duma was made aware of this piece's existence in April 1999. At the initiative of the Ministry of Ethnic Policy of Russia, this record was first publicly presented at the First Congress of the Assembly of Peoples of Russia. During the summer of that year, it was performed on the radio station "Radio of Russia" and the TV channel "Moskoviya", devoted to writing a text for the national anthem.

In January 2000, it was carried out in a new orchestral arrangement performed by the N.P. Osipov National Academic Orchestra of Folk Instruments and the A.V. Sveshnikov Academic Choir. Overall the song received positive reviews, although like "Glory to Russia!", never attained official status.

Russian original

Припев:
Над Отчизной величаво –
Башни древнего Кремля.
Славься, прадедов держава,
Вся Российская земля!

Ты – духовностью богата
И соборностью крепка –
По крупице, трудно, свято
Собиралась на века.

Единением народов
Нерушима и сильна,
Одолеет все невзгоды
Наша мудрая страна.

Припев

Romanization of Russian

Pripév:
Nad Otchíznoy velichávo –
Báshni drévnego Kremlyá.
Slávsya, prádedov derzháva,
Vsya Rossíyskaya zemlyá!

Ty – dúkhovnostyyu bogáta
I sobórnostyyu krepká –
Po krupíce, trúdno, svyáto,
Sobirálas na veká.

Yedinéniyem naródov
Nerushíma i silná,
Odoléyet vse nevzgódy
Násha múdraya straná.

Pripév

English translation

Chorus:
Majestically above the Fatherland –
The towers of the ancient Kremlin.
Glory to the state of our forefathers,
All of the Russian land!

You – rich in spirituality
And strong in fellowship –
Gradually, through hardship and holiness,
Have come together forever.

Through unity of its peoples,
Unbreakable and strong,
Our wise country
Will overcome all adversities.

Chorus

=== "The Red Star" (Russian Army Choir) ===
In 1992, a version of "The Patriotic Song" with lyrics specifically about Moscow was sung by the “Red Star" Russian Army Choir and Dance Ensemble of RVSN at the Tchaikovsky Hall.

Russian original

Здравствуй, славная столица!
Сердце Родины, Москва!
Вся страна тобой гордится,
Городов родных глава.

Русь великую сплотила
Ты вокруг твёрдынь Кремля,
И окрепла наша сила,
И прославилась земля.

Romanization of Russian

Zdrávstvuy, slávnaya stolíca!
Sérdce Ródiny, Moskvá!
Vsya straná tobóy gordítsya,
Górodov ródnykh glavá.

Rus velíkuyu splotíla
Ty vokrúg tvyórdyn Kremlyá,
I okrépla násha síla,
I proslávilas zemlyá.

English translation

Hello, glorious capital!
Heart of the Motherland, Moscow!
The whole country is proud of you,
Head of native cities.

You have united great Rus'
Around the strongholds of the Kremlin,
And our power has grown stronger,
And the land has become famous.

=== "Glory to Our Russia for Centuries to Come!" ===
A 103rd anthem candidate (out of 140), titled "Glory to Our Russia for Centuries to Come!" (Russian: На века России нашей – слава!), was prepared by the poet Nina Benson. It was performed by the Big Choir of Radio and Orchestra of the Ministry of Defense conducted by Viktor Afanasiev (recorded in 1998; the draft words and this recording were presented at a presentation in the Duma on 3 February 1998).

Russian original

На века России нашей – слава!
Непреклонно мужество Руси.
Отчий дом и честь храни, Держава,
Флаг свободы гордо неси.

Дух единства, крепи нашу силу,
Светлой верой воспрянет страна.
Правь судьбой, великая Россия,
Славься, Русь, на все времена!

Romanization of Russian

Na veká Rossíyi náshey – sláva!
Nepreklónno múzhestvo Rusí.
Ótchiy dom i chest khráni, Derzháva,
Flag svobódy górdo nesí.

Dukh yedínstva, krépi náshu sílu,
Svétloy véroy vospryánet straná.
Prav sudbóy, velíkaya Rossíya,
Slávsya, Rus, na vse vremená!

English translation

Glory to our Russia for centuries to come!
The resolute courage of Russia.
Preserve thy Father's home and honour, Power,
The flag of freedom is maintained proudly.

Spirit of unity, muster our strength,
The country shall rise with bright faith.
Rule the fate, oh great Russia,
Glory to Russia forevermore!

=== "Glory to Rus'" ===
In May 1991, the artistic director of the ensemble named after Alexandrova, Igor Agafonnikov recorded the anthem with the following text:

Russian original

Славься, Русь – великая страна!
Славься, Русь – свободна и сильна.
Славься Труд, Богатство и Земля,
Расцветай, Отчизна моя!

Присягает российский народ
Конституции прав и свобод
И в душе рождаются слова:
Славься, Русь – Отчизна моя!

Romanization of Russian

Slávsya, Rus – velíkaya straná!
Slávsya, Rus – svobódna i silná.
Slávsya Trud, Bogátstvo i Zemlyá,
Rascvetáy, Otchízna moyá!

Prisyagáyet rossíyskiy naród
Konstitúciyi prav i svobód
I v dushé rozhdáyutsya slová:
Slávsya, Rus – Otchízna moyá!

English translation

Glory, Russia is a great country!
Glory, Russia is free and strong.
Glory to Labor, Wealth and Earth,
Blossom, my Fatherland!

The Russian people swear
Constitutions of rights and freedoms
And the words are born in my soul:
Glory, Russia – my Fatherland!

== See also ==
- "Aegukka"
- "God Save the Tsar!"
- National anthem of Russia
- State Anthem of the Soviet Union
