= State Anthem of the Soviet Union =

Gosudárstvennyy gimn Soyúza Sovétskikh Socialistícheskikh Respúblik
English: State Anthem of the Union of Soviet Socialist Republics
- Государственный гимн Союза Советских Социалистических Республик
- Musical sheet of the anthem
- Former national anthem of the Soviet Union Former regional anthem of the Russian SFSR
- Lyrics: El-Registan (1943); Sergey Mikhalkov (1943 and 1977)
- Music: Alexander Vasilyevich Alexandrov, c. 1938
- Adopted: 15 March 1944; 1956 (as instrumental); 1 September 1977 (with modified lyrics)
- Relinquished: 23 November 1990 (as regional anthem of the Russian SFSR); 26 December 1991 (as national anthem of the Soviet Union)
- Preceded by: "The Internationale"
- Succeeded by: List of successors: Russia: "The Patriotic Song"; Ukraine: "Anthem of the Ukrainian SSR" (no words, until 1992); Belarus: "My Belarusy"; Armenia: "Mer Hayrenik"; Azerbaijan: "Anthem of the Azerbaijan SSR" (no words, until 1992); Georgia: "Dideba"; Kazakhstan: "Anthem of the Republic of Kazakhstan"; Kyrgyzstan: "Anthem of the Kirghiz SSR" (no words, until 1992); Moldova: "Deșteaptă-te, române!"; Tajikistan: "Anthem of the Tajik SSR" (no words, until 1994); Turkmenistan: "Anthem of the Turkmen SSR" (no words, until 1996); Uzbekistan: "State Anthem of Uzbekistan"; Estonia: "Mu isamaa, mu õnn ja rõõm"; Latvia: "Dievs, svētī Latviju!"; Lithuania: "Tautiška giesmė"

Audio sample
- "State Anthem of the Soviet Union" (instrumental): file; help

The State Anthem of the Union of Soviet Socialist Republics (Note: Russian: Государственный гимн Союза Советских Социалистических Республик, romanized: Gosudárstvennyy gimn Soyúza Sovétskikh Socialistícheskikh Respúblik, IPA: [ɡəsʊˈdarstvʲɪn(ː)ɨj ˈɡʲimn sɐˈjuzə sɐˈvʲetskʲɪx sətsɨəlʲɪˈsʲtʲitɕɪskʲɪx rʲɪˈspublʲɪk]) was the national anthem of the Soviet Union and the regional anthem of the Russian Soviet Federative Socialist Republic from 1944 to 1991, replacing "The Internationale". Its original lyrics were written by Sergey Mikhalkov (1913–2009) in collaboration with El-Registan (1899–1945), and its music was composed by Alexander Vasilyevich Alexandrov (1883–1946), initially as the Hymn of the Bolshevik Party. For a two-decade interval following de-Stalinization, the anthem was performed without lyrics. The second set of lyrics, also written by Mikhalkov and in which Joseph Stalin's name was omitted, was adopted in 1977.

A decade after the dissolution of the Soviet Union, the same melody was used for its successor state, as the national anthem of Russia.

== History ==
=== Origins ===
The anthem's music was originally composed by Alexander Alexandrov in 1938 for the Hymn of the Bolshevik Party. Its opening bars were borrowed from one of Alexandrov's previous pieces, "Life Has Become Better", (Note: Russian: Жить стало лучше, romanized: Zhitʹ stalo luchshe, IPA: [ʐɨtʲ ˈstalə ˈlut͡ʂːɨ]) which was based on a quote by former Soviet Union General Secretary Joseph Stalin at the First All-Union Meeting of the Stakhanovites on 17 November 1935.

Other than "Life Has Become Better", the music of the anthem has several possible outside influences. Alexandrov himself has described it as the combination of a march with Russian traditional music, particularly that of bylina epic songs. The anthem shares several chord progressions with Vasily Kalinnikov's overture Bylina, Epic Poem (which, as its name indicates, is also inspired by the bylina tradition). There also exist similarities between Alexandrov's anthem and Robert Schumann's Frühlingsfahrt.

When the Comintern was dissolved in 1943 for the Soviet Union to maintain its alliance with the other Allies of World War II, a new composition was needed to replace "The Internationale" as the national anthem. A contest was held in mid to late 1943 for a new anthem, and more than 200 entries were submitted. Alexandrov's music was personally chosen by Stalin, who both praised and criticized it. The anthem's lyrics then had to be written. Stalin thought the song should be short, and that it should invoke the Red Army's impending victory over the forces of Germany on the Eastern Front. The poets Sergey Mikhalkov and Gabriyel' Arkadyevich Ureklyan were chosen by Stalin's staffers, called to Moscow, and given the task of writing lyrics that referenced not only the Great Patriotic War, but also "a Country of Soviets". The first draft was completed overnight.

The anthem was first published on 7 November 1943. It was played for the first time on Soviet radio at midnight on 1 January 1944, and officially adopted on 15 March the same year. The new lyrics had three refrains following three different stanzas. In each refrain, the second line was modified to refer to friendship, then happiness, then glory. Joseph Stalin and the Soviet Union's war against Germany were originally invoked in the second and third verses, respectively. Reportedly, Stalin was opposed to including his name in the lyrics but relented after some Politburo members insisted.

=== Post-Stalin era ===
With the process of de-Stalinization after Stalin's death, the lyrics referring to him were considered unacceptable, and from 1956 to 1977 the anthem was performed without lyrics. A notable exception took place at the 1976 Canada Cup ice hockey tournament, where singer Roger Doucet insisted on performing the anthem with lyrics after consultations with Russian studies scholars from Université de Montréal and Soviet team officials. In 1977, to coincide with the 60th anniversary of the October Revolution, revised lyrics, written in 1970 by original author Sergey Mikhalkov, were adopted. The varying refrains were replaced by a uniform refrain after all stanzas, and the line praising Stalin was dropped, as were the lines referring to the Great Patriotic War. Another notable change was the replacement of a line referring to the Soviet national flag with one citing the Communist Party of the Soviet Union in the form of "Partiya Lenina" (The party of Lenin). These lyrics were present in both the original and revised party anthems, but in the original, it was followed by the later-redacted "Partiya Stalina" (The party of Stalin).

== Post-1991 use ==
=== Use in the Russian Federation ===
After the dissolution of the Soviet Union in 1991, the Russian Federation adopted a new anthem, the Patriotic Song. It was previously the regional anthem of the Russian Soviet Federative Socialist Republic from 1990 until 1991 (until 1990 it used the State Anthem of the Soviet Union). Unlike most national anthems, it had no official lyrics (although unofficial ones written for it were proposed, they were not adopted).

The Patriotic Song was replaced soon after Vladimir Putin first took office on 7 May 2000. The federal legislature established and approved the music of the National Anthem of the Soviet Union, with newly written lyrics, in December 2000. Boris Yeltsin criticized Putin for supporting the semi-reintroduction of the Soviet-era national anthem, although some opinion polls showed that many Russians favored this decision. In late 2000, the current national anthem of Russia was introduced, which uses the music of the Soviet national anthem with new lyrics by Sergey Mikhalkov, who also wrote both the original Soviet anthem and its remake in 1977.

=== State Union of Russia and Belarus ===
The same music was used for a proposed anthem for the State Union of Russia and Belarus, entitled Derzhavny Soyuz Narodov ("Sovereign Union of Nations"). Its lyrics were not tied to any specific nationality, and there were official versions in the languages of every Soviet republic and several other Soviet languages; thus it could have been adopted by a broader union. However, it was never officially adopted, and there appear to be no plans to utilize it in any official role.

=== Decommunization ===
In some post-Soviet states which adopted decommunization laws banning Communist symbolism, publicly performing the Soviet anthem is illegal. For example, since 2015, offenders in Ukraine face up to five years in prison with the exception of Russian-occupied areas in Ukraine. Similar laws were adopted in Latvia and Lithuania.

== Official translations ==
The anthem has been officially translated into several languages:

| Language | For | Date | Author |
|---|---|---|---|
| Ukrainian | Ukrainian SSR | 1944 | Mykola Bazhan |
| Komi-Permyak | Komi ASSR | 1944 | Sergey Karavayev |
| Hill Mari | Mari ASSR | 1944 | Konstantin Belyayev |
| Azerbaijani | Azerbaijan SSR; Dagestan ASSR | 1944 | Samad Vurgun |
| Georgian | Georgian SSR | 1944 | Otar Egadze, Irakli Abashidze (1977) |
| Kazakh | Kazakh SSR | 1944 | Nygmet Baymuhamedov, Sabit Mukanov, Gabit Musirepov, Gali Ormanov |
| Tajik | Tajik SSR | 1944 | Mirzā Tursunzāda, Mirsaid Mirshakar, Bāqī Rahimzāda, Lāyiq Shēralī |
| Khakas | Khakas AO | 1944 | Alexander Kenel and Mikhail Kilchichakov (1977 version) |
| Tatar | Tatar ASSR | 1944 | Äxmät İsxaq and Nuri Arslanov |
| Lithuanian | Lithuanian SSR | 1944 | Antanas Venclova |
| Latvian | Latvian SSR | 1944 | Ārija Elksne and Andris Vējāns |
| Bashkir | Bashkir ASSR | 1944 | Abdulkhak Igebaev, Ghilemdar Ramazanov and Safuan Alibay |
| Estonian | Estonian SSR | 1944 | Vladimir Beekman |
| Yakut | Yakut ASSR | 1944 | Nikolai Mordinov and Sergey Vasilyev |
| Abkhaz | Abkhaz ASSR | 1944 | Dmitry Gulia |

== Lyrics ==
Soviet Anthem 1943

This table shows the anthem's various lyrics. As there were two official versions (in 1944 and 1977), both are included within their sections.

=== Original version ===
1940s official orchestral and choral vocal recording
Performed by the Alexandrov Ensemble

Russian original

I
Союз нерушимый республик свободных
Сплотила навеки Великая Русь.
Да здравствует созданный волей народов
Единый, могучий Советский Союз!

Припев I:
Славься, Отечество наше свободное,
Дружбы народов надёжный оплот!
Знамя советское, знамя народное
Пусть от победы к победе ведёт!

II
Сквозь грозы сияло нам солнце свободы,
И Ленин великий нам путь озарил:
Нас вырастил Сталин — на верность народу,
На труд и на подвиги нас вдохновил!

Припев II:
Славься, Отечество наше свободное,
Счастья народов надёжный оплот!
Знамя советское, знамя народное
Пусть от победы к победе ведёт!

III
Мы армию нашу растили в сраженьях.
Захватчиков подлых с дороги сметём!
Мы в битвах решаем судьбу поколений,
Мы к славе Отчизну свою поведём!

Припев III:
Славься, Отечество наше свободное,
Славы народов надёжный оплот!
Знамя советское, знамя народное
Пусть от победы к победе ведёт!

Romanization of Russian

I
Sojúz nerushímyj respúblik svobódnykh
Splotíla navéki velíkaja Rus'.
Da zdrávstvujet sózdannyj vólej naródov
Jedínyj, mogúchij Sovétskij Sojúz!

Pripév I:
Sláv'sja, Otéchestvo náshe svobódnoje,
Drúzhby naródov nadjózhnyj oplót!
Známja sovétskoje, známja naródnoje
Pust' ot pobédy k pobéde vedjót!

II
Skvoz' grózy sijálo nam sólnce svobódy,
I Lénin velíkij nam put' ozaríl
Nas výrastil Stálin — na vérnost' naródu,
Na trud i na pódvigi nas vdokhnovíl!

Pripév II:
Sláv'sja, Otéchestvo náshe svobódnoje,
Schást'ja naródov nadjózhnyj oplót!
Známja sovétskoje, známja naródnoje
Pust' ot pobédy k pobéde vedjót!

III
My ármiju náshu rastíli v srazhén'jakh.
Zakhvátchikov pódlykh s dorógi smetjóm!
My v bítvakh reshájem sud'bú pokolénij,
My k sláve Otchíznu svojú povedjóm!

Pripév III:
Sláv'sja, Otéchestvo náshe svobódnoje,
Slávy naródov nadjózhnyj oplót!
Známja sovétskoje, známja naródnoje
Pust' ot pobédy k pobéde vedjót!

IPA transcription as sung (Note: See File:Gimn Sovetskogo Soyuza (1944 Stalinist lyrics).oga, Help:IPA/Russian and Russian phonology.)

1
[sɐ.ˈjuz‿nʲɛ.rʊ.ˈʂɨ.mɨj rʲɪs.ˈpu.blʲɪk svɐ.ˈbod.nɨx]
[spɫɐ.ˈtʲi.ɫa nɐ.ˈvʲɛ.kʲi vʲɛ.ˈlʲi.ka.jɐ rusʲ]
[dɐ‿ˈzdra.stvʊ.jɪt ˈsoz.dan.nɨj ˈvo.lʲej nɐ.ˈro.dɐf]
[jɛ.ˈdʲi.nɨj mɐ.ˈɡu.tɕɪj sɐ.ˈvʲɛt.skʲɪj sɐ.ˈjus]

[prʲɪ.ˈpʲɛf] 1
[ˈsɫaf⁽ʲ⁾.sʲa a.ˈtʲɛ.tɕɪst.va ˈna.ʂɛ sva.ˈbod.na.jɛ]
[ˈdruʐ.bɨ nɐ.ˈro.dɐf nɐ.ˈdʲɵʐ.nɨj ɐ.ˈpɫot]
[ˈzna.mʲa sa.ˈvʲɛt.ska.jɛ ˈzna.mʲa na.ˈrod.na.jɛ]
[pusʲtʲ at pɐ.ˈbʲɛ.dɨ k‿pɐ.ˈbʲɛ.dʲɛ vʲɪ.ˈdʲɵt]

2
[skvɐzʲ‿ˈɡro.zɨ sʲɪ.ˈja.ɫa nam ˈson.tsɛ svɐ.ˈbo.dɨ]
[i ˈlʲɛ.nʲin vʲɛ.ˈlʲi.kʲɪj nam putʲ ɐ.zɐ.ˈrʲiɫ]
[naz‿ˈvɨ.rasʲ.tʲɪɫ ˈsta.lʲin nɐ‿ˈvʲɛr.nasʲtʲ nɐ.ˈro.dʊ]
[nɐ‿trud i nɐ‿ˈpod.vʲɪ.ɡʲɪ naz‿vdɐx.nɐ.ˈvʲiɫ]

[prʲɪ.ˈpʲɛf] 2
[ˈsɫaf⁽ʲ⁾.sʲa a.ˈtʲɛ.tɕɪst.va ˈna.ʂɛ sva.ˈbod.na.jɛ]
[ˈɕːasʲ.tʲja nɐ.ˈro.dɐf nɐ.ˈdʲɵʐ.nɨj ɐ.ˈpɫot]
[ˈzna.mʲa sa.ˈvʲɛt.ska.jɛ ˈzna.mʲa na.ˈrod.na.jɛ]
[pusʲtʲ at pɐ.ˈbʲɛ.dɨ k‿pɐ.ˈbʲɛ.dʲɛ vʲɪ.ˈdʲɵt]

3
[mɨ ˈar.mʲi.jʊ ˈna.ʂʊ rɐsʲ.ˈtʲi.lʲi f‿srɐ.ˈʐɛ.nʲjɐx]
[zɐ.ˈxvat.tɕi.kɐf ˈpod.ɫɨɣ‿z‿dɐ.ˈro.ɡʲi smʲɪ.ˈtʲɵm]
[mɨ ˈv‿bʲit.vax rʲɪ.ˈʂa.jɛm sʊdʲ.ˈbu pa.kɐ.ˈlʲɛ.nʲɪj]
[mɨ ˈk‿sɫa.vʲɛ ɐt.ˈtɕiz.nʊ svɐ.ˈju pa.vʲɪ.ˈdʲɵm]

[prʲɪ.ˈpʲɛf] 3
[ˈsɫaf⁽ʲ⁾.sʲa a.ˈtʲɛ.tɕɪst.va ˈna.ʂɛ sva.ˈbod.na.jɛ]
[ˈsɫa.vɨ nɐ.ˈro.dɐf nɐ.ˈdʲɵʐ.nɨj ɐ.ˈpɫot]
[ˈzna.mʲa sa.ˈvʲɛt.ska.jɛ ˈzna.mʲa na.ˈrod.na.jɛ]
[pusʲtʲ at pɐ.ˈbʲɛ.dɨ k‿pɐ.ˈbʲɛ.dʲɛ vʲɪ.ˈdʲɵt]

=== Post-Stalin version ===
c. 1977 official orchestral and choral vocal recording
Performed by the Alexandrov Ensemble (First verse only)

Russian original

I
Союз нерушимый республик свободных
Сплотила навеки Великая Русь.
Да здравствует созданный волей народов
Единый, могучий Советский Союз!

Припев:
Славься, Отечество наше свободное,
Дружбы народов надёжный оплот!
Партия Ленина — сила народная
Нас к торжеству коммунизма ведёт!

II
Сквозь грозы сияло нам солнце свободы,
И Ленин великий нам путь озарил:
На правое дело он поднял народы,
На труд и на подвиги нас вдохновил!

Припев

III
В победе бессмертных идей коммунизма
Мы видим грядущее нашей страны,
И Красному знамени славной Отчизны
Мы будем всегда беззаветно верны!

Припев

Romanization

I
Sojúz nerushímyj respúblik svobódnykh
Splotíla navéki velíkaja Rus'.
Da zdrávstvujet sózdannyj vólej naródov
Jedínyj, mogúchij Sovétskij Sojúz!

Pripév:
Sláv'sya, Otéchestvo náshe svobódnoye,
Drúzhby naródov nadjózhnyj oplót!
Pártija Lénina — síla naródnaja
Nas k torzhestvú kommunízma vedjót!

II
Skvoz' grózy siyalo nam sólnce svobódy,
I Lénin velíkij nam put' ozaríl,
Na právoye délo on pódnyal naródy,
Na trud i na pódvigi nas vdokhnovíl!

Pripév

III
V pobéde bessmértnykh idéy kommunízma
My vídim grjadúshcheje náshej straný,
I Krásnomu známeni slávnoj Otchízny
My búdem vsegdá bezzavétno verný!

Pripév

IPA transcription as sung (Note: See File:Gimn Sovetskogo Soyuza (1977 Vocal-Red Army Choir version).oga, Help:IPA/Russian and Russian phonology.)

1
[sɐ.ˈjuz‿nʲɛ.rʊ.ˈʂɨ.mɨj rʲɪs.ˈpu.blʲɪk svɐ.ˈbod.nɨx]
[spɫɐ.ˈtʲi.ɫa nɐ.ˈvʲɛ.kʲi vʲɛ.ˈlʲi.ka.ja rusʲ]
[dɐ‿ˈzdrast.vʊ.jɪt ˈsoz.dan.nɨj ˈvo.lʲej nɐ.ˈro.dɐf]
[jɛ.ˈdʲi.nɨj mɐ.ˈɡu.tɕɪj sɐ.ˈvʲɛt.skʲɪj sɐ.ˈjus]

[prʲɪ.ˈpʲɛf]:
[ˈsɫaf⁽ʲ⁾.sʲa a.ˈtʲɛ.tɕɪst.va ˈna.ʂɛ sva.ˈbod.na.jɛ]
[ˈdruʐ.bɨ nɐ.ˈro.dɐf nɐ.ˈdʲɵʐ.nɨj ɐ.ˈpɫot]
[ˈpar.tʲi.jɐ ˈlʲɛ.nʲi.na ˈsʲi.ɫa nɐ.ˈrod.na.ja]
[nas k‿tɐr.ʐɨst.ˈvu ka.mʊ.ˈnʲiz.ma vʲɪ.ˈdʲɵt]

2
[skvɐzʲ‿ˈɡro.zɨ sʲɪ.ˈja.ɫa nam ˈson.tsɛ svɐ.ˈbo.dɨ]
[i ˈlʲɛ.nʲin vʲɛ.ˈlʲi.kʲɪj nam putʲ ɐ.zɐ.ˈrʲiɫ]
[nɐ‿ˈpra.va.jɪ ˈdʲɛ.ɫa on ˈpodʲ.nʲaɫ nɐ.ˈro.dɨ]
[nɐ‿trud i nɐ‿ˈpod.vʲɪ.ɡʲɪ naz‿vdɐx.nɐ.ˈvʲiɫ]

[prʲɪ.ˈpʲɛf]

3
[f‿pɐ.ˈbʲɛ.dʲɛ bʲɪs.ˈsmʲɛrt.nɨx ɪ.ˈdʲɛj ka.mʊ.ˈnʲiz.ma]
[mɨ ˈvʲi.dʲɪm ɡrʲɪ(ɐ).ˈduɕ.ɕɛ.jɪ ˈna.ʂɛj strɐ.ˈnɨ]
[i ˈkras.na.mʊ ˈzna.mʲɛ.nʲɪ ˈsɫav.naj ɐt.ˈtɕiz.nɨ]
[mɨ ˈbu.dʲɪm fsʲɪɡ.ˈda bʲɛz.zɐ.ˈvʲɛt.na vʲɪr.ˈnɨ]

[prʲɪ.ˈpʲɛf]

=== English translations ===
Literal translation of the original version

I
An unbreakable union of free republics,
The Great Rus' has sealed forever.
Long live, the creation by the people's will,
The united, mighty Soviet Union!

Chorus I:
Be glorified, our free motherland,
Reliable stronghold of the people's friendship!
Banner of the Soviets, the banner of the people,
May it lead from victory to victory!

II
Through storms, the sun of freedom shone on us,
And Great Lenin illuminated our path.
Stalin taught us to be faithful to the people,
To labor and achievements, we were inspired!

Chorus II:
Be glorified, our free motherland,
Reliable stronghold of the people's happiness!
Banner of the Soviets, the banner of the people,
May it lead from victory to victory!

III
We raised our Army in battles,
And swept the vile invaders from the path!
In battles, we determine the fate of generations,
We bring glory to our Motherland!

Chorus III:
Be glorified, our free motherland,
Reliable stronghold of the people's glory!
Banner of the Soviets, the banner of the people,
May it lead from victory to victory!

Literal translation of the post-Stalin version

I
An unbreakable union of free republics,
The Great Rus' has sealed forever.
Long live, the creation by the people's will,
The united, mighty Soviet Union!

Chorus:
Be glorified, our free Motherland,
Reliable stronghold of the people's friendship!
The Party of Lenin – the strength of the people,
Leads us to the triumph of Communism!

II
Through storms, the sun of freedom shined on us,
And Great Lenin illuminated our path!
To a righteous cause, he raised the people
To labor and achievements, we were inspired!

Chorus

III
In the victory of Communism's immortal ideas,
We see the future of our country!
And to the red banner of the glorious Motherland,
We will always be devotedly true!

Chorus

=== English adaptations ===
Official CPSU translation (1944 lyrics)

I
Unbreakable Union of freeborn Republics
Great Russia has welded forever to stand;
Created in struggle by will of the peoples,
United and mighty, our Soviet land!

Chorus:
Sing to our Motherland, glory undying,
Bulwark of peoples in brotherhood strong!
Flag of the Soviets, peoples' flag flying,
Lead us from victory to victory on!

II
Through tempests, the sunrays of freedom have cheered us,
Along the new path where great Lenin did lead,
Be true to the people, thus Stalin has reared us,
Inspired us to labour and valorous deed!

Chorus

III
Our army grew up in the heat of grim battle,
Barbarian invaders, we'll swiftly strike down.
In combat the fate of the future we'll settle,
Our country we'll lead to eternal renown!

Chorus

Paul Robeson's adaptation (1949)

I
United forever in friendship and labor,
Our mighty republics will ever endure.
The Great Soviet Union will live through the ages.
The dream of a people, their fortress secure!

Chorus:
Long live our Soviet motherland, Built by the people's mighty hand.
Long live our people, united and free!
Strong in our Friendship tried by fire, long may our crimson flag inspire,
Shining in glory for all men to see!

II
Through days dark and stormy while Great Lenin led us,
Our eyes saw the bright sun of freedom above,
And Stalin, our leader, with faith in the people,
Inspired us to build up the land that we love!

Chorus

III
We fought for the future, destroyed the invader,
And brought to our Homeland the Laurels of Fame.
Our glory will live in the memory of nations,
and all generations will honor her name!

Chorus

Olga Paul version (1944)

I
The Russian [Soviet] republics, in freedom united,
Have mustered their power, their glory, their pride,
And thus they created the great Soviet Union,
The will of the nations that spread far and wide!

Chorus:
Great shall your glory be, motherland proud and free,
Bulwark of friendship for nation and man!
Flag of the Soviets, lead us to victory,
Flag of the people since freedom began!

II
The sunlight of freedom has shone through the tempest,
And Lenin has lighted our path with his flame,
While Stalin has shown us that faith in the people
Inspires us to action, to deeds, and to fame.

Chorus

III
Our army in action has grown in its power,
And soon it will wipe out the enemy horde;
The fate of the future is sealed by our bravery,
For honor and glory shall be our reward!

Chorus

== See also ==
- Alexandrov Ensemble
- Anthems of the Soviet Republics
- Auferstanden aus Ruinen
- Communist symbolism
- List of socialist songs
- March of the Volunteers
- National anthem of Russia
- The Internationale
- White Army, Black Baron
- Worker's Marseillaise
- Workers of the world, unite!
