= National anthem of Russia =

Gosudarstvennyy gimn Rossiyskoy Federatsii
English: State Anthem of the Russian Federation
- Государственный гимн Российской Федерации
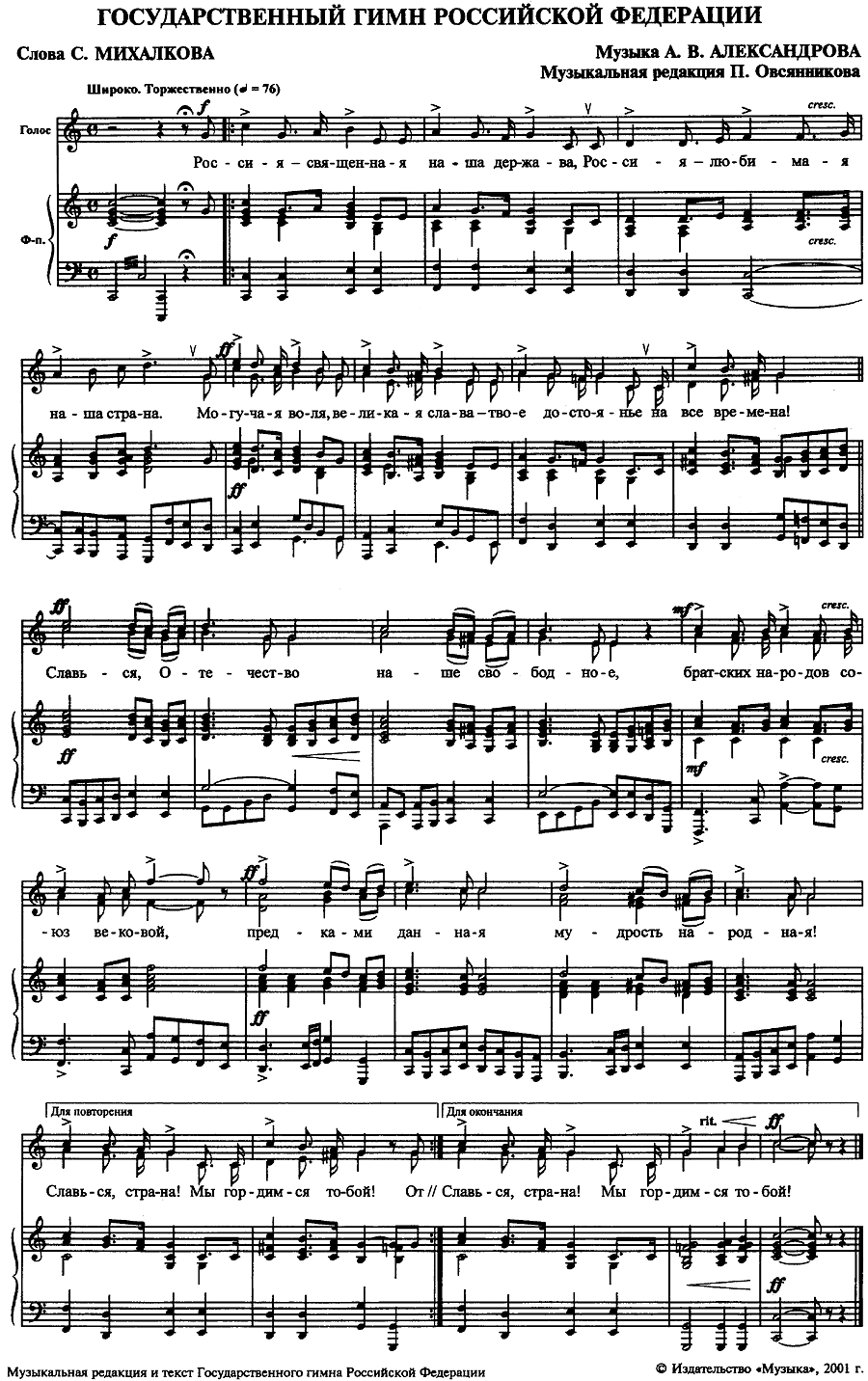
- The official arrangement of the Russian national anthem, completed in 2001
- National anthem of Russia
- Lyrics: Sergei Mikhalkov, 2000
- Music: Alexander Alexandrov, 1939
- Adopted: 25 December 2000 (music); 30 December 2000 (lyrics)
- Preceded by: "The Patriotic Song"

Audio sample
- Official orchestral vocal recording by the Russian Presidential Orchestra and the Moscow Kremlin Choir in C major: file; help

Official orchestral instrumental recording
Performed by the Russian Presidential Orchestra

Official orchestral instrumental recording (one verse)
Performed by the Russian Presidential Orchestra

Band instrumental version (one verse)
Performed by the United States Navy Band

The State Anthem of the Russian Federation (Note: Russian: Государственный гимн Российской Федерации, romanized: Gosudarstvennyy gimn Rossiyskoy Federatsii, IPA: [ɡəsʊˈdarstvʲɪn(ː)ɨj ˈɡʲimn rɐˈsʲijskəj fʲɪdʲɪˈratsɨɪ]) is the national anthem of Russia. It uses the same melody as the State Anthem of the Soviet Union, composed by Alexander Alexandrov, and new lyrics by Sergey Mikhalkov, who had collaborated with Gabriel El-Registan on the original anthem. From 1944, that earliest version replaced "The Internationale" as a new, more Soviet- and Russia-centric Soviet anthem. The same melody, but without lyrics, was used after 1956. A second version of the lyrics was written by Mikhalkov in 1970 and adopted in 1977, placing less emphasis on World War II and more on the victory of communism, and without mentioning Joseph Stalin by name.

The Russian SFSR was the only constituent republic of the Soviet Union without its own regional anthem, instead using the State Anthem of the Soviet Union. The lyric-free "Patriotic Song", composed by Mikhail Glinka, was officially adopted in 1990 by the Supreme Soviet of Russia, and confirmed in 1993, after the dissolution of the Soviet Union, by President Boris Yeltsin. This anthem proved to be unpopular with the Russian public and with many politicians and public figures, because of its tune and lack of lyrics, and consequently its inability to inspire Russian athletes during international competitions. The government sponsored contests to create lyrics for the unpopular anthem, but none of the entries were adopted.

Glinka's anthem was replaced soon after Yeltsin's successor, Vladimir Putin, first took office on 7 May 2000. The federal legislature established and approved the music of the national anthem of the Soviet Union, with newly written lyrics, in December 2000, and it became the second anthem used by Russia after the dissolution of the Soviet Union. The government sponsored a contest to find lyrics, eventually settling upon a new composition by Mikhalkov; according to the government, the lyrics were selected to evoke and eulogize the history and traditions of Russia. Yeltsin criticized Putin for supporting the reintroduction of the Soviet-era national anthem even though opinion polls showed that many Russians favored this decision.

Public perception of the anthem is positive among Russians. A 2009 poll showed that 56% of respondents felt proud when hearing the national anthem, and that 25% liked it.

== Historical anthems ==
Before "The Prayer of the Russians" (Молитва русских) was chosen as the national anthem of Imperial Russia in 1816, various church hymns and military marches were used to honor the country and the Tsars. Songs used include "Let the Thunder of Victory Rumble!" (Гром победы, раздавайся!) and "How Glorious is our Lord" (Коль славен). "The Prayer of the Russians" was adopted around 1816, and used lyrics by Vasily Zhukovsky set to the music of the British anthem, "God Save the King". Russia's anthem was also influenced by the anthems of France and the Netherlands, and by the British patriotic song "Rule, Britannia!".

In 1833, Zhukovsky was asked to set lyrics to a musical composition by Prince Alexei Lvov called "The Russian People's Prayer", known more commonly as "God Save the Tsar!" (Боже, Царя храни!). It was well received by Nicholas I, who chose the song to be the next anthem of Imperial Russia. The song resembled a hymn, and its musical style was similar to that of other anthems used by European monarchs. "God Save the Tsar!" was performed for the first time on 8 December 1833, at the Bolshoi Theater in Moscow. It was later played at the Winter Palace on Christmas Day, by order of Nicholas I. Public singing of the anthem began at opera houses in 1834, but it was not widely known across the Russian Empire until 1837.

"God Save the Tsar!" was used until the February Revolution, when the Russian monarchy was overthrown. Upon the overthrow, in March 1917, the "Worker's Marseillaise" (Рабочая Марсельеза), Pyotr Lavrov's modification of the French anthem "La Marseillaise", was used as an unofficial anthem by the Russian Provisional Government. The modifications Lavrov made to "La Marseillaise" included a change in meter from 2/2 to 4/4 and music harmonization to make it sound more Russian. It was used at governmental meetings, welcoming ceremonies for diplomats and state funerals.

After the Bolsheviks overthrew the provisional government in the 1917 October Revolution, the anthem of international revolutionary socialism, "The Internationale", was adopted as the new anthem. The lyrics had been written by Eugène Pottier, and Pierre Degeyter had composed the music in 1871 to honor the creation of the Second Socialist International organization; in 1902, Arkady Kots translated Pottier's lyrics into Russian. Kots also changed the grammatical tense of the song, to make it more decisive in nature. The first major use of the song was at the funeral of victims of the February Revolution in Petrograd. Lenin also wanted "The Internationale" to be played more often because it was more socialist, and could not be confused with the French anthem; other persons in the new Soviet government believed "La Marseillaise" to be too bourgeois. "The Internationale" was used as the state anthem of Soviet Russia from 1918, adopted by the newly created Union of Soviet Socialist Republics in 1922, and was used until 1944.

== Post-1944 Soviet anthem ==
=== Music ===
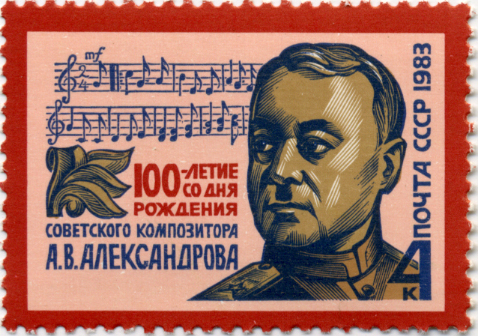
1983 Soviet stamp honoring the 100th anniversary of the birth of Alexander Alexandrov

The music of the national anthem, created by Alexander Vasilyevich Alexandrov, had previously been incorporated in several hymns and compositions. The music was first used in the Hymn of the Bolshevik Party, created in 1939. When the Comintern was dissolved in 1943, the government argued that "The Internationale", which was historically associated with the Comintern, should be replaced as the national anthem of the Soviet Union. Alexandrov's music was chosen as the new anthem by the Soviet leader Joseph Stalin after a contest in 1943. Stalin praised the song for fulfilling what a national anthem should be, though he criticized the song's orchestration.

In response, Alexandrov blamed the problems on Viktor Knushevitsky, who was responsible for orchestrating the entries for the final contest rounds. When writing the Bolshevik party anthem, Alexandrov incorporated pieces from the song "Life Has Become Better" (Жить Стало Лучше), a musical comedy that he composed. This comedy was based on a slogan Stalin first used in 1935. Over 200 entries were submitted for the anthem contest, including some by famous Soviet composers Dmitri Shostakovich, Aram Khachaturian and Iona Tuskiya. Later, the rejected joint entry by Khachaturian and Shostakovich became "Song of the Red Army", and Khachaturian went on to compose the Anthem of the Armenian SSR. There was also an entry from Boris Alexandrov, the son of Alexander. His rejected entry, "Long Live our State" (Да здравствует наша держава), became a popular patriotic song and was adopted as the State Anthem of Transnistria.

During the 2000 debate on the anthem, Boris Gryzlov, the leader of the Unity faction in the Duma, noted that the music which Alexandrov wrote for the Soviet anthem was similar to Vasily Kalinnikov's 1892 overture, "Bylina". Supporters of the Soviet anthem mentioned this in the various debates held in the Duma on the change of anthem, but there is no evidence that Alexandrov consciously used parts of "Bylina" in his composition.

=== Lyrics ===
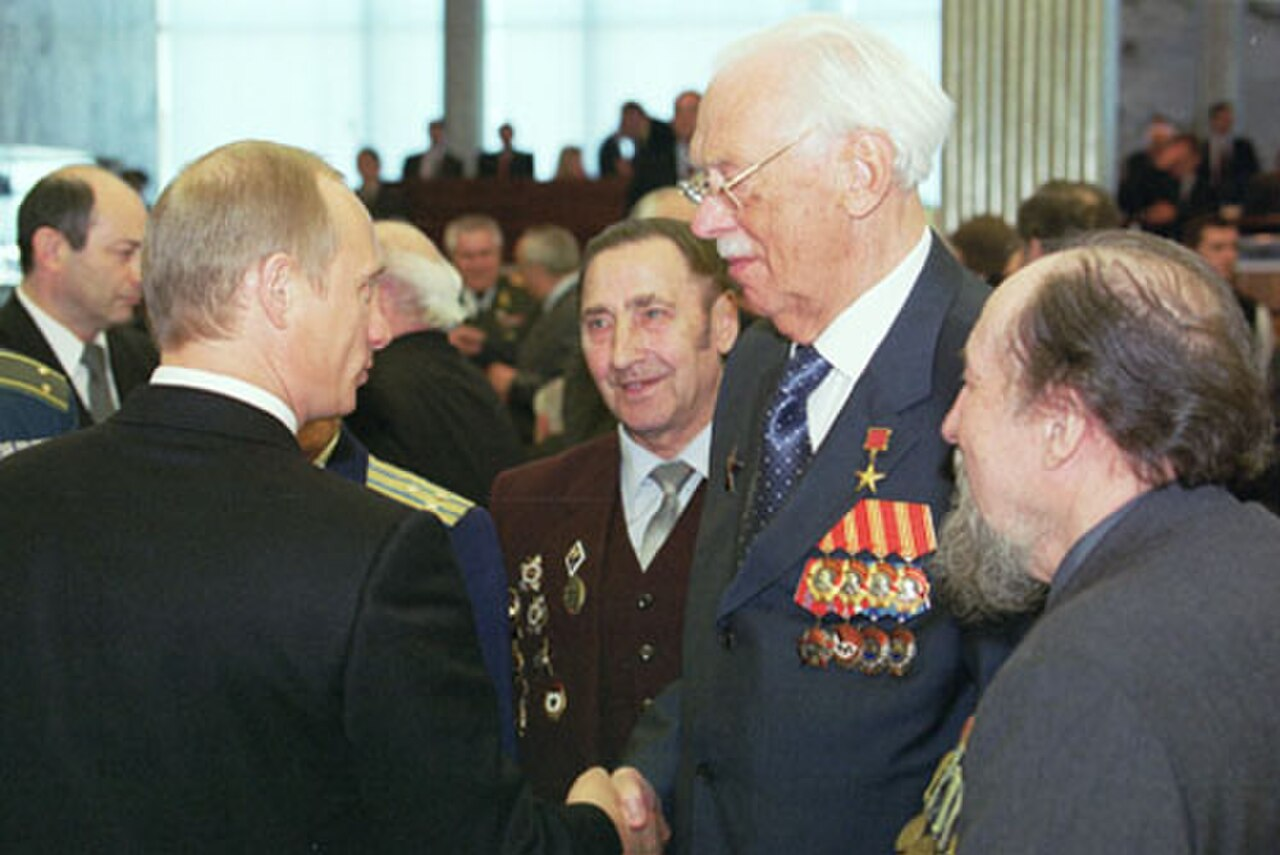
Lyric writer Sergey Mikhalkov in 2002 meeting President Putin

After selecting the music by Alexandrov for the national anthem, Stalin needed new lyrics. He thought that the song was short and, because of the Great Patriotic War, that it needed a statement about the impending defeat of Nazi Germany by the Red Army. The poets Sergey Mikhalkov and Gabriel El-Registan were called to Moscow by one of Stalin's staffers, and were told to fix the lyrics to Alexandrov's music. They were instructed to keep the verses the same, but to find a way to change the refrains which described "a Country of Soviets". Because of the difficulty of expressing the concepts of the Great Patriotic War in song, that idea was dropped from the version which El-Registan and Mikhalkov completed overnight. After a few minor changes to emphasize the Soviet Fatherland, Stalin approved the anthem and had it published on 7 November 1943, including a line about Stalin "inspir[ing] us to keep the faith with the people". The revised anthem was announced to all of the USSR on 1 January 1944, and became official on 15 March 1944.

After Stalin's death in 1953, the Soviet government examined his legacy. The government began the de-Stalinization process, which included downplaying the role of Stalin and moving his corpse from Lenin's Mausoleum to the Kremlin Wall Necropolis. In addition, the anthem lyrics composed by Mikhalkov and El-Registan were officially scrapped by the Soviet government in 1956. The anthem was still used by the Soviet government, but without any official lyrics. In private, this anthem became known the "Song Without Words". Mikhalkov wrote a new set of lyrics in 1970, but they were not submitted to the Presidium of the Supreme Soviet until 27 May 1977. The new lyrics, which eliminated any mention of Stalin, were approved on 1 September, and were made official with the printing of the new Soviet Constitution in October 1977. In the credits for the 1977 lyrics, Mikhalkov was mentioned, but references to El-Registan, who died in 1945, were dropped for unknown reasons.

== "The Patriotic Song" ==
Anthem of Russia
- (1990–2000)
- The Patriotic Song (1 min. 20 sec.) on YouTube

With the impending collapse of the Soviet Union in early 1990, a new national anthem was needed to help define the reorganized nation and to reject the Soviet past. The Chairman of the Supreme Soviet of the Russian SFSR, Boris Yeltsin, was advised to revive "God Save The Tsar" with modifications to the lyrics. However, he instead selected a piece composed by Mikhail Glinka. The piece, known as "The Patriotic Song" (Патриотическая песня), was a wordless piano composition discovered after Glinka's death. It was performed in front of the Supreme Soviet of the RSFSR on 23 November 1990. The song was decreed by the Supreme Soviet to be the new Russian anthem that same day. This anthem was intended to be permanent, which can be seen from the parliamentary draft of the Constitution, approved and drafted by Supreme Soviet, Congress of People's Deputies and its Constitutional Commission (with latter formally headed by the President of Russia). The draft, among other things, reads that:

The national anthem of the Russian Federation is the Patriotic Song composed by Mikhail Glinka. The text of the national anthem of the Russian Federation shall be endorsed by the federal law.

However, conflict between President and Congress made passage of that draft less likely: the Congress shifted onto more and more rewriting of the 1978 Russian Constitution, while President pushed forward with new draft Constitution, which does not define state symbols. After 1993 Russian constitutional crisis and just one day before the constitutional referendum (i.e. on 11 December 1993) Yeltsin, then President of Russia, issued a presidential decree on 11 December 1993, retaining "The Patriotic Song" the official anthem for Russia, but this decree was provisional, since the draft Constitution (which was passed a day later) explicitly referred this matter to legislation, enacted by parliament. According to Article 70 of the Constitution, state symbols required further definition by future legislation. As it was a constitutional matter, it had to be passed by a two-thirds majority in the Duma.

Between 1994 and 1999, many votes were called for in the State Duma to retain "The Patriotic Song" as the official anthem of Russia. However, it faced stiff opposition from members of the Communist Party of the Russian Federation, who wanted the Soviet anthem restored. Because any anthem had to be approved by a two-thirds supermajority, this disagreement between Duma factions for nearly a decade prevented passage of an anthem.

=== Call for lyrics ===
When "The Patriotic Song" was used as the national anthem, it had official lyrics but was not accepted. The anthem struck a positive chord for some people because it did not contain elements from the Soviet past, and because the public considered Glinka to be a patriot and a true Russian. However, the lack of lyrics doomed "The Patriotic Song". Various attempts were made to compose lyrics for the anthem, including a contest that allowed any Russian citizen to participate. A committee set up by the government looked at over 6000 entries, and 20 were recorded by an orchestra for a final vote.

The eventual winner was Viktor Radugin's "Be Glorious, Russia!" (Славься, Россия!). However, none of the lyrics were officially adopted by Yeltsin or the Russian government. One of the reasons that partially explained the lack of lyrics was the original use of Glinka's composition: the praise of the Tsar and of the Russian Orthodox Church. Other complaints raised about the song were that it was hard to remember, uninspiring, and musically complicated. It was one of the few national anthems that lacked official lyrics during this period. The only other wordless national anthems in the period from 1990 to 2000 were "My, biełarusy" of Belarus (until 2002), "Marcha Real" of Spain, and "Intermeco" of Bosnia and Herzegovina.

== Modern adoption ==
Performance of the Hymn of the Russian Federation by the Presidential Orchestra and Kremlin Choir at the inauguration of President Dmitry Medvedev at the Moscow Kremlin on 7 May 2008. Seen here is then-Prime Minister Vladimir Putin.

The anthem debate intensified in October 2000 when Yeltsin's successor, Vladimir Putin, commented that Russian athletes had no words to sing for the anthem during the gold medal ceremonies at the 2000 Summer Olympic Games. Putin brought public attention to the issue and put it before the State Council. CNN also reported that members of the Spartak Moscow football club complained that the wordless anthem "affected their morale and performance". Two years earlier, during the 1998 World Cup, members of the Russian team commented that the wordless anthem failed to inspire "great patriotic effort".

In a November session of the Federation Council, Putin stated that establishing the national symbols should be a top priority for the country. Putin pressed for the former Soviet anthem to be selected as the new Russian anthem, but strongly suggested that new lyrics be written. He did not say how much of the old Soviet lyrics should be retained for the new anthem. Putin submitted the bill "On the National Anthem of the Russian Federation" to the Duma for their consideration on 4 December. The Duma voted 381–51–1 in favor of adopting Alexandrov's music as the national anthem on 8 December 2000. Following the vote, a committee was formed and tasked with exploring lyrics for the national anthem. After receiving over 6,000 manuscripts from all sectors of Russian society, the committee selected lyrics by Mikhalkov for the anthem.

Before the official adoption of the lyrics, the Kremlin released a section of the anthem, which made a reference to the flag and coat of arms:

His mighty wings spread above us
The Russian eagle is hovering high
The Fatherland's tricolor symbol
Is leading Russia's peoples to victory

— Kremlin source

Instrumental performance of the Russian national anthem at the 2010 Moscow Victory Day Parade in Moscow's Red Square, resplendent with a 21-gun salute

The above lines were omitted from the final version of the lyrics. After the bill was approved by the Federation Council on 20 December, "On the National Anthem of the Russian Federation" was signed into law by President Putin on 25 December, officially making Alexandrov's music the national anthem of Russia. The law was published two days later in the official government gazette Rossiyskaya Gazeta. The new anthem was first performed on 30 December, during a ceremony at the Great Kremlin Palace in Moscow at which Mikhalkov's lyrics were officially made part of the national anthem.

Not everyone agreed with the adoption of the new anthem. Yeltsin reacted negatively upon listening to it for the first time, and described it as "reddish". He argued that the restoration of the Soviet anthem was part of a move to reject post-communist reforms that had taken place since Russian independence and the dissolution of the Soviet Union. Yeltsin also felt that Putin should not have changed the anthem merely to "follow blindly the mood of the people". This was one of his few public criticisms of Putin.

The liberal political party Yabloko stated that the re-adoption of the Soviet anthem "deepened the schism in Russian society," and led a failed movement to adopt "Farewell of Slavianka" (Прощание славянки) instead. The Soviet anthem was supported by the Communist Party and by Putin himself. The other national symbols used by Russia in 1990, the white-blue-red flag and the double-headed eagle coat of arms, were also given legal approval by Putin in December, thus ending the debate over the national symbols. After all of the symbols were adopted, Putin said on television that this move was needed to heal Russia's past and to fuse the period of the Soviet Union with Russia's history. He also stated that, while Russia's march towards democracy would not be stopped, the rejection of the Soviet era would have left the lives of their mothers and fathers bereft of meaning. It took some time for the Russian people to familiarize themselves with the anthem's lyrics; athletes were only able to hum along with the anthem during the medal ceremonies at the 2002 Winter Olympics.

== Public perception ==
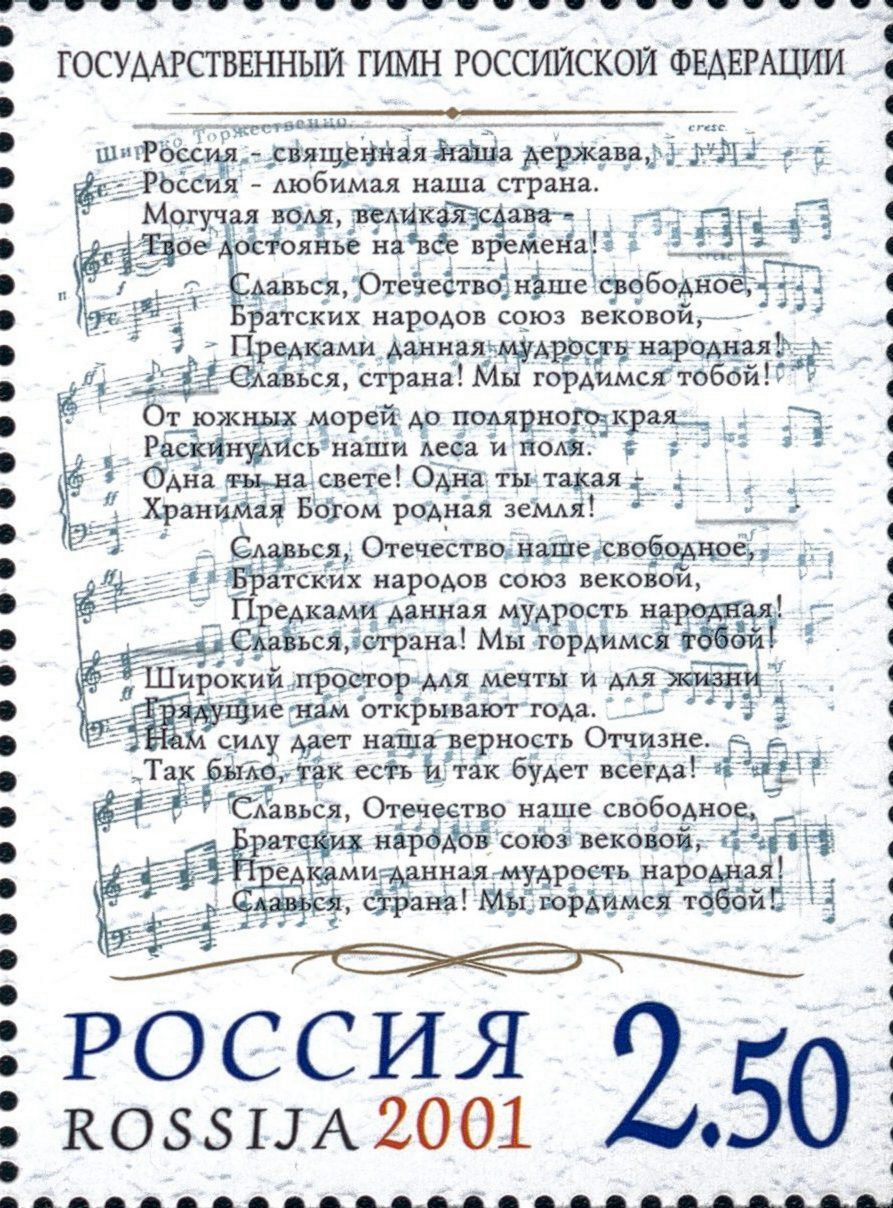
A 2001 stamp released by Russian Post with the lyrics of the new anthem

The Russian anthem is set to the melody of the State Anthem of the Union of Soviet Socialist Republics. As a result, there have been several controversies related to its use. Some such as cellist Mstislav Rostropovich vowed not to stand during the anthem. Russian cultural figures and government officials were also troubled by Putin's restoration of the Soviet anthem, even with different lyrics. A former adviser to both Yeltsin and Mikhail Gorbachev, the last President of the Soviet Union, stated that, when "Stalin's hymn" was used as the national anthem of the Soviet Union, horrific crimes took place.

At the 2007 funeral of Yeltsin, the Russian state anthem was played as his coffin was laid to rest at the Novodevichy Cemetery in Moscow. While it was common to hear the state anthem during state funerals for Soviet civil and military officials, honored citizens of the nation, and Soviet leaders, as was the case for Alexei Kosygin, Leonid Brezhnev, Yuri Andropov and Konstantin Chernenko, Boris Berezovsky, writing in The Daily Telegraph, felt that playing the anthem at Yeltsin's funeral "abused the man who brought freedom" to the Russian people. The Russian government states that the "solemn music and poetic work" of the anthem, despite its history, is a symbol of unity for the Russian people. Mikhalkov's words evoke "feelings of patriotism, respect for the history of the country and its system of government."

In a 2009 poll conducted by the Russian Public Opinion Research Center and publicized just two days before Russia's flag day (22 August), 56% of respondents stated that they felt proud when hearing the national anthem. However, only 39% could recall the words of the first line of the anthem. This was an increase from 33% in 2007. According to the survey, between 34 and 36% could not identify the anthem's first line. Overall, only 25% of respondents said they liked the anthem. In the previous year, the Russian Public Opinion Research Center found out that 56% of Russians felt pride and admiration at the anthem, even though only 40% (up from 19% in 2004) knew the first words of the anthem. It was also noted in the survey that the younger generation was the most familiar with the words.

In September 2009, a line from the lyrics used during Stalin's rule reappeared at the Moscow Metro station Kurskaya-Koltsevaya: "We were raised by Stalin to be true to the people, inspiring us to feats of labour and heroism." While groups have threatened legal action to reverse the re-addition of this phrase on a stone banner at the vestibule's rotunda, it was part of the original design of Kurskaya station and had been removed during de-Stalinization. Most of the commentary surrounding this event focused on the Kremlin's attempt to "rehabilitate the image" of Stalin by using symbolism sympathetic to or created by him.

The Communist Party of the Russian Federation strongly supported the restoration of Alexandrov's melody, but some members proposed other changes to the anthem. In March 2010, Boris Kashin, a KPRF member of the Duma, advocated for the removal of any reference to God in the anthem. Kashin's suggestion was also supported by Alexander Nikonov, a journalist with SPID-INFO and an avowed atheist. Nikonov argued that religion should be a private matter and should not be used by the state. Kashin found that the cost for making a new anthem recording will be about 120,000 rubles. The Russian Government quickly rejected the request because it lacked statistical data and other findings. Nikonov asked the Constitutional Court of Russia in 2005 if the lyrics were compatible with Russian law.

== Regulations ==
Federal law of 25 December 2000, on the national anthem of Russia

Regulations for the performance of the national anthem are set forth in the law signed by President Putin on 25 December 2000. While a performance of the anthem may include only music, only words, or a combination of both, the anthem must be performed using the official music and words prescribed by law. During official performances of the national anthem, everyone present listens to it standing, and men remove their hats. If the national anthem is played whilst the flag of Russia is being raised, the audience will face the flag.

Once a performance has been recorded, it may be used for any purpose, such as in a radio or television broadcast. The anthem may be played for solemn or celebratory occasions, such as the annual Victory Day parade in Moscow, or the funerals of heads of state and other significant figures. When asked about playing the anthem during the Victory Day parades, Defense Minister Anatoliy Serdyukov stated that because of the acoustics of the Red Square, only an orchestra would be used because voices would be swallowed by the echo.

The anthem is mandatory at the swearing-in of the President of Russia, for opening and closing sessions of the Duma and the Federation Council, and for official state ceremonies. It is played on television and radio at the beginning and end of the broadcast day. If programming is continuous, the anthem is played once at 0600 hours, or slightly earlier at 0458 hours. The anthem is also played on New Year's Eve after the New Year Address by the President. It is played at sporting events in Russia and abroad, according to the protocol of the organisation hosting the games. According to the law, when the anthem is played officially, everybody must stand up (in case the national flag is raising, facing to the flag), men must remove their headgear (in practice, excluding those in military uniform and clergymen). Uniformed personnel must give a military salute when the anthem plays.

The anthem is performed in 4/4 (common time) or in 2/4 in the key of C major, and has a tempo of 76 beats per minute. Using either time signature, the anthem must be played in a solemn (торжественно) and singing manner (распевно). The government has released arrangements for orchestras, brass bands and wind bands.

According to Russian copyright law, state symbols and signs are not protected by copyright. As such, the anthem's music and lyrics may be used and modified freely. Although the law calls for the anthem to be performed respectfully and for performers to avoid causing offence, it does not define what constitutes offensive acts or penalties. Standing for the anthem is required by law but the law does not specify a penalty for refusing to stand.

== Lyrics ==
Russian original (Cyrillic)

Россия — священная наша держава,
Россия — любимая наша страна.
Могучая воля, великая слава –
Твоё достоянье на все времена!

Припев:
Славься, Отечество наше свободное,
Братских народов союз вековой,
Предками данная мудрость народная!
Славься, страна! Мы гордимся тобой!

От южных морей до полярного края
Раскинулись наши леса и поля.
Одна ты на свете! Одна ты такая –
Хранимая Богом родная земля!

Припев

Широкий простор для мечты и для жизни
Грядущие нам открывают года.
Нам силу даёт наша верность Отчизне.
Так было, так есть и так будет всегда!

Припев

Romanization of Russian

Rossíya — svyashchénnaya násha derzháva,
Rossíya — lyubímaya násha straná.
Mogúchaya vólya, velíkaya sláva –
Tvoyó dostoyánye na vse vremená!

Pripév:
Slávsya, Otéchestvo náshe svobódnoye,
Brátskikh naródov soyúz vekovóy,
Prédkami dánnaya múdrost naródnaya!
Slávsya, straná! My gordímsya tobóy!

Ot yúzhnykh moréy do polyárnogo kráya
Raskínulis náshi lesá i polyá.
Odná ty na svéte! Odná ty takáya –
Khranímaya Bógom rodnáya zemlyá!

Pripév

Shirókiy prostór dlya mechtý i dlya zhízni
Gryadúshchiye nam otkryváyut godá.
Nam sílu dayót násha vérnost Otchízne.
Tak býlo, tak yest i tak búdet vsegdá!

Pripév

IPA transcription as sung (Note: See File:Russian Anthem chorus.ogg, Help:IPA/Russian and Russian phonology.)

[rɐˈsʲi.jɐ | svʲɪˈɕːɛ.nːɐ.jɐ ˈna.ʂɐ dʲɪrˈʐa.vɐ |]
[rɐˈsʲi.jɐ | lʲʉˈbʲi.mɐ.jɐ ˈna.ʂɐ strɐˈna ‖]
[mɐˈɡu.tɕɐ.jɐ ˈvo.lʲa | vʲɛˈlʲi.kɐ.jɐ ˈsɫa.vɐ |]
[tvɐˈjɵ dɐ.stɐˈjanʲ.jɛ nɐ‿fsʲɛ vrʲɛ.mʲɪˈna ‖]

[prʲɪˈpʲɛf]:
[ˈsɫafʲ.sʲɐ | ɐˈtʲɛ.tɕɪ.stvɐ ˈna.ʂɛ svɐˈbod.nɐ.jɛ |]
[ˈbrat.skʲix nɐˈro.dɐf sɐˈjuz‿vʲɛ.kɐˈvoj |]
[ˈprʲɛt.kɐ.mʲi ˈda.nːɐ.jɐ ˈmu.drɐsʲtʲ nɐˈrod.nɐ.jɐ ‖]
[ˈsɫafʲ.sʲɐ | strɐˈna ‖ mɨ ɡɐrˈdʲim.sʲɐ tɐˈboj ‖]

[ɐt‿ˈjuʐ.nɨx mɐˈrʲɛj dɐ‿pɐˈlʲar.nɐ.vɐ ˈkra.jɐ]
[rɐˈskʲi.nu.lʲɪsʲ ˈna.ʂɨ lʲɪˈsa i pɐˈlʲa ‖]
[ɐdˈna tɨ nɐ‿ˈsvʲɛ.tʲɛ ‖ ɐdˈna tɨ tɐˈka.jɐ |]
[xrɐˈnʲi.mɐ.jɐ ˈbo.ɡɐm rɐdˈna.jɐ zʲɪmˈlʲa ‖]

[prʲɪˈpʲɛf]

[ʂɨˈro.kʲij prɐˈstor dlʲɐ‿mʲɪtɕˈtɨ i dlʲɐ‿ˈʐɨzʲ.nʲɪ ‖]
[ɡrʲɪ(ɐ)ˈdu.ɕːi.jɪ ˈnam ɐt.krɨˈva.jud‿ɡɐˈda ‖]
[nɐm‿ˈsʲi.ɫu dɐˈjɵt ˈna.ʂɐ ˈvʲɛr.nɐsʲtʲ ɐtˈtɕizʲ.nʲɪ ‖]
[tɐɡ‿ˈbɨ.ɫɐ | tɐk ˈjɛsʲtʲ i tɐɡ‿ˈbu.dʲɛt fsʲɪɡˈda ‖]

[prʲɪˈpʲɛf]

English translation

Russia is our sacred state,
Russia is our beloved country.
A mighty will, great glory –
Your dignity for all time!

Chorus:
Be glorified, our free Fatherland,
The age-old union of fraternal peoples,
Ancestor-given wisdom of the people!
Be glorified, country! We are proud of you!

From the southern seas to the polar edge
Our forests and fields are spread out.
You are the only one in the world! You are the only one –
the native land so kept by God!

Chorus

A wide scope for dreams and for life
The coming years open to us.
We are given strength by our fidelity to the Fatherland.
So it was, so it is and it will always be so!

Chorus
