= Demographics of Zimbabwe =

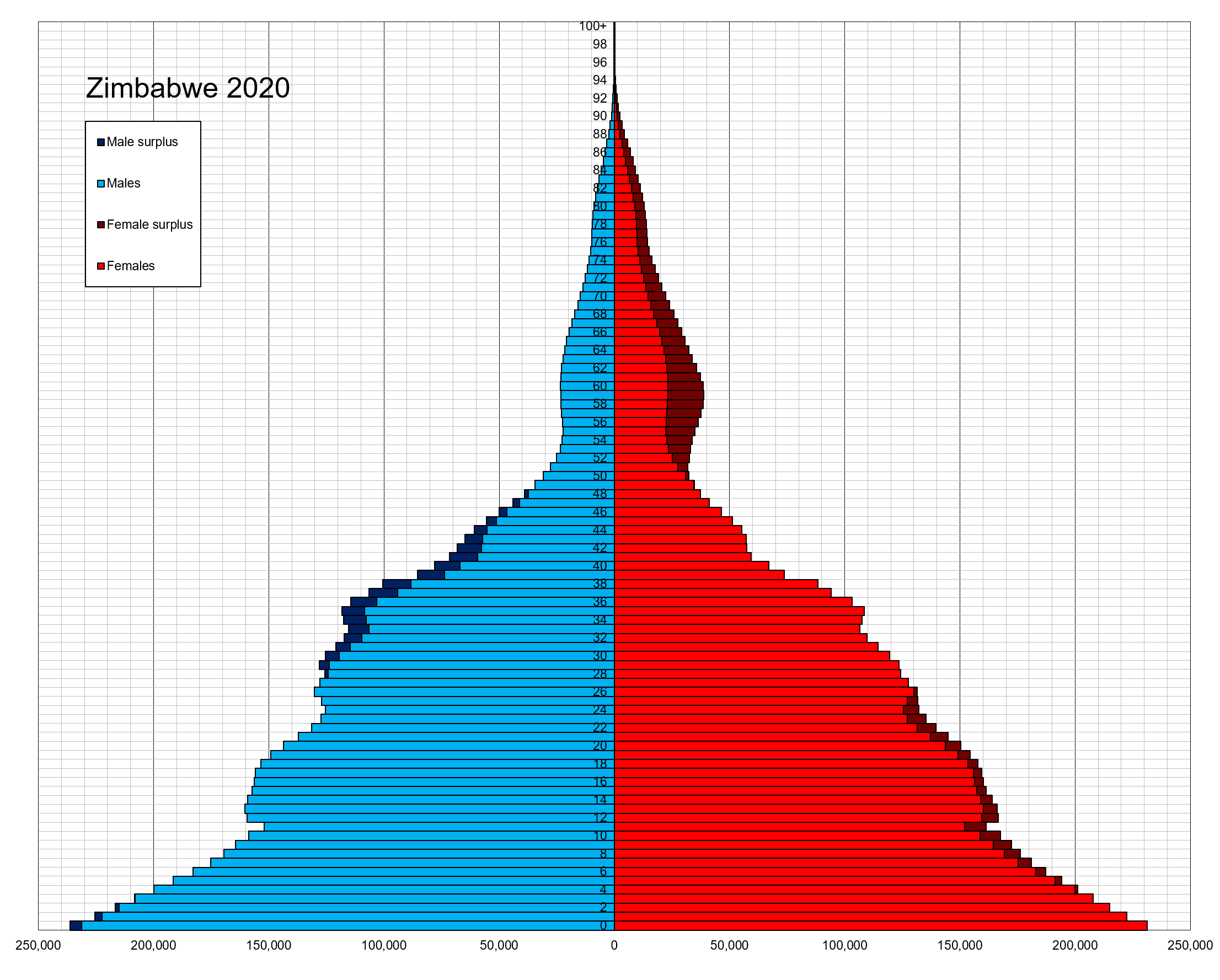
- Population pyramid of Zimbabwe in 2020
- Population: 15,121,004 (2022 est.)
- Growth rate: 1.95% (2022 est.)
- Birth rate: 29.5 births/1,000 population (2025 est.)
- Death rate: 7.4 deaths/1,000 population (2025 est.)
- Life expectancy: 63.32 years
  - male: 61.18 years
  - female: 65.52 years
- Fertility rate: 3.62 children born/woman (2025 est.)
- Infant mortality: 28.53 deaths/1,000 live births
- Net migration rate: –4.83 migrant(s)/1,000 population

Sex ratio
- Total: 0.97 male(s)/female (2022 est.)
- At birth: 1.03 male(s)/female

Nationality
- Nationality: Zimbabwean
- Major ethnic: African – 99.4%

Language
- Official: Shona, Ndebele, English and 56 other minority languages

Historical population of Zimbabwe

Demographic features of the population of Zimbabwe include population density, ethnicity, education level, health of the populace, economic status, religious affiliations and other aspects of the population.

== Population ==
The population of Zimbabwe has grown during the 20th century. This is in accordance with the model of a developing country with high birth rates and falling death rates, resulting in relatively high population growth rate (around 3% or above in the 1960s and early 1970s). After a spurt in the period 1980–1983 following independence, a decline in birth rates set in. Since 1991, however, there has been a jump in death rates from a low of 10 per 1000 in 1985 to a high of 25 per 1000 in 2002/2003. It has since subsided to just under 22 per 1000 (estimate for 2007) a little below the birth rate of around 27 per 1000.

ZimStat released the 2022 Population and Housing Census Preliminary Results which showed that Zimbabwe's population had increased by 16.2% and stood at 15.1 million people as of 20 April 2022.

View chart definition.
View chart definition.
View chart definition.
View chart definition.

=== Census data ===
Historical population
Year	Pop.	±%
1982	7,608,432	—
1992	10,412,548	+36.9%
2002	11,631,657	+11.7%
2012	13,061,239	+12.3%
2022	15,178,957	+16.2%

==== Historical data of Southern Rhodesia ====
Census
Year	Black	White	Coloured	Asian
1911	744,558	23,606	2,912	
1921	862,319	33,620	1,998	1,250

Estimates
Year	Black	White
1890	700,000	
1910	900,000	20,000
1927	922,000	38,200
1930	1,300,000	
1945	1,400,000?	140,000
1946	1,640,000	80,500

=== Current estimates ===
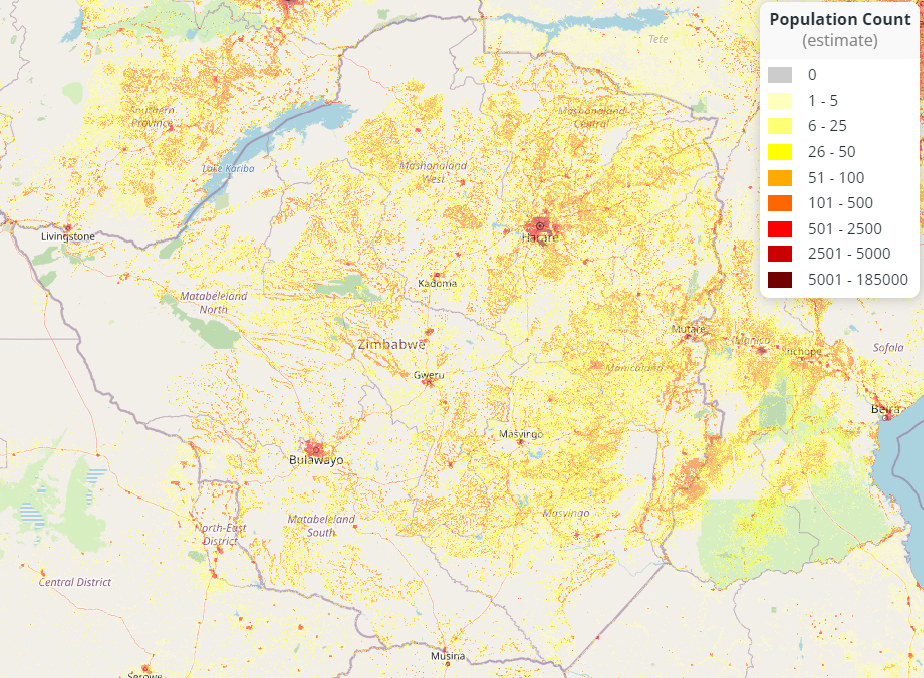
Population density (2022)

Based on the 2022 revision of the World Population Prospects, the population of Zimbabwe was estimated by the United Nations at 15,993,524 in 2021. About 38.9% comprised youths under 15, while another 56.9% grouped persons aged between 15 and 65 years. Only around 4.2% of citizens were apparently over 65.

	Total population	Population aged 0–14 (%)	Population aged 15–64 (%)	Population aged 65+ (%)
1950	2 747 000	42.0	54.8	3.2
1955	3 204 000	43.8	52.9	3.3
1960	3 752 000	45.3	51.4	3.4
1965	4 422 000	47.7	49.0	3.3
1970	5 206 000	48.1	48.7	3.2
1975	6 170 000	48.4	48.5	3.1
1980	7 289 000	48.9	48.1	3.0
1985	8 855 000	47.9	49.1	3.0
1990	10 469 000	46.1	50.9	3.0
1995	11 685 000	44.3	52.5	3.2
2000	12 509 000	41.7	54.9	3.4
2005	12 710 000	40.1	56.1	3.8
2010	13 080 000	38.9	56.9	4.2

Population Estimates by Sex and Age Group (01.VII.2020):

Age group	Male	Female	Total	%
Total	7 287 922	7 891 035	15 178 957	100
0	220 711	221 948	442 659	2.9
1–4	815 889	817 766	1 633 655	10.7
5–9	1 032 460	1 037 226	2 069 686	13.6
10–14	992 173	994 369	1 986 542	13.1
15–19	603 279	791 914	1 573 123	10.4
20–24	603 279	676 121	1 279 400	8.4
25–29	478 758	559 313	1 038 071	6.8
30–34	434 810	510 887	945 697	6.2
35–39	463 676	533 369	997 045	6.6
40–44	385 120	410 155	795 275	5.2
45–49	328 502	332 942	661 444	4.4
50–54	224 187	226 417	450 604	3.0
55–59	128 893	180 111	309 004	2.0
60–64	117 633	177 522	295 155	1.9
65–69	103 166	151 151	254 317	1.7
70–74	67 666	103 527	171 193	1.1
75–79	44 665	65 358	110 023	0.7
80–84	31 067	45 038	76 105	0.5
85–89	17 048	26 442	43 490	0.3
90–94	8 620	15 692	24 312	0.16
95–99	2 454	5 311	7 765	0.05
100+	1 523	3 754	5 277	0.03
Age group	Male	Female	Total	Percent
0–14	2 837 556	2 918 635	6 132 546	40.4
15–64	4 361 627	4 778 499	8 344 818	54.97
65+	240 038	337 468	692 482	4.56

== Vital statistics ==
=== United Nations estimates ===
Registration of vital events in Zimbabwe is not complete. The Population Department of the United Nations prepared the following estimates.

Period	Mid-year Population	Live births	Deaths	Natural change	CBR*	CDR*	NC*	TFR*	IMR*	Life expectancy (in years)
1950	2 791 000	141 000	46 000	95 000	50.4	16.6	33.8	7.10	102.2	49.64
1951	2 882 000	144 000	48 000	96 000	49.9	16.7	33.2	7.10	101.4	49.86
1952	2 974 000	147 000	49 000	98 000	49.5	16.5	33.1	7.11	99.8	50.22
1953	3 068 000	151 000	50 000	101 000	49.1	16.2	32.9	7.12	98.1	50.62
1954	3 165 000	155 000	50 000	104 000	48.8	15.9	32.8	7.13	96.4	51.01
1955	3 264 000	158 000	51 000	107 000	48.4	15.7	32.7	7.14	95.0	51.28
1956	3 365 000	162 000	52 000	110 000	48.1	15.4	32.7	7.16	93.6	51.70
1957	3 470 000	166 000	53 000	114 000	47.9	15.1	32.8	7.17	92.2	52.06
1958	3 579 000	171 000	53 000	118 000	47.7	14.8	32.8	7.19	90.6	52.40
1959	3 691 000	175 000	54 000	122 000	47.4	14.5	32.9	7.20	88.8	52.84
1960	3 806 000	180 000	54 000	126 000	47.3	14.2	33.0	7.22	87.1	53.24
1961	3 926 000	185 000	55 000	130 000	47.0	13.9	33.1	7.23	85.3	53.62
1962	4 050 000	190 000	55 000	135 000	46.9	13.6	33.3	7.26	83.3	54.07
1963	4 178 000	195 000	55 000	140 000	46.6	13.2	33.4	7.25	81.3	54.55
1964	4 310 000	200 000	56 000	145 000	46.4	12.9	33.5	7.26	79.2	54.99
1965	4 447 000	206 000	56 000	150 000	46.2	12.6	33.7	7.26	77.1	55.46
1966	4 589 000	212 000	56 000	155 000	46.1	12.3	33.8	7.24	75.2	55.89
1967	4 735 000	218 000	57 000	161 000	45.9	12.0	33.9	7.22	73.5	56.19
1968	4 886 000	225 000	58 000	167 000	45.9	11.8	34.1	7.19	72.1	56.46
1969	5 044 000	232 000	59 000	174 000	46.0	11.6	34.3	7.14	71.0	56.71
1970	5 203 000	240 000	60 000	181 000	46.1	11.4	34.6	7.09	70.1	57.03
1971	5 363 000	248 000	61 000	187 000	46.2	11.4	34.8	7.06	69.6	57.20
1972	5 533 000	258 000	63 000	195 000	46.5	11.3	35.2	7.06	69.3	57.40
1973	5 713 000	269 000	65 000	204 000	47.0	11.3	35.7	7.07	69.1	57.37
1974	5 904 000	279 000	67 000	212 000	47.2	11.3	35.9	7.04	69.0	57.49
1975	6 097 000	289 000	69 000	220 000	47.3	11.3	36.0	6.98	69.2	57.55
1976	6 288 000	297 000	73 000	224 000	47.1	11.6	35.6	6.91	69.3	56.94
1977	6 453 000	304 000	77 000	227 000	46.7	11.8	34.9	6.85	69.3	56.29
1978	6 549 000	309 000	84 000	226 000	46.6	12.6	34.0	6.77	69.0	54.59
1979	6 656 000	310 000	84 000	226 000	46.3	12.6	33.8	6.70	68.5	55.04
1980	7 050 000	317 000	76 000	241 000	46.2	11.1	35.1	6.61	66.9	58.67
1981	7 507 000	349 000	76 000	273 000	46.5	10.1	36.4	6.51	64.8	59.33
1982	7 804 000	358 000	76 000	282 000	45.9	9.8	36.1	6.38	62.0	59.88
1983	8 106 000	366 000	77 000	289 000	45.1	9.4	35.7	6.25	59.2	60.25
1984	8 399 000	365 000	75 000	290 000	43.4	8.9	34.5	6.08	55.7	61.05
1985	8 691 000	365 000	74 000	291 000	42.0	8.5	33.5	5.90	52.9	61.62
1986	8 983 000	364 000	73 000	290 000	40.5	8.2	32.3	5.70	50.8	62.02
1987	9 277 000	363 000	75 000	288 000	39.2	8.1	31.0	5.50	49.5	61.77
1988	9 569 000	356 000	78 000	278 000	37.2	8.2	29.0	5.29	49.2	61.32
1989	9 846 000	350 000	83 000	267 000	35.6	8.4	27.2	5.08	49.7	60.40
1990	10 114 000	352 000	88 000	263 000	34.8	8.7	26.0	4.87	50.9	59.43
1991	10 378 000	357 000	96 000	261 000	34.4	9.3	25.2	4.71	52.6	58.09
1992	10 642 000	363 000	106 000	257 000	34.1	9.9	24.2	4.57	54.8	56.44
1993	10 795 000	361 000	118 000	243 000	33.1	10.8	22.3	4.39	57.1	54.43
1994	10 859 000	359 000	128 000	230 000	32.8	11.8	21.1	4.27	58.9	52.59
1995	10 994 000	359 000	141 000	218 000	32.6	12.8	19.8	4.15	60.5	50.53
1996	11 178 000	372 000	154 000	218 000	33.2	13.8	19.4	4.11	61.8	48.96
1997	11 362 000	385 000	163 000	221 000	33.8	14.4	19.4	4.06	61.7	47.99
1998	11 548 000	399 000	175 000	224 000	34.5	15.2	19.4	4.03	61.4	46.82
1999	11 716 000	415 000	192 000	223 000	35.3	16.3	19.0	4.01	60.6	45.21
2000	11 835 000	424 000	200 000	224 000	35.6	16.8	18.8	3.97	59.9	44.69
2001	11 911 000	431 000	228 000	203 000	36.0	19.0	16.9	3.95	58.9	41.96
2002	11 985 000	433 000	204 000	229 000	35.9	17.0	19.0	3.89	58.3	44.57
2003	12 076 000	435 000	216 000	219 000	35.9	17.8	18.1	3.82	57.7	43.39
2004	12 161 000	434 000	208 000	226 000	35.5	17.0	18.5	3.74	58.1	44.50
2005	12 225 000	430 000	207 000	223 000	34.9	16.8	18.1	3.67	58.5	44.77
2006	12 330 000	427 000	203 000	223 000	34.5	16.4	18.1	3.62	59.5	45.36
2007	12 451 000	436 000	204 000	232 000	34.8	16.3	18.5	3.65	59.9	45.61
2008	12 550 000	449 000	197 000	252 000	35.6	15.6	20.0	3.77	59.9	46.72
2009	12 680 000	469 000	189 000	280 000	36.7	14.8	21.9	3.95	58.1	48.06
2010	12 840 000	478 000	171 000	307 000	37.1	13.3	23.8	4.03	55.0	50.65
2011	13 026 000	487 000	155 000	332 000	37.2	11.9	25.3	4.10	51.9	53.35
2012	13 265 000	490 000	142 000	347 000	36.8	10.7	26.1	4.10	47.2	55.63
2013	13 555 000	492 000	133 000	360 000	36.2	9.8	26.5	4.06	44.0	57.46
2014	13 856 000	488 000	127 000	361 000	35.1	9.1	26.0	3.96	42.0	58.85
2015	14 155 000	482 000	124 000	357 000	34.0	8.8	25.2	3.85	41.1	59.59
2016	14 453 000	480 000	122 000	358 000	33.2	8.4	24.7	3.77	39.6	60.31
2017	14 751 000	481 000	122 000	358 000	32.5	8.3	24.3	3.71	38.7	60.71
2018	15 052 000	484 000	120 000	364 000	32.1	8.0	24.1	3.66	37.4	61.41
2019	15 271 000	475 000	126 000	349 000	31.1	8.3	22.8	3.75	36.8	61.1
2020	15 527 000	481 000	126 000	355 000	31.0	8.1	22.9	3.75	35.7	61.5
2021	15 797 000	489 000	139 000	350 000	30.9	8.8	22.2	3.77	34.8	60.1
2022	16 069 000	496 000	125 000	371 000	30.9	7.8	23.1	3.77	34.1	62.4
2023	16 341 000	497 000	124 000	373 000	30.4	7.6	22.8	3.72	33.2	62.8
2024					29.9	7.5	22.4	3.67		
2025					29.5	7.4	22.1	3.62		
* CBR = crude birth rate (per 1000); CDR = crude death rate (per 1000); NC = natural change (per 1000); IMR = infant mortality rate per 1000 births; TFR = total fertility rate (number of children per woman)

=== Demographic and Health Surveys ===
Total Fertility Rate (TFR) (Wanted Fertility Rate) and Crude Birth Rate (CBR):

Year	CBR (Total)	TFR (Total)	CBR (Urban)	TFR (Urban)	CBR (Rural)	TFR (Rural)
1982–1984		6.66		5.33		7.28
1985–1988		5.31		3.86		6.06
1994	31.6	4.29 (3.5)	30.5	3.09 (2.6)	32.0	4.85 (3.9)
1999	30.8	3.96 (3.4)	31.3	2.96 (2.6)	30.5	4.57 (3.8)
2005–2006	31.0	3.8 (3.3)	28.5	2.6 (2.3)	32.0	4.6 (3.9)
2010–2011	34	4.1 (3.4)	34	3.1 (2.7)	34	4.8 (4.0)
2015	32.0	4.0 (3.6)	31.1	3.0 (2.7)	32.7	4.7 (4.1)
2023–24	28.9	3.9	28.4	3.1	29.4	4.6

Fertility data as of 2010–2011 (DHS Program):

Province	Total fertility rate	Percentage of women age 15–49 currently pregnant	Mean number of children ever born to women age 40–49
Manicaland	4.8	8.8	4.9
Mashonaland Central	4.5	9.1	5.0
Mashonaland East	4.5	7.3	4.2
Mashonaland West	4.5	8.5	5.0
Matabeleland North	4.1	7.7	5.2
Matabeleland South	4.2	6.6	4.6
Midlands	4.2	7.6	4.8
Masvingo	4.7	11.1	4.6
Harare	3.1	8.4	3.5
Bulawayo	2.8	4.8	3.2

=== Life expectancy at birth ===
Life expectancy from 1950 to 2021 (UN World Population Prospects):

Life expectancy in Zimbabwe

Period	Life expectancy in Years
1950–1955	48.54
1955–1960	▲50.59
1960–1965	▲52.48
1965–1970	▲54.13
1970–1975	▲55.78
1975–1980	▲57.84
1980–1985	▲60.54
1985–1990	▼60.18
1990–1995	▼54.66
1995–2000	▼47.35
2000–2005	▼44.13
2005–2010	▲48.35
2010–2015	▲57.64
2020	▲61.12
2021	▼59.25

== Ethnic groups ==
According to 2012 Census report, 99.6% of the population is of African origin. Of the rest of the population, the great bulk—perhaps 30,000 persons—are White Zimbabweans of European ancestry, a minority which had diminished in size prior to independence.

The vast black majority has grown at a projected annual rate of 4.3% since 1980. Although present figures are difficult to ascertain, the white community once reproduced itself at an annual rate (under 1.5%) similar to that of most totals in developed nations. Of the two major ethnolinguistic categories, Shona speakers formed a decisive plurality at (80<)% and occupied the eastern two-thirds of Zimbabwe. Ndebele speakers constitute about 16%, and none of the other indigenous ethnic groups came to as much as 2% in recent decades. African speakers of nonindigenous languages included migrant workers from Malawi, Zambia, and Mozambique.

Over 90% of White Zimbabweans are of British or British diasporan origin; at various times, many emigrated from South Africa and elsewhere. After World War II, Zimbabwe (then Southern Rhodesia) received a substantial influx of emigrants from the United Kingdom—a handful previously resided in other colonies such as India, Pakistan and Kenya. Also represented on a much smaller scale were individuals of Afrikaner, Greek, and Portuguese origin. After Rhodesia's Unilateral Declaration of Independence in 1965, Ian Smith's administration removed technical obstacles to immigration from southern Europe.

A heavily urbanised Coloured population is descended, partially, from early unions between White Rhodesian settlers and local Black African females. Many, however, can also trace their ancestry to the Dutch/Khoisan mulatto clans of the Cape.

With the exception of a select few who were brought to Zimbabwe as railroad workers, most Asians in Zimbabwe arrived from India pursuing employment or entrepreneurship. An educated class, they have traditionally engaged in retail trade or manufacturing.

== Languages ==
Zimbabwe has 16 official languages: Chewa, Chibarwe, English, Kalanga, Koisan, Nambya, Ndau, Ndebele, Shangani, Shona, sign language, Sotho, Tonga, Tswana, Venda, and Xhosa. English is widely used in administration, law and schools, though less than 2.5%, mainly the white and Coloured (mixed race) minorities, consider it their native language. The rest of the population speak Shona (70%) and Ndebele (20%), Kalanga (2%), etc. Shona has a rich oral tradition, which was incorporated into the first Shona novel, Feso by Solomon Mutswairo, published in 1956. English is spoken primarily in the cities, but less so in rural areas. Television news is broadcast in English, Shona and Ndebele though the local languages time slot falls out of prime viewing time, but radio broadcasts in English, Ndebele, Shona, Kalanga, Nambya, Venda, Suthu and Tonga. English, Ndebele and Shona are given far more airtime.

== Religion ==
Christians comprise 85% of the Zimbabwean population. Of that number, 61% regularly attend Christian churches. The largest Christian churches are Anglican, Roman Catholic, Seventh Day Adventist and Methodist. However, like most former European colonies, Christianity is often mixed with enduring traditional beliefs. Besides Christianity, ancestral worship (Amadlozi) is the most practised non-Christian religion which involves ancestor worship and spiritual intercession. Under 1% of the population is Muslim, although many Zimbabweans are influenced by Abrahamic food laws.

== See also ==
- Population and housing censuses by country
