= National Anthem of Zimbabwe =

National anthem of the Southern African country

Ngaikomborerwe Nyika yeZimbabwe
English: Blessed Be the Land of Zimbabwe
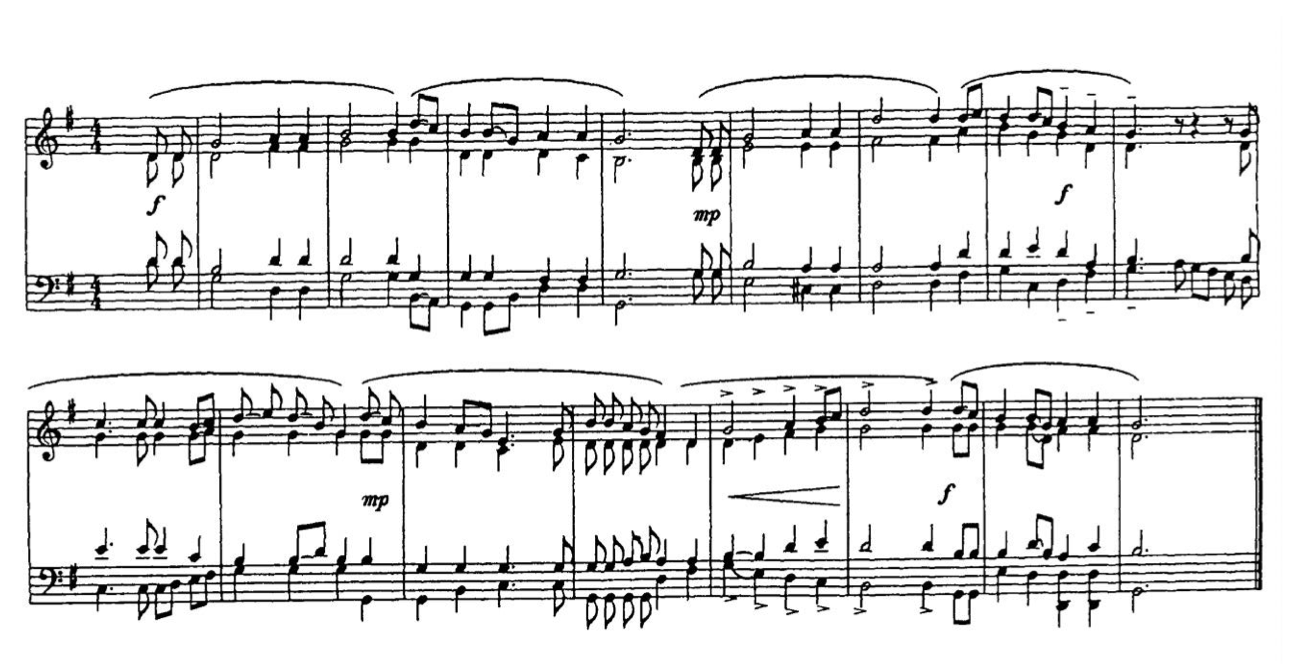
- Official sheet music, as printed in the Constitution of Zimbabwe
- National anthem of Zimbabwe
- Also known as: "Simudzai Mureza wedu WeZimbabwe" (English: "Proudly Lift High the Flag of the Land of Zimbabwe") "Kalibusiswe Ilizwe leZimbabwe" (English: "Blessed Be the Land of Zimbabwe")
- Lyrics: Solomon Mutswairo, 1993
- Music: Fred Changundega, 1993
- Adopted: March 1994
- Preceded by: "Ishe Komborera Africa"

Audio sample
- Instrumental version: file; help

The National Anthem of Zimbabwe, also known by its incipit in Shona, "Simudzai Mureza wedu WeZimbabwe" (English: "Proudly Lift High the Flag of the Land of Zimbabwe"), and the final line of each verse in Ndebele, "Kalibusiswe Ilizwe leZimbabwe" (English: "Blessed Be the Land of Zimbabwe"), was introduced in March 1994 after a nationwide competition to replace the South African-derived "Ishe Komborera Africa" with a distinctly Zimbabwean song. The winning entry was a Shona song written by Professor Solomon Mutswairo and composed by Fred Changundega. It was translated into English and Ndebele, the two other main languages of Zimbabwe. The Ndebele version is mainly sung in the Matebeleland regions of Zimbabwe, while the English version is not commonly sung. Some schools in Matabeleland South have introduced the Sotho/Tswana version.

== Lyrics ==
Because Zimbabwe has 16 national languages, the lyrics of the original Shona song were translated into the other 15 national languages as part of the 2013 constitutional reforms. The official texts were laid out in the 2013 Constitution, however the final English text in the Constitution varied from the more poetic and metrical version that had been in common usage up to that point and remains so today. Both the new official text and the more common variant are listed below.

In spite of all the translations being official and of equal standing according to the Constitution, the Shona and Ndebele versions remain the two most prevalent variants in regular usage.

=== English lyrics ===
English lyrics (constitutional)

I
O lift high, high, our flag of Zimbabwe
Born of the fire of the revolution
And of the precious blood of our heroes.
Let's defend it against all foes;
Blessed be the land of Zimbabwe.

II
Behold Zimbabwe so richly adorned
With mountains and rivers, beautiful.
Let rain abound and fields yield the seed
May all be fed and workers rewarded.
Blessed be the land of Zimbabwe.

III
O God, bless the land of Zimbabwe,
The land of our heritage,
From the Zambezi to the Limpopo.
May our leaders be just and exemplary,
Blessed be the land of Zimbabwe.

English lyrics (common, poetic)

I
O lift high the banner, the flag of Zimbabwe,
The symbol of freedom proclaiming victory;
We praise our heroes’ sacrifice,
And vow to keep our land from foes;
And may the Almighty protect and bless our land.

II
O lovely Zimbabwe, so wondrously adorned
With mountains, and rivers cascading, flowing free;
May rain abound, and fertile fields;
May we be fed, our labour blessed;
And may the Almighty protect and bless our land.

III
O God, we beseech Thee to bless our native land;
The land of our fathers bestowed upon us all;
From Zambezi to Limpopo
May leaders be exemplary; (Note: Often sung as "May our leaders be exemplary".)
And may the Almighty protect and bless our land.

=== Shona and Ndebele lyrics ===
Shona lyrics

I
Simudzai mureza wedu weZimbabwe
Yakazvarwa nemoto (Note: Written in the 2013 constitution as nemoto [ne.mo.to] but not often sung as such.) wechimurenga;
(Neropa) neropa zhinji ramagamba
Tiidzivirire kumhandu dzose
Ngaikomborerwe nyika yeZimbabwe.

II
Tarisai Zimbabwe nyika yakashongedzwa
Namakomo, (Note: Sometimes sung as nemakomo [ne.ma.ko.mo].) nehova, zvinoyevedza
(Ngainaye) mvura ngainaye, minda ipe mbesa
Vashandi vatuswe, ruzhinji rugutswe
Ngaikomborerwe nyika yeZimbabwe.

III
Mwari ropafadzai nyika yeZimbabwe
Nyika yamadzitateguru edu tose;
(Kubvira) kubva Zambezi kusvika Limpopo,
Navatungamiri vave nenduramo;
Ngaikomborerwe nyika yeZimbabwe.

Shona IPA transcription (Note: See Help:IPA and Shona language § Phonology and alphabet.)

1
[si.mu.d͡z̤a.i mu.re.z̤a we.ɗu we.z̤i.ᵐba.bwe]
[ja.ka.z̤ᵝa.rwa no.mo.to we.t͡ʃi.mu.re.ᵑɡa]
[(ne.ro.pa) ne.ro.pa ʒ̤i.ⁿd͡ʒ̤i ra.ma.ɡ̤a.ᵐba]
[ti.i.d͡z̤i.ʋi.ri.re ku.m̤a.ⁿdu d͡z̤o.se]
[ᵑɡa.i.ko.ᵐbo.re.rwe ɲi.ka je.z̤i.ᵐba.bwe]

2
[ta.ri.sa.i z̤i.ᵐba.bwe ɲi.ka ja.ka.ʃo.ᵑɡe.d͡z̤wa]
[na.ma.ko.mo ne.ɦo.ʋa z̤ᵝi.no.je.ʋe.d͡z̤a]
[(ᵑɡa.i.na.je) mʋ̤u.ra ᵑɡa.i.na.je mi.ⁿda i.pe ᵐbe.sa]
[ʋa.ʃa.ⁿdi ʋa.tu.skwe ru.ʒ̤i.ⁿd͡ʒ̤i ru.ɡ̤u.t͡swe]
[ᵑɡa.i.ko.ᵐbo.re.rwe ɲi.ka je.z̤i.ᵐba.bwe]

3
[mwa.ri ro.pa.fa.d͡z̤a.i ɲi.ka je.z̤i.ᵐba.bwe]
[ɲi.ka ja.ma.d͡z̤i.ta.te.ɡ̤u.ru e.ɗu to.se]
[(ku.b͡v̤i.ra) ku.b͡v̤a z̤a.ᵐbe.z̤i ku.sᶲi.ka li.mpo.po]
[na.ʋa.tu.ᵑɡa.mi.ri ʋa.ʋe ne.ⁿdu.ra.mo]
[ᵑɡa.i.ko.ᵐbo.re.rwe ɲi.ka je.z̤i.ᵐba.bwe]

Ndebele lyrics

I
Phakamisan’ if’legi yethu yeZimbabwe (Note: Written in the 2013 constitution as Phakamisan’ifuleg’yethu yeZimbabwe [pʰa.ɣa.mi.sa.ni.fu.le.gje.tʰu je.zʱi.ᵐba.bwe] but almost never sung as such.)
Eyazalwa yimpi yenkululeko
(Legazi) legaz’ elinengi lamaqhawe ethu
Silivikele ezitheni zonke;
Kalibusiswe ilizwe leZimbabwe.

II
Khangelan’iZimbabwe yon’ihlotshisiwe
Ngezintaba langemiful’ebukekayo.
(Kaline) izulu kaline izilimo zande,
Iz’sebenzi zenam’, abantu basuthe (Note: Written in the 2013 constitution as ‘Zisebenzi zename, labantu basuthe [zʱi.se.βe.ⁿzi zʱe.na.me la.βa.ⁿtu βa.su.tʰe] but almost never sung as such.)
Kalibusiswe ilizwe leZimbabwe.

III
Nkosi busis’ilizwe lethu leZimbabwe
Ilizwe labokhokho bethu thina sonke
(Kusukela) kusuk’ eZambezi kusiy’ eLimpopo.
Abakhokheli babelobuqotho
Kalibusiswe ilizwe leZimbabwe.

Ndebele IPA transcription (Note: See Help:IPA and Northern Ndebele language § Phonology.)

1
[pʰa.ɣa.mi.sa.n‿i.fle.gi je.tʰu je.zʱi.ᵐba.bwe]
[e.ja.zʱa.lwa ji.ᵐpi je.ᵑku.lu.le.ɣo]
[(le.ga.zʱi) le.ga.zʱ‿e.li.ne.ᵑɡi la.ma.k!ʰa.we e.tʰu]
[si.li.vʱi.ɣe.le e.zʱi.tʰe.ni zʱo.ᵑke]
[ɣa.li.βu.si.swe i.li.zwe le.zʱi.ᵐba.bwe]

2
[kʰa.ᵑɡe.la.ni.zʱi.ᵐba.bwe jo.ni.ɬo.t͡sʰi.si.we]
[ᵑɡe.zʱi.ⁿta.βa la.ᵑɡe.mi.ful.e.βu.ɣe.ɣa.jo]
[(ɣa.li.ne) i.zʱu.lu ɣa.li.ne i.zʱi.li.mo zʱa.ⁿde]
[izʱ.se.βe.ⁿzi zʱe.nam a.βa.ⁿtu βa.su.tʰe]
[ɣa.li.βu.si.swe i.li.zwe le.zʱi.ᵐba.bwe]

3
[ᵑko.si βu.si.si.li.zwe le.tʰu le.zʱi.ᵐba.bwe]
[i.li.zwe la.βo.kʰo.kʰo βe.tʰu tʰi.na so.ᵑke]
[(ɣu.su.ɣe.la) ɣu.suɣ‿e.zʱa.ᵐbe.zʱi ɣu.si.j‿e.li.ᵐpo.pʼo]
[a.βa.kʰo.kʰe.li βa.βe.lo.βu.k!o.tʰo]
[ɣa.li.βu.si.swe i.li.zwe le.zʱi.ᵐba.bwe]

=== In other regional languages ===
Chewa lyrics

I
O nyamulani mmwamba, mbendela yathu ya Zimbabwe
Yobadwa ndi moto wa nkhondo
Ndi gazi lofunikila la ngwazi zathu.
Tiyeni tiliteteze kwa adani onse;
Lidalitsidwe dziko la Zimbabwe.

II
Yang'anani Zimbabwe ya mphatso zambili
Ndi maphiri ndi msinje, zokongola.
Mvula igwe yambili ndi minda itulutse chakudya
Anthu onse akhuthe ndi a ntchito alipilidwe.
Lidalitsidwe dziko la Zimbabwe.

III
O Mulungu, dalitsani dziko la Zimbabwe,
Dziko la mphatso yathu,
Kuchokela ku Zambezi kufika ku Limpopo.
Atsogoleli akhale pa chilungamo ndi ubwino wowoneka.
Lidalitsidwe dziko la Zimbabwe.

Chibarwe lyrics

I
Simuzani mureza wathu waZimbabwe
Idabarwa namuriro wachimureuga:
Namaropa mazhinji amagauba
Tiyiziwirire zvikerema zventse
Ngarikomborerwe dziko raZimbabwe.

II
Ringani dziko ridatsimizwa
Namabango, naturudzi zvidadekesa.
Madzi ngaagwe, minda ipase poso
Waseenzi wadekedzerwe, dungwe rigorwe
Ngarikomborerwe dziko raZimbabwe.

III
Murungu komborerani dziko raZimbabwe
Dziko rawakuru wathu wakare tentse;
Kubuda kuna Zambezi mupaka kuna Limpopo.
Nawatungamiri waite ndaramo,
Ngarikomborerwe dziko raZimbabwe.

Kalanga lyrics

I
Milidzani fulegi yedu yeZimbabwe
Yakazwagwa nengwa yelununguko
Nelopa njinji lebagwi bedu
Tilidzibilile muzwita zose:
Ayipiwe mahha hango yeZimbabwe.

II
Lingani Zimbabwe Hango yakanaka
Nematombo nenjizi dzakanakisisa.
Vula ngayine minda ipembele
Bahingi balalame banhu bose bagute.
Ayipiwe mahha hango yeZimbabwe.

III
Ndzimu yengemadzani Hango yeZimbabwe
Hango yabobatategulu bedu tose
Kubva Zambezi kunoti Limpopo.
Nebatungamili babenendulamo.
Ayipiwe mahha hango yeZimbabwe.

Koisan lyrics

I
Tanka ho Fulegi tan ka ho,
Ka fulegi tan ka ho,
Tcuan tcuara tem a ka kui sa-ua hi nguu ua
E tuise ho we hi hum kadi,
Zimbabwe nguu uae

II
Zimbabwe tcanuu, e nahu e nyua hue hi,
Eshingisa e gǁawu gǁaua
Tcuara gǁawu, tcuan ire ǁa,
E tuise ho we hi nguu ka di,
Zimbabwe nguu ka di.

III
Dzimu tcuara tsau maa, hi nguu ka di, Zimbabwe di.
Hu mae tanuu,
Zambezi hua ninuu kua kuise, Limpompo, kua si ke ko.
Ha tcuan ira gǁo tconi ira ebkua ho tcan, e kairse tsau muari tcuan ua tca,
Hi nguu ka di Zimbabwe di.

Nambya lyrics

I
Nyamulani indembela yedu yeZimbabwe
Yakazwalwa nehondo yolusungunuko
Nelopa inji lyamagamba edu,
Tiyitabilije kuzwita zwose;
Ngaikombolelwe inyika yeZimbabwe.

II
Lingani Zimbabwe inyika inopenya
Namatunhu nenjizi zwinoyebeka.
Ngaine ivula ngaine zwilimwa zwiwande
Bashingi beshante nabanhu begute.
Ngaikombolelwe inyika yeZimbabwe.

III
Mwali kombolelani inyika yeZimbabwe,
Inyika yamatategulu edu isu tose,
Kuvila Zambezi kuswika Limpopo.
Batungamili bebe nobululami,
Ngaikombolelwe inyika yeZimbabwe.

Ndau lyrics

I
Murudzai mujeke, wedu weZimbabwe
Wakabarwa ngemwoto weChimurenga
Nengazi yemagamba
Tidziirire kuaengi eshe
Ngaikomborerwe Nyika yeZimbabwe.

II
Ringirai Zimbabwe Nyika yakatsvindiswa
Ngemakomo nenzizi zviinoyeveedza
Ngainaye mvura, ngainaye minda ipe mbeu
Vashandi vakudzwe ruzhinji rugutswe
Ngaikomborerwe Nyika yeZimbabwe

III
Mwari komborerai Nyika yeZimbabwe
Nyika yamadziteteguru edu
Kubvira Zambezi kuguma Limpopo
Neatungamiri aa nendaramo
Ngaikomborerwe Nyika yeZimbabwe

Shangani lyrics

I
Tlakusani mujeko wa hina waZimbabwe.
Yi nga tswariwa hi ndzilo wa nyimpi
ya ntshuxeko na ngati yinyingi ya tinhenha.
Hi yi sivelela ka valala hinkwavo
a ri katekisiwe tiko raZimbabwe.

II
Langutani Zimbabwe tiko ri nga xongisiwa
hi tintshava na mikova swi khavisaka.
A yi ne mpfula masimu ya nyika.
Vatirhi va tsaka xitshungu xi xurha.
A ri katekisiwe tiko ra Zimbabwe.

III
Hosi katekisani tiko ra Zimbahwe,
tiko ra yakokwana va hina hinkwerhu,
ku sukela Zambezi ku kala Limpopo.
Na vurhangeri byi va na vunene,
a ri katekisiwe tiko ra Zimbabwe.

Sotho lyrics

I
Phahamisang fuleki ea rona ea Zimbabwe
E tsoetsoeng ka ntoa ea tokoloho
Le mal'amangata abahale ba rona
Re e tsireletse ho lira tsohle;
Ha le hlohonolofatsoe lefatse la Zimbabwe.

II
Talimang Zimbabwe eona e khabisitsoe
Ka lithaba ne linoka tse bohehango.
Pula ha ine lilemo li ate
basebeletsi ba atlehe, batho bakhure
Ha le hlohonolofatsoe lefatse la Zimbabwe.

III
Morena, hlohonolofatsa lefatse la Zimbabwe,
Lefatse la baholoholo ba rona,
Ho tloha Zambezi ho fihla Limpopo.
Le baeteleli ba eme nneteng,
Ha le hlohonolofatsoe lefatse la Zimbabwe.

Tonga lyrics

I
Amunyampule Ndembela yesu yaZimbabwe
Yakazyalwa aNkondo yaLwaangunuko
Abulowa bunji bwabasilumamba
Tuyitabilile kuli basinkondoma
Ngayilongezegwe nyika yaZimbabwe

II
Amulange Zimbabwe yo iidobeekedwe
Amalundu Amilonga iiyebeka
Mvula ngayiwe zilimwa zivule
Babeleki Bajane, Abantu Bakkute
Ngayilongezegwe Nyika yaZimbabwe

III
Mwami longezya nyika yesu yaZimbabwe
Nyika yabaMataata besu Iswe Toonse
Kuzwa kuli Zambezi kuya kuli Limpopo
Bazulwidi Babe chitondeezyo
Ngayilongezegwe Nyika yaZimbabwe

Tswana lyrics

I
O tsholeletsang godimo, folaga ya rona ya Zimbabwe
Ee tshotshweng ke ntwa ya kgololesego
Le madi ya megaka ya rona
Re le tshireletse mo go baba ba rona
Ka le segofatswe le fatshe la Zimbabwe

II
Bonang Zimbabwe ee kgabisetsweng
Ka di thaba le dinoka tse di ntle
Pula a ine le masimo a nnc le di dipoelo
Botlhe bas a tlhtoke dijo le babereki ba duelwe
Ka le segofatswe le fatshe la Zimbabwe

III
Modimo, segofatsa le fatshe la Zimbabwe
Le fatshe boswa jwa rona
Go tswa Zambezi go ya Limpopo
A baeteledipele ba rona ba ne le maotsholo a bone a a eletsegang
Ka le segofatswe le fatshe la Zimbabwe

Venda lyrics

I
Takusani tuḽaga yashu ya Zimbabwe
Ye ya bebwa nga nndwa ya mbofholowo
Na malofha manzhi a vhahali vhashu
Ri ḽi tsireledze maswinani oṱhe;
Kha ḽi fhaṱutshedzwe shango ḽa Zimbabwe.

II
Sedzani Zimbabwe ḽone ḽo shomedzwa
Nga dzithavha na milambo, i tamisaho.
Kha i ṋe, mvula kha i ṋe zwiliṅwa zwi ande
Vhashumi vha tondwe vhathu vha fure
Kha ḽi fhaṱutshedzwe shango ḽa Zimbabwe.

III
Murena fhaṱutshedza shango ḽa Zimbabwe
Shango ḽa vhomakhulukuku vhashu riṋe roṱhe
U bva Zambezi u guma Vhembe
Vharangaphanḓa vha vhe na ndulamo.
Kha ḽi fhaṱutshedzwe shango ḽa Zimbabwe.

Xhosa lyrics

I
Phakamisani flegi yethu yaseZimbabwe
Eyavela ngedabi lenkululeko
Ngegaz elininz' elamagorha ethu
Lisikhusele nakwiintshaba zonke
Malisikelelwe iLizwe laseZimbabwe

II
Jongan'iZimbabwe yon'ihonjisiwe
Ngeentaba ezintle nemilamb'emihle
imvula inethe nezityalo zande
'basebenzi bavun' abantu bahluthe
Malisikelelwe iLizwe lase Zimbabwe

III
Nkosi sikekelela iLizwe laseZimbabwe
ILizwe lemveli yethu thina sonke
Kusuk' eZambezi kusiy' eLimpopo
Iinkokheli zibenenyaniso
Malisikelelwe iLizwe laseZimbabwe

== See also ==
- National Anthem of Rhodesia
