= Languages of Zimbabwe =

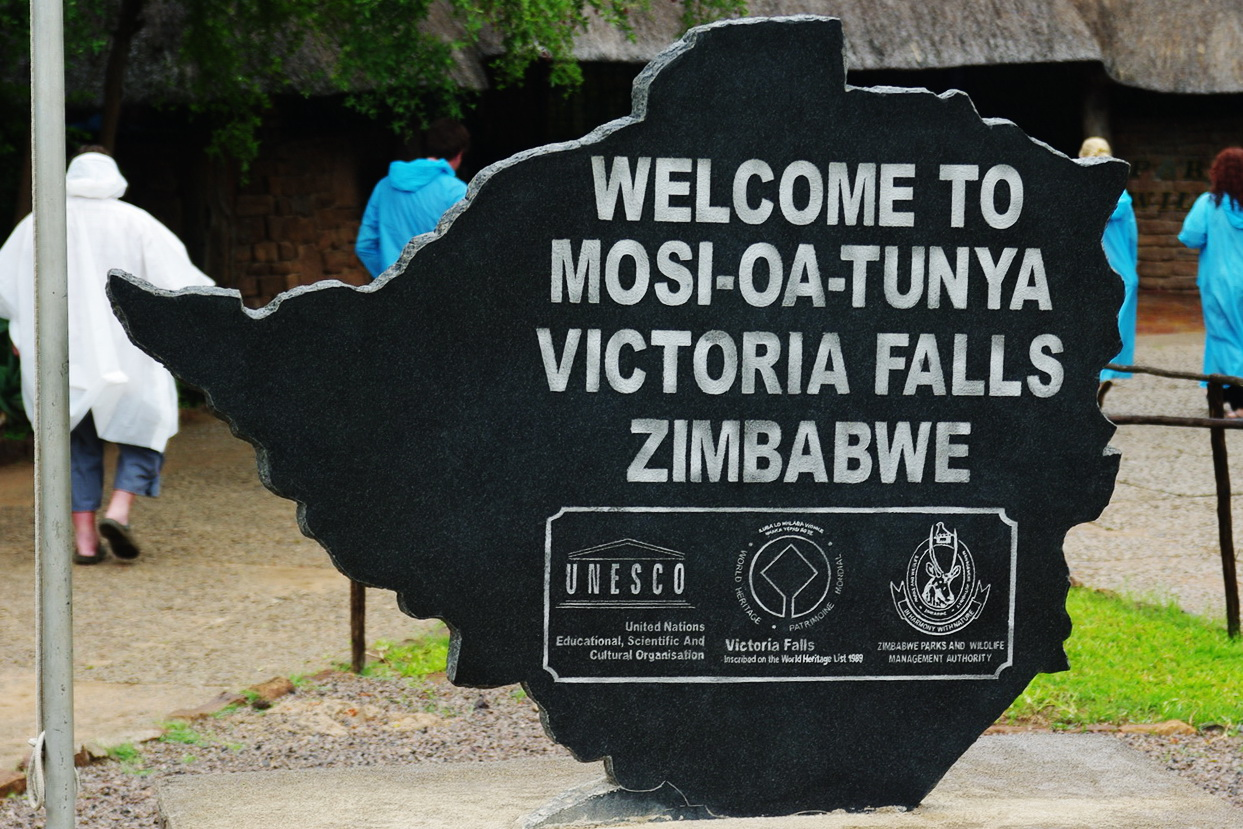
- Sign in English at Victoria Falls, with the falls' name in Lozi
- Official: Chewa, Chibarwe, English, Kalanga, Koisan, Nambya, Ndau, Ndebele, Shangani, Shona, Sign Language, Sotho, Tonga, Tswana, Venda, and Xhosa
- Main: Shona (~85%), Northern Ndebele (~40%), English (L1 <15%, L2 ~70%)
- Vernacular: chiShona, isiNdebele, Zimbabwean English
- Minority: Tumbuka, Kunda, Tsoa, Tswa, Lozi, Tjwao
- Immigrant: French, Punjabi, Hindi, Afrikaans, Chinese, Portuguese
- Signed: Zimbabwean sign languages, American Sign Language
- Keyboard layout: QWERTY (US)

Many languages are spoken, or historically have been spoken, in Zimbabwe. Since the adoption of its 2013 Constitution, Zimbabwe has 16 official languages, namely Chewa, Chibarwe, English, Kalanga, Koisan, Nambya, Ndau, Ndebele, Shangani, Shona, sign language, Sotho, Tonga, Tswana, Venda, Xhosa. The country's main languages are Shona, spoken by over 70% of the population, and Ndebele, spoken by roughly 20%. English is the country's lingua franca, used in government and business and as the main medium of instruction in schools. English is the first language of most white Zimbabweans, and is the second language of a majority of black Zimbabweans. Historically, a minority of white Zimbabweans spoke Afrikaans, Greek, Italian, Polish, and Portuguese, among other languages, while Gujarati and Hindi could be found amongst the country's Indian population. Deaf Zimbabweans commonly use one of several varieties of Zimbabwean Sign Language, with some using American Sign Language. Zimbabwean language data is based on estimates, as Zimbabwe has never conducted a census that enumerated people by language.

== Official language status ==
Since the adoption of the 2013 Constitution, Zimbabwe has 16 official languages: Chewa, Chibarwe, English, Kalanga, Koisan, Nambya, Ndau, Ndebele, Shangani, Shona, sign language, Sotho, Tonga, Tswana, Venda, and Xhosa. Zimbabwe is the country with the second largest number of official languages, after only Bolivia.

Prior to independence in 1980, English had been the official language of Zimbabwe's antecedents since the arrival of white rule in the region. During the Company-rule period in the late 19th and early 20th centuries, English was established as Rhodesia's official language by the British South Africa Company. In a 1918 letter written in response to an Afrikaner settler who complained about the Rhodesian policy of not allowing the teaching of Afrikaans in schools, the secretary to the Administrator of Southern Rhodesia wrote that "the official language of Southern Rhodesia has ever since the occupation of the country been English and ... no provision exists in the legislation of the territory for the recognition of a second official language."

English remained the official language when Southern Rhodesia was established as a self-governing Crown colony in 1923. During the UDI period from 1965 to 1979, English was retained as the official language of the unrecognised state of Rhodesia. Rhodesia's successor, the short-lived unrecognized state of Zimbabwe Rhodesia, designated English the "only official language" of the country. Zimbabwe Rhodesia was succeeded by Zimbabwe in 1980. Zimbabwe's original constitution, drafted in 1979 at the Lancaster House Agreement, did not name any official languages. By the time the new 2013 constitution was being drafted, English, Shona, and Ndebele had become the country's official languages. The Constitution requires that Zimbabwe equally promote each of its official languages, including in schools and in government.

== Main languages ==
=== Shona ===
Shona is a Bantu language spoken by roughly 87% of Zimbabweans and is one of Zimbabwe's official languages. It is the traditional language of Zimbabwe's Shona people, who live in Zimbabwe's central and eastern provinces. Shona has a number of dialects, including Karanga, Korekore, Manyika, Ndau, and Zezuru. Standard Shona is derived from the Central Shona dialects, especially Karanga and Zezuru. According to Ethnologue, Shona is spoken by roughly 9.8 million people, making it the most widely spoken Bantu language of Zimbabwe. The Manyika and Ndau dialects are listed separately by Ethnologue and are spoken by around 1 million and 2.4 million people, respectively. When Manyika and Ndau are added to the total, Shona is spoken by over 14 million people. There are over 80,000 Shona speakers in Botswana. They are found mainly in the villages of Mmandunyane, Tonota, Francistown, Selibe Phikwe, Gaborone, and other towns and villages in Botswana although Shona is not an official language in Botswana.

=== Ndebele ===
The Northern Ndebele language, also known simply as Ndebele, is an Nguni Bantu language spoken by the Northern Ndebele people of Zimbabwe's Matabeleland region. The Ndebele language is closely related to the Zulu language of South Africa, and developed in Zimbabwe in the 19th century when Zulus migrated to what is now Zimbabwe from the Zulu Kingdom in 1839. Along their way to Zimbabwe, European traders and missionaries confused the Zulus with the actual Ndebeles (southern Ndebeles).Today, Ndebele is spoken by roughly about 8.7% of the population and is one of Zimbabwe's official languages.

There is a small number of Ndebele speakers in the northeastern part of Botswana bordering Zimbabwe. Ndebele, however, is not an official language in Botswana.

== Other languages ==
=== Chewa ===
Chewa is a Bantu language spoken in northeastern Zimbabwe. Chewa is one of Zimbabwe's official languages.

=== Chibarwe ===
Chibarwe, is a Bantu language, mainly found in Malawi and Mozambique, with a small number of speakers in Zimbabwe. Chibarwe is one of Zimbabwe's official languages.

=== Kalanga ===
Kalanga is a Bantu language spoken by the Kalanga people of northwestern Zimbabwe. It is spoken by over 300,000 people, and is one of Zimbabwe's official languages.

Kalanga is spoken by over 300,000 people in Botswana. The language is, however, not an official one. Kalanga is predominantly in the North Eastern part of Botswana.

=== Koisan ===
Koisan, also known as Tshwa, is a Khoe language that is one of Zimbabwe's official languages.

=== Kunda ===
Kunda is a Bantu language spoken in eastern Zimbabwe, in the Mashonaland Central and Mashonaland West provinces. It was spoken by 145,000 people in Zimbabwe in 2000.

=== Lozi ===
Lozi, a Bantu language spoken primarily in southwestern Zambia, is spoken by roughly 70,000 Zimbabweans. There are over 30,000 Lozi/Rotsi speakers in Botswana. They are found mainly in Chobe district which comprises Kazungula, Kasane and surrounding small settlements bordering Zimbabwe, Namibia and Zambia. Lozi is, however, not an official language in Botswana.

=== Manyika ===
Manyika is in practice a dialect of Shona and is considered by all Zimbabweans to be Shona, though it is officially listed as a separate language. It is spoken by the Manyika people of Zimbabwe's easternmost province, Manicaland, as well as in Mashonaland East Province. In 2000, it had an estimated 861,000 speakers in Zimbabwe.

=== Nambya ===
Nambya is a Bantu language spoken by the Nambya people of northwestern Zimbabwe, particularly in the town of Hwange. It is closely related to the Kalanga language. It is spoken by nearly 100,000 people, and is one of Zimbabwe's official languages.

=== Ndau ===
Ndau is a Bantu language, often considered a dialect of Shona, that is spoken by around 2.4 million people in southeastern Zimbabwe and central Mozambique. It is one of Zimbabwe's official languages. Ndau is spoken in the southern of Zimbabwe

=== Nsenga ===
Nsenga is a Bantu language of Zimbabwe, Zambia, and Mozambique, occupying an area on the plateau that forms the watershed between the Zambezi and Luangwa river systems and Western Malawi land overshadowing Kachebere mountain called Mchinji.

=== Tsonga-Shangani ===
Shangani, also known as Tsonga, is a Bantu language spoken in southeastern Zimbabwe, as well as in Eswatini, Mozambique, and South Africa. It is one of Zimbabwe's official languages.

=== Sotho ===
Sotho, also known as Sesotho, is a Bantu language primarily spoken in South Africa and Lesotho, with a small number of speakers in Zimbabwe. It is one of Zimbabwe's official languages. There is a small number of BaSotho in Botswana at a village called Tlhareseleele; however, it is not an official language in Botswana.

=== Tjwao ===
Tjwao (formerly Tshwao) is an endangered Khoe language spoken by fewer than 20 people in the Tsholotsho District of Zimbabwe, all over 60 years of age. A slightly larger group of 100 have passive or partial knowledge of the language.

=== Tonga ===
Tonga, also known as Zambezi, is a Bantu language spoken by 1.5 million people in southern Zambia and northern Zimbabwe. It is primarily spoken by the Tonga people and is a second language for some Zimbabweans. Tonga is one of Zimbabwe's official languages.

=== Tswa ===
Tswa (Xitswa) is a South-Eastern Bantu language in Southern Mozambique. Its closest relatives are Ronga and Tsonga, the three forming the Tswa–Ronga family of languages.

=== Tswana ===
Tswana is a Bantu language that is one of Zimbabwe's official languages.

==== Tumbuka ====
Tumbuka, also known as Chitumbuka, is a Bantu language spoken in northeast Zimbabwe. It is closely related to other Bantu languages such as Shona and Chewa.

=== Venda ===
Venda is a Bantu language that is one of Zimbabwe's official languages. It is spoken in the northern part of South Africa around Mesina whereas in Zimbabwe, it's common in the southern area of the Limpopo river.

=== Xhosa ===
Xhosa is an Nguni Bantu language, most commonly found in South Africa, spoken by around 200,000 Zimbabweans, a little over 1% of the population. Xhosa is one of Zimbabwe's official languages. "Ishe Komborera Africa", the former Zimbabwean national anthem, was based on a Xhosa hymn. A small population of Xhosa is found in Botswana at a village called Bikwe and at Xhosa ward in Mahalapye village. Xhosa is not an official language in Botswana.

== Immigrant languages ==
=== Afrikaans ===
Afrikaans is spoken by a small minority of white Zimbabweans, the number of whom has declined significantly since 1980. Afrikaans speakers in Zimbabwe are typically Afrikaner immigrants from South Africa or their descendants. Afrikaners first arrived in what would become Southern Rhodesia in the early 1890s, recruited to be among the first pioneers by Cecil Rhodes, who sought to bring their agricultural expertise for the new region. They spread throughout the country, taking up farming and cattle ranching. Afrikaners settled in rural areas outside towns and cities, so they could sell their agricultural products. Bulawayo, Enkeldoorn, Umtali, Salisbury, and particularly, Melsetter, became Afrikaner population centers.

Afrikaner children, especially in rural areas, were initially educated in Afrikaans. However, following the Second Boer War, British colonial authorities increasingly demanded that Afrikaner schools teach in English. Despite Afrikaner complaints, the British South Africa Company, which governed the territory until 1923, would not budge. In a letter written in response to protesting Afrikaners, the secretary to the administrator of Southern Rhodesia wrote: "... the laws of the country make no provision for Dutch teaching, and even recently the Administrator has publicly stated that there is no prospect of change in the said laws." L. M. Foggin, the colonial director of education, warned in an official report: "I am convinced that if the concession of mother-tongue instruction were allowed in the schools of Rhodesia, it would result at once in Dutch districts in the teaching to the children of characteristic anti-British and anti-Imperial principles of the Nationalist party."

In spite of this issue, Afrikaners assimilated fairly well into the larger English-speaking white population, and were generally seen as loyal to the Southern Rhodesian government. Afrikaners preserved their language and culture through their own institutions. Dutch Reformed churches commonly conducted Afrikaans services in the morning, followed by services in English and indigenous African languages in the afternoon. An Afrikaans-language school, Bothashof, was established in 1911 in Bulawayo. An Afrikaner organisation, the Afrikaans Cultural Union of Rhodesia (AKUR), was established in 1934, and sought to preserve Afrikaner culture in Rhodesia, particularly through creating an Afrikaans press and by promoting the Afrikaans language in schools. A printing press was acquired, and AKUR began publishing Afrikaans daily newspapers and magazines, including Zambesi Ringsblad, Kern, Die Rhodesiër, and Die Volksgenoot.

Tension over language and cultural differences between Afrikaners and the English continued to exist, coming to a head in 1944, when the so-called "Enkeldoorn incident", in which an Afrikaner boy killed an English boy at the Enkeldoorn School, made headlines. A commission investigating the incident found that the incident was motivated by language and cultural tensions, which at the time were inflamed by World War II, as many English suspected Afrikaners of having German sympathies. Nevertheless, the Afrikaner population in Rhodesia continued to grow and more Afrikaner organisations were established, including the Afrikaner Youth in 1947) and the Association of Rhodesian Afrikaners (GRA) in 1965. The GRA soon became the preeminent Afrikaner organisation in the country, organising Afrikaner cultural activities and lobbying for greater Afrikaans language rights, particularly in schools.

By the late 1960s, the Afrikaner population in Rhodesia had grown to 25,000. After the mid 1960s, Afrikaners began to enter Rhodesian politics. Notable Afrikaner politicians during this period included several cabinet ministers: Rowan Cronjé, P. K. van der Byl, and Phillip van Heerden. Though the Rhodesian government under premier Ian Smith was on better terms with Afrikaners than previous governments, the issue of education remained. Bothashof, which had relocated to Salisbury in 1946, remained the country's only Afrikaans-medium school. In 1971, the Association of Rhodesian Afrikaners made an urgent call to the government, demanding that they open more Afrikaans-language schools, but the government ignored them. The Afrikaner population in Rhodesia peaked at 35,000 in 1975, and began declining thereafter. As Afrikaners emigrated to South Africa, Afrikaner organisations saw decline; the GRA gradually became less active. In 1977, the Rhodesian Afrikaner Action Circle (RAAK) was established in Bulawayo, and soon became the main Afrikaner organisation in the country. Kern and Die Rhodesiër, the two major Afrikaans newspapers in Rhodesia, were edited by RAAK members.

After Zimbabwe's independence in 1980, much of the country's Afrikaner population emigrated, most to South Africa. The GRA was disestablished in the early 1980s. A new Afrikaner organisation, the Afrikaner Community of Zimbabwe, was founded in April 1981 in Harare. Bothashof, the country's Afrikaans-medium school, saw its enrollment drop from 450 in 1980 to 160 in 1982. The school closed and reopened the next year as a multiracial, English-language school with an English headmaster, marking an end to Afrikaans education in Zimbabwe. By 1984, just 15,000 Afrikaners remained in Zimbabwe, a nearly 60% decline from ten years earlier.

=== Chinese ===
Chinese people in Zimbabwe are a small community that grew in size in the 2000s as an influx of Chinese shopkeepers settled in the country. it is estimated there are roughly around 10,000 Chinese people living in the country, making it a sizable community.

=== Dutch ===
A wave of Dutch-speaking immigrants from the Netherlands moved to Southern Rhodesia in the 1950s. Many of them remained in Rhodesia after 1965, when the colony unilaterally declared independence under a white minority government, as well as after Zimbabwe's independence in 1980. Many of them lost their farms during the country's land reform program in the early 2000s, with some leaving the country and others remaining.

=== German ===
German is spoken by a small minority of white Zimbabweans. The language first arrived in Southern Rhodesia during World War II, when the British set up five camps in the colony to hold thousands of Axis prisoners of war and internees, mainly Italians and Germans. Two of these camps, which opened in 1939–40 outside Salisbury, accommodated roughly 800 German inmates, who were former residents of Tanganyika. These prisoners were repatriated after war.

By the 1970s, a number of West German missionaries were present in Rhodesia. In 1978, the year two German missionaries were killed amidst the Rhodesian Bush War, it was reported that 30 German Jesuits were active in the country. In the years after Zimbabwe's independence in 1980, a number of German nationals took up farming in Zimbabwe. They were among those whose farms were confiscated during the land reform program in the early 2000s, and left the country.

=== Greek ===
The Greeks in Zimbabwe comprise about 3,000 people of Greek origin, almost half of them from the island of Cyprus. Zimbabwe currently hosts eleven Greek Orthodox churches and fifteen Greek associations and humanitarian organizations.

=== Gujarati ===
Gujarati is the traditional language of the majority of Zimbabwe's Indian population, many of whom are descended from immigrants from Gujarat. The Indian presence in what is now Zimbabwe dates back to 1890, when Indian plantation workers emigrated from South Africa into Southern Rhodesia. Indian immigration was restricted in 1924 when Southern Rhodesia attained self-government, but the Indian community still grew. Many Indian Zimbabweans left the country following the country's economic downturn that began around 2000. As of October 2016, an estimated 9,000 Zimbabwean citizens were of Indian origin, mostly Gujarati. An additional 500 Indian citizens were residents in Zimbabwe at that time. as there was racial segregation during the colonial period, Asians and Coloured people were allowed to intermarry resulting in many coloured people being also descendant of Gujarati and Hindi ethnic groups as well as to some extent afro-Asian descendants.

=== Hindi ===
Hindi is the traditional language of a minority of Zimbabwe's Indian population, most of whom are of Gujarati, rather than Hindustani, origin. The Indian presence in what is now Zimbabwe dates back to 1890, when Indian plantation workers emigrated from South Africa into Southern Rhodesia. Indian immigration was restricted in 1924 when Southern Rhodesia attained self-government, but the Indian community still grew. Many Indian Zimbabweans left the country following the country's economic downturn that began around 2000. As of October 2016, an estimated 9,000 Zimbabwean citizens were of Indian origin (it is unclear how many of these, if any, are Hindi speakers. An additional 500 Indian citizens were residents in Zimbabwe at that time.

=== Italian ===
Italian is spoken by a small minority of white Zimbabweans. The language first arrived in Southern Rhodesia during World War II, when the British set up five camps in the colony to hold thousands of Axis prisoners of war and internees. Three of these camps, set up in 1941–42 in Gatooma, Umvuma, and Fort Victoria, accommodated roughly 5,000 Italians, mostly from Somaliland and Ethiopia. After Italy's surrender in September 1943, the British began repatriating Italian internees and POWs, sending them to Port Elizabeth, South Africa, where they were taken home by ship. Other Italians were not sent home, but were simply let out of the camps, and some of these chose to remain in Southern Rhodesia. Italian prisoners of War were also used in construction of the Castle next to the Leopard Rock Hotel in the 1920s.By the early 2000s, there was still a sizable Italian population in Zimbabwe.

=== Polish ===
Polish is spoken by a small minority of white Zimbabweans. The language first arrived in Southern Rhodesia during World War II, when the colony hosted nearly 7,000 refugees from Poland. Polish refugees were housed at dedicated settlements set up at Marandellas and Rusape, two towns about 40 km (25 mi) apart to the south-east of Salisbury, from 1943. The Polish settlements in Southern Rhodesia were run jointly by local authorities and the Polish consulate in Salisbury; the Polish government-in-exile in London provided funding. Polish-language schools and churches were built for the refugees. After the Polish government-in-exile discontinued its operations and closed its consulate in 1944, the Polish refugees were increasingly viewed as a burden by the Southern Rhodesian government. A few began being sent home in May 1944, and transport back to Europe picked up sharply as the war came to a close, with less than 2,000 Polish refugees remaining by October 1945.

Colonial officials were reluctant to let the remaining Poles stay in Southern Rhodesia indefinitely, asserting that they were not culturally British enough and might have communist connections or sympathies. Additionally, the Poles were seen as lacking the skills and education that would allow them to compete against blacks in a free market. Despite these concerns, most of the Poles who remained showed little inclination to leave. By 1947, when the Rhodesian government offered repatriation to the remaining 1,282 Poles in the colony, only two women agreed. Despite pressure from the British government and the United Nations Refugee Programme, the Rhodesian government agreed to accept only 726 Poles as permanent residents, the bare minimum to meet the 10% per nationality required by international law.

== Pidgin languages ==
=== Chilapalapa ===
Chilapalapa, also known as Fanagalo, was a pidgin language used as a lingua franca between white, Asian, and Black people during the colonial period. Like its South African cousin Fanagalo, it was primarily spoken in the mining sector, on white-owned farms, and in larger settlements. According to one source, 60% of Chilapalapa vocabulary is of Ndebele origin, 20% from English, 10% from Shona, 5% from Afrikaans, and 5% from Chewa. Other sources describes the language as having primarily Shona influence rather than Ndebele.

Fanagalo originated in the 19th century in South Africa, and Chilapalapa, which is closely related, developed as white people began settling in Southern Rhodesia. As the majority of Black people at that time lacked the ability to speak English, Chilapalapa became a common lingua franca used by white and Asian people to communicate with Black people, and vice versa, usually in the context of work environment. Black people who spoke Chilapalapa generally lacked formal Western education and often did not speak English. Additionally, whites often demanded that blacks speak to them in Chilapalapa, not wanting to speak with them in English as it might imply an equal status among the races. Because it was often used demeaningly by white peopl, Black people often associated Chilapalapa with racism and colonialism. In contrast, white people viewed Chilapalapa more positively, even celebrating it as a unique facet of Rhodesian culture. The Rhodesian folk singer John Edmond recorded "The Chilapalapa Song", and newsreader and comedian Wrex Tarr routinely used Chilapalapa in his performances.

Though Chilapalapa was a widespread second language in Rhodesia, with several hundred thousand speakers in 1975, it was never commonly spoken outside work environments. It was used in towns, and in the farming and mining sectors, and was especially common in the Mashonaland region, but was never taught in schools or used in any official contexts. Written Chilapalapa literature was rare. Because of its lack of use in schools and formal contexts and due to its negative association with colonialism, use of Chilapalapa virtually disappeared after Zimbabwe's independence after 1980. Today, Chilapalapa is heard only occasionally being spoken between older white and Black people.

A 2018 survey of white farm owners, Asian store owners, and young Black teachers born after independence found wide disparities in knowledge of and attitudes toward Chilapalapa. Among those surveyed who grew up before independence, all were proficient in Chilapalapa. Among those born after independence, none could speak Chilapalapa, though most had heard of it. Attitudes towards the language differed, largely across racial lines. Most white and Asian people surveyed saw Chilapalapa as a useful lingua franca, while Blacks people viewed it as a symbol of racism and colonialism.

== Sign languages ==
Alongside numerous oral languages, sign languages are also used in Zimbabwe. Sign languages in Southern Rhodesia first developed independently among deaf students in different schools for the deaf beginning in the 1940s. It is unclear how many sign languages there are in Zimbabwe, and to what extent each is used, as little research has been done. The Glottolog, a language database maintained by the Max Planck Institute for the Science of Human History in Germany, lists seven varieties of indigenous Zimbabwean sign language: Manicaland Sign, Mashonaland Sign, Masvingo School Sign, Matabeleland Sign, Midlands Sign, Zimbabwe Community Sign, and Zimbabwe School Sign. American Sign Language is also reportedly used, though it is not clear to what extent. "Sign language", without further specificity, became one of Zimbabwe's official languages in the 2013 Constitution.

== See also ==
- Languages of Africa
  - Bantu languages
