= Lynn Zijenah =

Zimbabwe professor and researcher

- Citizenship: Zimbabwe
- Occupations: Researcher, Academic
- Title: Professor

Academic background
- Education: University of Cambridge

Academic work
- Discipline: Applied Biology
- Institutions: University of Zimbabwe

Lynn Zijenah is a Zimbabwean scientist, researcher and professor of Immunology, University of Zimbabwe.

== Education ==
Lynn Zijenah obtained her Bachelors degree(BSc) in Applied Biology from Thames Polytechnic, United Kingdom. She went on to receive her Masters degree(MSc) in Biophysics and Biochemistry from Memorial University of Newfoundland, Canada. She got her Doctoral degree(PhD) in Vascular Pathology from the University of Cambridge, United Kingdom.

== Career ==
Lynn Zijenah is currently a professor of Immunology at the Faculty of Medicine and Health Sciences, University of Zimbabwe, Harare, Zimbabwe.

Her research work focuses on preventing mother-to-child transmission of HIV, designing and development of tools for the prevention of transmission of HIV and Tuberculosis.

== Publications ==
- The role of KIR and HLA gene variants in HIV infection control: A review of African populations
- The World Health Organization Recommended TB Diagnostic Tools, Tuberculosis
- Higher serum 25-hydroxyvitamin D concentrations are associated with active pulmonary tuberculosis in hospitalised HIV infected patients in a low income tropical setting: a cross sectional study
- The Impact of Prostate Specific Antigen Testing on Incidence of Prostate Cancer cases in Zimbabwe
- Association of high serum vitamin D concentrations with active pulmonary TB in an HIV co-endemic setting
