= Nyasa languages =

Group of Bantu languages

Nyasa
- Geographic distribution: Malawi and surrounding areas
- Linguistic classification: Niger–Congo?: Atlantic–Congo; Volta-Congo; Benue–Congo; Bantoid; Southern Bantoid; Bantu (Zone N); Nyasa

Language codes
- Glottolog: sena1269 (Sena–Nyanja) tumb1250 (Tumbuka)

The Nyasa languages are an apparently valid genealogical group of Bantu languages. With the reassignment of a couple of Guthrie Zone N languages to other branches, Nyasa is essentially synonymous with Zone N. The languages and their Guthrie identifications are:

- Tumbuka (N21)
- Tonga language (Malawi) (N15)
- Chewa (Nyanja) (N31)
- Sena group (N40): Chikunda-Nyungwe (N42, N43), Sena (incl. Podzo, Rue) (N44)

The poorly known Mwera (Nyasa) language spoken at Mbamba Bay on the east side of Lake Malawi is classified as N201 and presumably belongs here as well.
