= We Who Follow =

Rhodesian patriotic song

Song
- Released: 1963
- Genre: March
- Length: 2:46
- Songwriter(s): Jack Watson

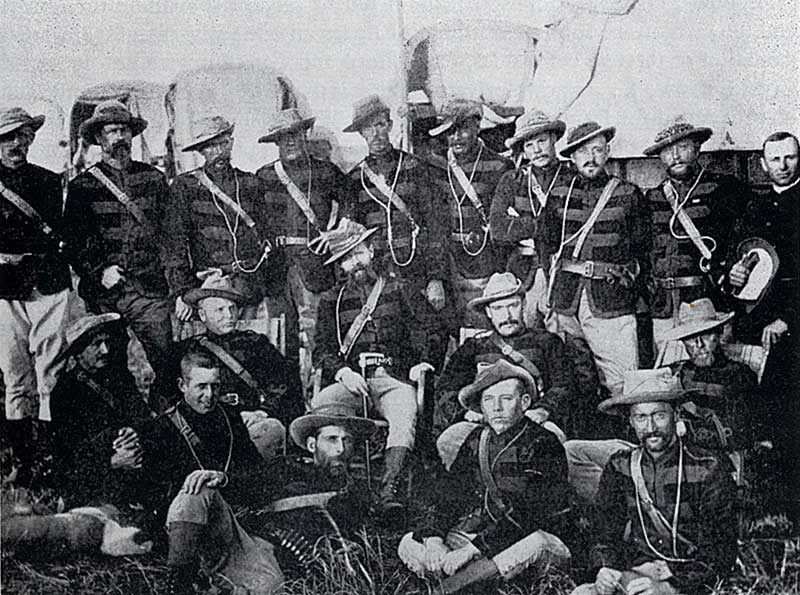
Officers of the Pioneer Column, 1890. The song's lyrics express concurrent admiration for and identification with the column.

"We Who Follow" is a Rhodesian patriotic song, written by Jack Watson. Written for a theatre show in 1963, it won a national song contest in 1966, and was thereafter popular until the country's reconstitution as Zimbabwe in 1980. Because of its contest victory, it is sometimes referred to as Rhodesia's "national song", which perhaps contributes to the occasional confusion between it and the Rhodesian national anthem, "Rise, O Voices of Rhodesia".

The lyrics of "We Who Follow" extol the virtues and achievements of the first Rhodesian settlers, particularly the Pioneer Column of 1890, and express the singer's self-identification with those figures and events. Admiration is extended to these colonial figures, as well as the sentiment that "to them this land we owe". At the end of the song, the singer declares "on guard for all they won we stand", and concludes that he will always defend and cherish Rhodesia, his homeland.

== Notes and references ==
Notes

Bibliography

- Allport, Richard (1996). Flags and Symbols of Rhodesia, 1890–1980. Johannesburg: Southern African Vexillological Association. ISBN 978-0-620-21797-2.
- Bolze, Louis W.; Ravn, Klaus (1966). More Life With UDI. Bulawayo: Louis W. Bolze.
