= Mbamba Bay language =

Bantu language spoken in Tanzania

Mwera
- Nyasa
- Native to: Tanzania
- Native speakers: 6,000 (2004)
- Language family: Niger–Congo?: Atlantic–Congo; Benue–Congo; Bantoid; Bantu; Nyasa?; Mwera

Language codes
- ISO 639-3: mjh
- Glottolog: mwer1247
- Guthrie code: N.201

Mbamba Bay is the language spoken along the shores of Mbamba Bay of Lake Malawi, variously (and ambiguously) known as Mwera or Nyasa. It is a poorly attested Bantu language of Tanzania.
