= Henry Hare Dugmore =

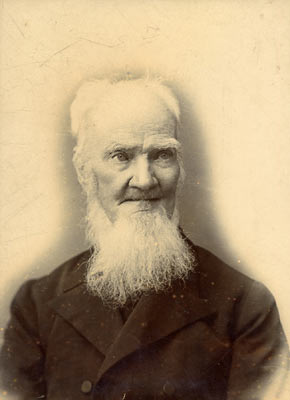
Henry Hare Dugmore c. 1890

Henry Hare Dugmore (1810–1896) was a British missionary, writer and translator. He was born in England to Isaac and Maria Dugmore and baptised in Birmingham on 5 June 1810. The family emigrated when his father was financially ruined after being forced to pay the debts of a relative for whom he had stood surety. The Dugmore family sailed to South Africa on the vessel Sir George Osborn in 1820 as part of the Gardner party of 1820 Settlers.

== Conversion and missionary work ==
In 1830 Dugmore became a committed member of the Wesleyan Methodist church, and began to study for ordination. In the late 1830s he was appointed as the successor to the missionary William Boyce, who ran a Wesleyan mission station in the rural Eastern Cape at Mount Coke, near King William's Town. Dugmore became fluent in the Xhosa language, and spent the next twenty years undertaking missionary work. He was jointly responsible for the first translation of the Bible into the Xhosa language, and composed a large number of Xhosa hymns, some of which are still sung today.

== Later life ==
In 1860, Dugmore moved to the town of Queenstown where he spent the rest of his life. He continued to write and became involved in a large number of clubs and societies. In addition, he became the focus of many visits by missionaries from Europe and North America, and he was noted for his oratory and public speaking on sacred and secular subjects in both English and Xhosa.

== See also ==
- Xhosa people
