= Sena people =

Ethnic group of Mozambique, Malawi, and Zimbabwe

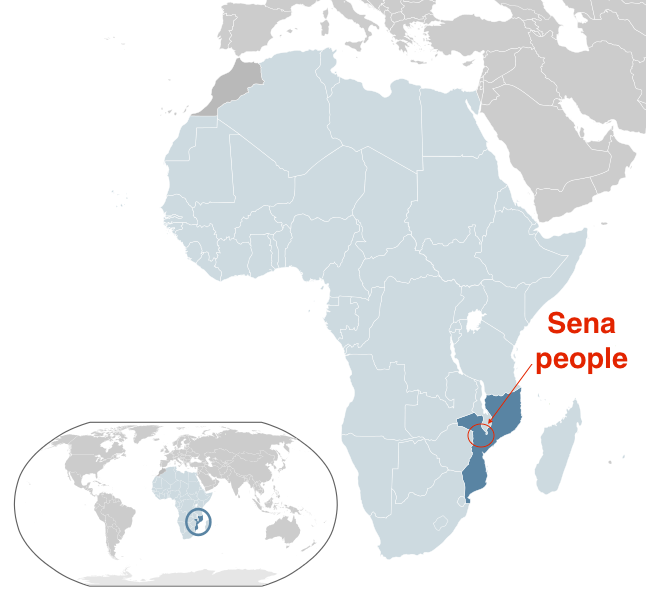
The geographical distribution of Sena people.

The Sena people are a Bantu ethnolinguistic group with origins in northwestern region of Mozambique, Sofala Province and Zambezia Province. They are also found in Malawi and Zimbabwe near their respective borders with Mozambique.

== Demographics and language ==
The Sena people's total population is around 2 million. It is estimated to be about 1.4 million in Mozambique, and about 0.5 million in Malawi. The Sena people in Malawi and Zimbabwe arrived from Mozambique and settled there in early 20th century as migrant laborers.

They speak the Sena language, also called Chisena or Cisena, which is part of the Bantu language family. The Sena language has many dialects.

== History ==
Historically the autocephalous Sena people were those between the two large cultures of Shona people – a major ethnic group of Zimbabwe, and the Nyanja-Chewa people – a major ethnic group of Malawi and Mozambique. The Sena people have lived mainly in the Zambezi River valley. According to Isaacman, the Sena represent an admix of people, exhibiting "most, though not all, of the characteristics of Shona cultural groups".

After the arrival in 1498 of the Portuguese explorer Vasco da Gama on an Mozambique island in his search of a sea route to India, the colonial influence began on Sena and other ethnic groups in this part of Africa. Few years later, a storm hit a caravan of the ships of his countryman Pedro Álvares Cabral trying to repeat Vasco da Gama's voyage, separating them. Some ships reached modern Brazil, where they founded a Portuguese colony. Others went around the Cape of Good Hope in South Africa and reached Sofala, a Mozambique trading town with a busy gold market. Their reports triggered a gold rush and a commitment by Portugal king to settle Mozambique region where many ethnic groups including the Sena people lived. In 1514, Antonio Fernandez confirmed there were rich goldfields in middle Zambezi valley, the traditional home of Sena people, and the Portuguese interest in colonizing this region grew.

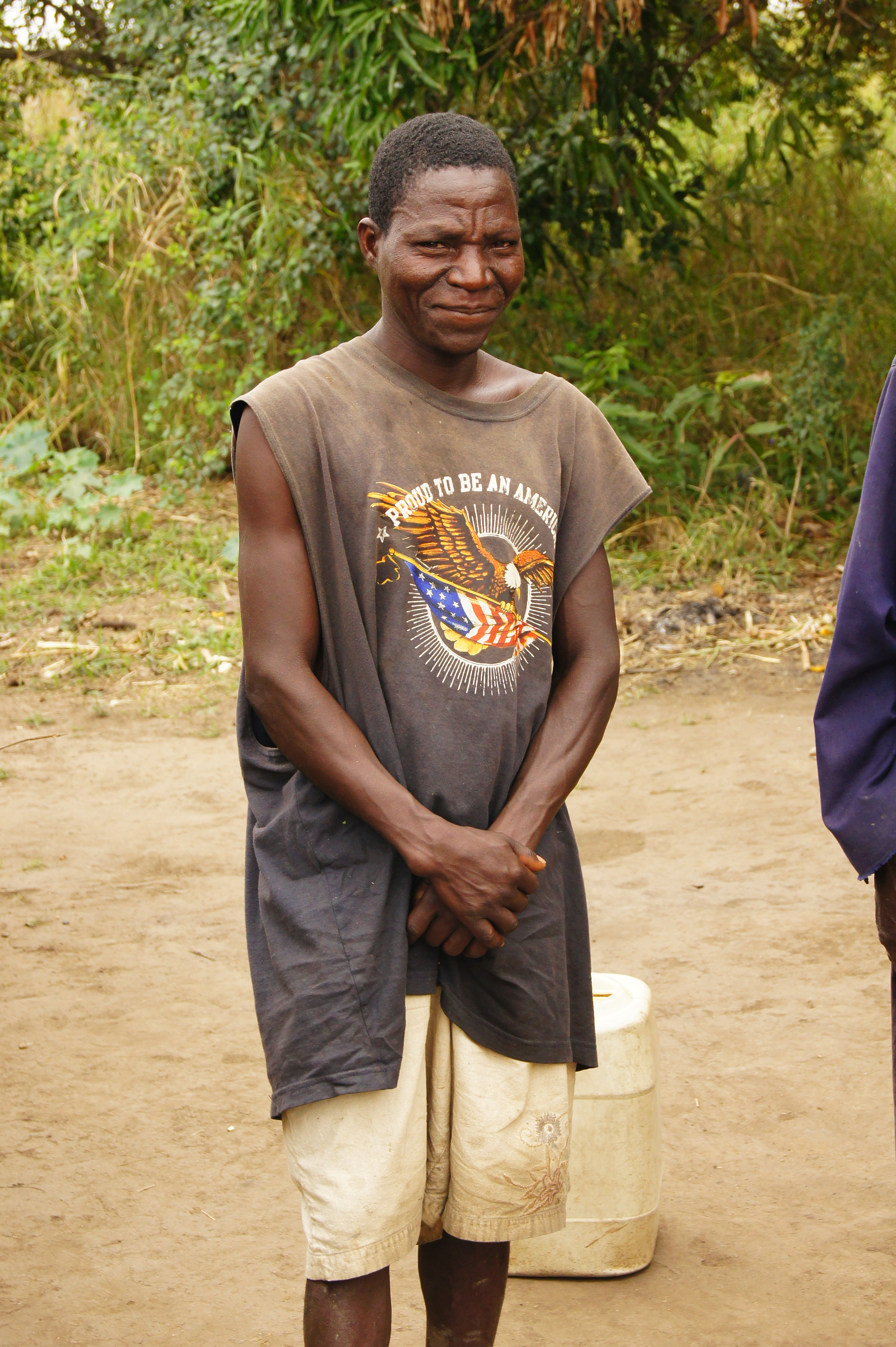
A Sena man from Mozambique.

Starting with the 16th century, Portuguese traders, farmers and missionaries arrived in the Zambezi valley (stations in Sena, Tete, Zumbo, Quelimane). The Portuguese settlers built farm estates in the river valleys, working them with African labor which included the Sena people. The interaction with the Portuguese settlers since the 1500s through the contemporary times have led to the Sena people absorbing many Portuguese customs. In 1531, Vicente Pegado founded a fair in a Muslim village along the Zambezi river, which then grew to become a major trading post, missionary center, colonial era garrison and market town. Pegado called this place Sena, and it is this Portuguese town after which the "Sena people" take their name.

The gold trade was lucrative, and of interest to both Arab traders and the Portuguese. By 1542, the Arabs who were established in northeast Africa, the Horn of Africa and along the Swahili coast regions of Africa had established alternate routes for the gold, bypassing the Portuguese towns in Mozambique coast and the Island of Mozambique. The Portuguese attempted to get a larger share of the gold production and trading by establishing a larger presence in the Zambesi valley and by taking aggressive military action against small Muslim controlled sultanates along the coasts of East Africa. By late 16th century, particularly after Francisco Barreto 1569-1575 expedition, the Portuguese had gained control of all the major mining and trading regions along the Zambesi valley where Sena people have lived.

In the 17th and 18th century, conflicts grew as did new causes for it. For example, the ivory demand and the ivory exports from Mozambique grew, followed by the demand for slaves outside Africa ravaging the Zambesi valley people as well as all others in the rivers of Sena region.

Slavery

The violence and capture of human beings to be sold as slaves grew in late 18th century, and both Islamic and Portuguese official documents of that era refer to slaves as Kafirs. Alternatively, the slaves for export were called Caporros by the Portuguese landowners inside Mozambique. Over 50,000 slaves were exported from Mozambique to Brazil, the Spanish America and the French colonies before 1800. This volume of slave capture and trading increased to a point where it caused major social disorder, when the governor of Mozambique issued an order to stop this abuse, curtail the movement of captured human beings, and end the slave trading that was supplying people across the Atlantic Ocean. In August 1792, states Capela, the Mozambique governor issued an order that, "no more Kafirs will be exported from the Rivers of Sena".

In the 19th century, the descendants of the colonial Portuguese who had been so far been farm and plantation owners using Sena people and other African labor en masse shifted into slave trading, particularly to the South American colonies of Portugal. Initially they sold captured human beings as slaves, later they started selling African men and women from their own farms. Larger operations of Prazos da Zambezia included operating ships and slave voyages, and many ports and ships from Mozambique catered to this trade. These operations were run by both genders, the Portuguese men and women. Official documents of the Governor-general Joaquim Pereira Marinho from 1840-1841 period state everyone was involved in this slave trading operations, from Portuguese to Moors, women of all ages, clergymen, civilians and soldiers in the Portuguese colony; it also describes how mujojos, or "dark Moors" would invade to steal slaves and export them from different ports and the Island of Mozambique.

The human abuse through slave capture and trading created increasing conflicts in Africa, as well as protests within Europe. Britain withdrew from slave trade, Brazil abolished slave imports in 1831, and by 1860s most major slave markets of the world had abolished slavery. These developments stabilized the lives and family units of the Sena people and other ethnic groups in the Zambesi valley as well as the rest of Africa. During the scramble for Africa the weakened Portuguese crown leased this region to British companies, which built the railway connections between the Indian Ocean and their colonies, in this case the TZR, Trans-Zambezi-Railway, between Beira and Njassaland/Malawi via Sena. Once Portugal under Salazar during the 1940s had gained control over the region, then it introduced forced cotton growing and forced labor "contracts" with British colonies.

== Colonial and civil wars ==
According to Kevin Shillington, Portuguese colonisation of the region developed from about 1505 through the 19th century, but it was never accepted by Sena people and other Africans. They resisted it, often with disruptions and sometimes with wars. Portuguese attempted various methods to subjugate, such as by sending religious missions in the 16th century to convert the people into cooperative Catholics, but the members of such missions were suspected of bad intentions and killed. Through the 18th century, Portugal partially succeeded in controlling the Zambesi river valley by granting Portuguese settlers imperial rights over the land with Portuguese military protection, with the settler-landowner called Prazeiro had the right to tax and exploit local people as labor, in exchange for tribute payments. Rebellions were common, but sporadic and lacked cohesion between various ethnic groups including the Sena, Tonga and Tawara peoples and sometimes within the same ethnic group.

By the middle of the 19th century, Achikunda slave armies emerged that would capture, kidnap and sell human beings as slaves for export. This period saw a period of Scramble for Africa in Mozambique, with Portugal sending in more military might to assert its powers, funding this by increased local taxation and forced labor called Chibalo. This triggered further violence against the Portuguese. Starting with 1884, the people staged a series of violent rebellions against the Portuguese. In 1897, the Portuguese attempted to collect an annual and steep "hut tax" from Africans, along with conscription of 2,000 African males for work, which the Sena people along with Tonga and Cambuenda peoples violently opposed. The Portuguese officials responded with military might, arrests and forced transfers of the local people into South African mines and South Rhodesian plantations between 1900 and about 1960, when a nationwide FRELIMO resistance congealed to overthrow the Portuguese rule and gain independence.

Mozambique gained independence in 1975, and the Sena people participated in the struggle for independence. Post-independence the ethnic groups failed to agree on constitution and laws for self-rule, expansion of its goal to liberate other parts of southern Africa where same ethnic group was under oppression such as Rhodesia (later Zimbabwe), and they were a party to and suffered the wars such as with Rhodesia and then during a civil war between RENAMO and FRELIMO.

== Society and culture ==
Sena people have been geographically distributed in a hot humid region. The heat means they traditionally wore few clothes, the women were bare-breasted and wore nsalu or chitenje cloth, which is a wrap around. Showing bare legs has been culturally considered as immodest, and both men and women try to keep it covered. During community dances, such as the Nyau dance, however, they wear very little clothing.

Sena people converted to Catholicism in bulk during the colonial era under the influence of Portuguese Christian missionaries, but some of the Sena people of Mozambique have held on to traditional beliefs in polygamy, child marriage and tribal religious practices. Their occupations have included farming, fishing and migrant labor. The Churches operating among the Sena people use an Africanized version of the Bible, and they ignore other versions. The version of Bible used by the Sena people, states Rhodian G. Munyenyembe, is the Buku Lopatulika, an old Chichewa version of the Bible. Traditionally, death rituals have been burials. Similar to neighboring ethnic groups in Mozambique, wedding among Sena people of river valley regions required a brideprice called lobolo which was a payment made to the family of the bride to compensate them for the loss of her work output in her birth home.

== See also ==
- Sena language
- Ndau people
