= Indians in Zimbabwe =

Indians in Zimbabwe

Total population
- 9,500 (500 Indian nationals)

Regions with significant populations
- Harare, Bulawayo

Languages
- English, Gujarati, Urdu, Shona, other Indian languages, Languages of Zimbabwe

Religion
- Hinduism, Islam, Jainism, Zoroastrianism, Christianity

Related ethnic groups
- Indian South Africans

The Indian presence in what is now Zimbabwe dates back to 1890 or earlier. Some scholars have suggested the similarities of the gold mining techniques carried out in southern Zimbabwe during ancient periods with the Indian ones, a brass cup of Hindu workmanship dated to 14th or 15th century AD has been found in Zimbabwean workings. During colonial period Indian plantation workers in South Africa crossed the border into Southern Rhodesia. A voluntary wave of Indian migrants also came at this time from the east, made up mostly of Gujarati men crossing the Indian Ocean to look for new opportunities. These men landed in Beira in Mozambique. Finding that immigration restrictions made it difficult for them to go to South Africa, they made their way across Mozambique, ending up what was then Southern Rhodesia. Further immigration was restricted in 1924 when the colony became a self-governing colony of the United Kingdom. The next year, entry of Indian migrants was restricted to wives and minor children of existing residents, with exceptions made on occasion for teachers and priests.

Indians in Zimbabwe have never made up more than one per cent of the country's population. In 1911, they numbered 2,912 as compared to the white settler population of 23,606, out of a total population of 771,077. By 1969, Asians still only numbered 8,965 as compared to 228,296 Europeans out of a total population of 4,846,930. The first migrants worked as traders, market gardeners, and laundrymen in the rural areas, often setting up stands on white farmers' land. They were eventually driven out of the reserves and into urban spaces by the Land Apportionment Act of 1930.

Most Indians in Rhodesia were Gujarati, hailing from the same villages. According to the 1921 census, there were 612 Hindus resident in the country, and 231 Muslims (with one Parsee and 113 identifying as ‘other’).

Indian Zimbabweans faced discrimination during colonial rule as a minority non-white population. Although most stayed out of active politics, some Indian Zimbabweans discretely channeled funds to anti-colonial movements. Many Indian Zimbabweans emigrated to South Africa, Botswana, and Zambia, as well as Australia and the United Kingdom, following the economic downturn in Zimbabwe that began in 1999.

As of October 2016, an estimated 9,000 Zimbabwean citizens are of Indian origin, mostly Gujarati. Prominent Indian Zimbabweans in politics include Senator Kantibhai Patel, who served as member of the Politburo and Central Committee of the Zimbabwe African National Union – Patriotic Front. Patel died in 2011, and was declared a national hero in 2012. Indian Zimbabweans Bharat Patel and Ahmed Ebrahim have served as justices of the Supreme Court.

Around 500 Indian citizens were residents in Zimbabwe as of October 2016. Most of them are professionals working in computer software, accounting and banking.

== Persecution ==
In the months before the Zimbabwean election, amongst widespread economic mismanagement by the Zimbabwean government, Zimbabwean president Emmerson Mnangagwa accused Zimbabwean Indians of hoarding basic goods, and threatened to seize their property.

== See also ==
- India–Zimbabwe relations
