= Kunda language =

Bantu language of Zimbabwe and Zambia

Kunda
- Cikunda
- Native to: Zimbabwe, Zambia, into Mozambique
- Ethnicity: Akunda
- Native speakers: (160,000 cited 2000)
- Language family: Niger–Congo?: Atlantic–Congo; Benue–Congo; Bantoid; Bantu; Nyasa; Sena (N40); Kunda

Language codes
- ISO 639-3: kdn
- Glottolog: kund1255
- Guthrie code: N.42
- ELP: Kunda

Pidgin Chikunda
- Native to: Mozambique
- Region: Zambezi River
- Extinct: (date missing)
- Language family: Kunda-based pidgin

Language codes
- ISO 639-3: None (mis)
- Glottolog: None
- Guthrie code: N.40A

Kunda (Chikunda) is a Bantu language of Zimbabwe, with some thousands of speakers in Zambia and Mozambique.

There is an extinct pidgin Chikunda once used for trade.
