= Solomon Mutswairo =

Zimbabwean writer (1924–2005)

Solomon Mangwiro Mutswairo, also spelt Mutsvairo (26 April 1924 – November 2005), was a Zimbabwean novelist and poet. A member of the Zezuru people of central Zimbabwe, he wrote the first novel in the Shona language, Feso.

In his late years, Mutswairo was a central figure in Zimbabwean academic and cultural circles. He was the first person to be named Writer-in-Residence at the University of Zimbabwe, and was the Chairman of the National Arts Council of Zimbabwe during the late 1990s. Mutswairo wrote the text for "Simudzai mureza weZimbabwe", the Zimbabwean national anthem.

== Literary contributions ==
Feso, originally published in Zezuru in 1957 when Zimbabwe was still the colony of Southern Rhodesia, is a narrative with subtle political implications set several hundreds years ago, before colonization. Beyond the use of the Shona language itself, the novel incorporates a number of features of traditional Zezuru oral culture, including song and storytelling techniques. Despite Mutswairo's association with the small intellectual elite in the country, Feso was widely read, and even taught in schools, until it was banned by the Rhodesian government in the mid-1960s.

Mutswairo began studying in the United States in the early 1960s, originally through a Fulbright grant. He ultimately received his Ph.D. from Howard University in 1978, with a doctoral dissertation titled Oral Literature in Zimbabwe: An Analytico-Interpretive Approach. Though his research in Zimbabwean oral culture has been useful for both African and Western scholars, he has been considered something of a revisionist historian in his own country. He provoked some controversy by arguing, in a series of televised debates, that the Shona people should be referred to instead as "Mbire".

Later in life, Mutswairo wrote both poetry and prose in English. His two explicitly political historical novels, about 19th-century pro-independence figure Kadungure Mapondera and Chaminuka, a sage from Zimbabwean folklore, were both written in English, and his English poetry is in a similar vein. In "The Picture of Nahanda and Kagubi", Mutswairo laments the fate of Nehanda Nyakasikana, a woman who was executed after inspiring a fight for independence in the 19th century:

Why, now, Nehanda Nyakasikana,
Do you close your eyes, Mufakose,
With your face gently lowered
And your eyes staring long
And looking down—heavy with tears…

Mutswairo explained that his poetry is more influenced by English poetry, with its regular meters, while traditional Shona poetry, based in repetition often found its way into his prose. Since he also translated his own work in both directions, he acquired an unusually rich sense of the relationship between the two. He found, he says, intuitive ways of making leaps from one to the other, even if they sometimes defy word-for-word translation:

For example, an idiomatic expression like Chauinacho batisisa midzimu haipe kaviri: "What you have, hold on to it fast because the ancestors will not give it to you again." If you wrote it the way I'm saying it now, it wouldn't make sense. Maybe it might be better to say, "A bird in hand is worth two in a bush." And this has given you a totally different use although the idea is the same. So, there are many such expressions that are not synonymous, but somehow you can get the equivalent.

== Major works in English ==
- Feso. Washington: Three Continents Press, 1974.
- Zimbabwe: Prose and Poetry (as editor and contributor). Washington: Three Continents, 1974.
- Mapondera, Soldier of Zimbabwe. Washington: Three Continents, 1978.
- Chaminuka, Prophet of Zimbabwe. Washington: Three Continents, 1983.
- Introduction to Shona Culture. Zimbabwe: Juta Zimbabwe, 1996.
