= Xhosa language =

Nguni language of southern South Africa

Xhosa
- isiXhosa
- Pronunciation: [ìsíᵏǁʰɔ́sà]
- Native to: South Africa; Lesotho
- Region: eastern Eastern Cape; scattered communities elsewhere
- Ethnicity: AmaXhosa
- Native speakers: 8 million (2013); 11 million L2 speakers (2002)
- Language family: Niger–Congo?: Atlantic–Congo; Volta-Congo; Benue–Congo; Bantoid; Southern Bantoid; Bantu; Southern Bantu; Nguni-Tsonga; Nguni; Zunda; Xhosa
- Writing system: Latin (Xhosa alphabet); Xhosa Braille; Ditema tsa Dinoko
- Signed forms: Signed Xhosa

Official status
- Official language in: South Africa; Zimbabwe
- Recognised minority language in: Botswana

Language codes
- ISO 639-1: xh
- ISO 639-2: xho
- ISO 639-3: xho
- Glottolog: xhos1239
- Guthrie code: S.41
- Linguasphere: 99-AUT-fa incl. varieties 99-AUT-faa to 99-AUT-faj + 99-AUT-fb (isiHlubi)
- Proportion of the South African population that speaks Xhosa at home 0–20% 20–40% 40–60% 60–80% 80–100%

Xhosa (/ˈkoʊsə/ KOH-sə, Xhosa: [ᵏǁʰôːsa]), formerly spelled Xosa and also known by its endonym isiXhosa, is a Bantu language, indigenous to Southern Africa and one of the official languages of South Africa and Zimbabwe.

Xhosa is spoken as a first language by approximately 8 million people and as a second language in South Africa, particularly in Eastern Cape, Western Cape, Northern Cape and Gauteng, and also in parts of Zimbabwe and Lesotho. It has perhaps the heaviest functional load of click consonants in a Bantu language (approximately tied with Yeyi), with one count finding that 10% of basic vocabulary items contained a click.

== Classification ==
Xhosa is part of the branch of Nguni languages, which also include Zulu, Southern Ndebele and Northern Ndebele, called the Zunda languages. Zunda languages effectively form a dialect continuum of variously mutually intelligible varieties.

Xhosa is, to a large extent, mutually intelligible with Zulu and with other Nguni languages to a lesser extent. Nguni languages are, in turn, classified under the much larger abstraction of Bantu languages.

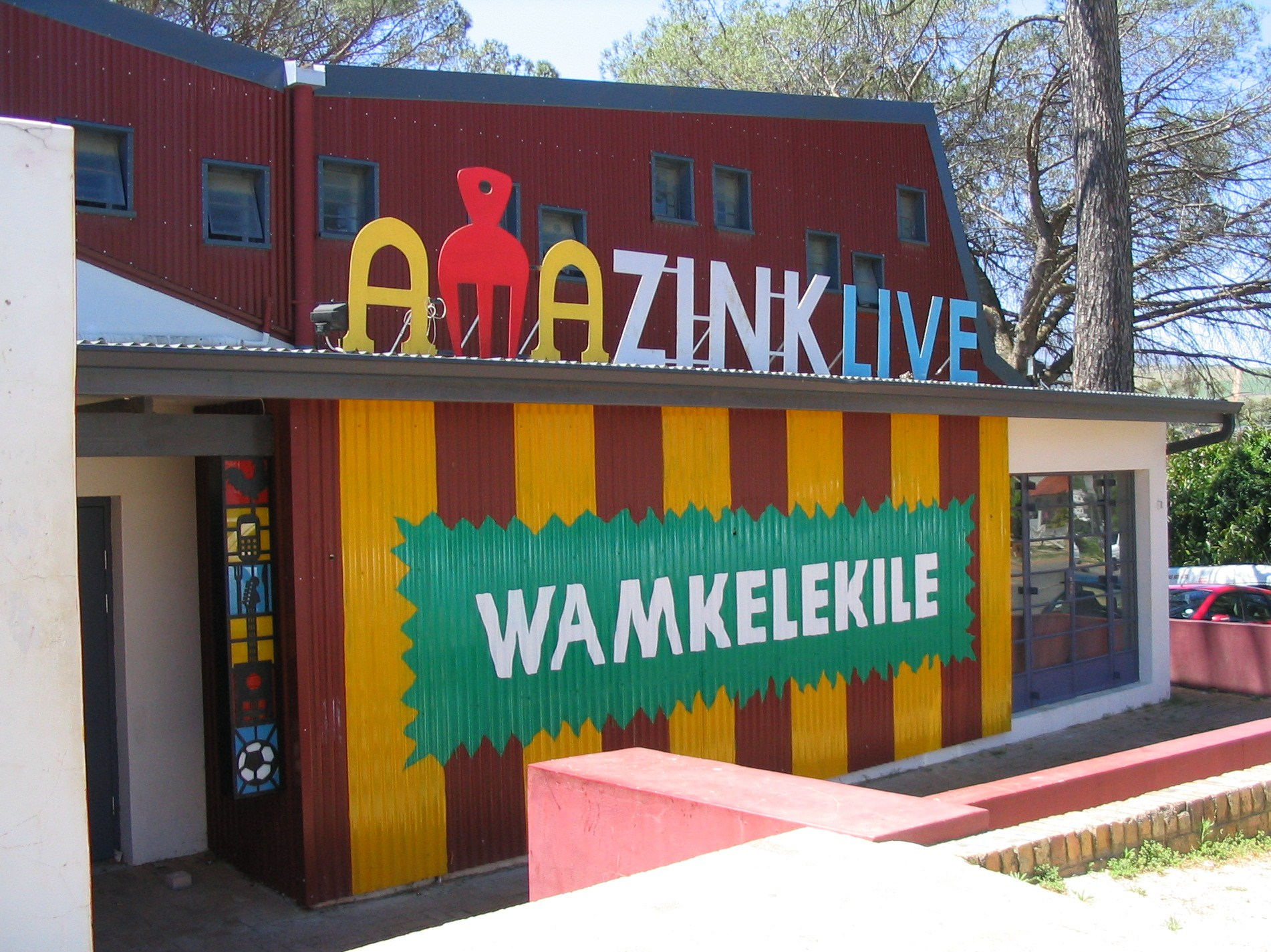
Sign outside the AmaZink township theatre restaurant in Kayamandi, welcoming visitors in Xhosa

== Geographical distribution ==
Geographical distribution of the Xhosa in South Africa: pop. density of native speakers of Xhosa < 1 /km² 1–3 /km² 3–10 /km² 10–30 /km² 30–100 /km² 100–300 /km² 300–1000 /km² 1000–3000 /km² > 3000 /km²

Xhosa is the most widely distributed African language in South Africa, though the most commonly spoken South African language is Zulu. Xhosa is the second most common Bantu home language in South Africa. As of 2003 approximately 5.3 million Xhosa-speakers, the majority, live in the Eastern Cape, followed by the Western Cape (approximately 1 million), Gauteng (671,045), the Free State (246,192), KwaZulu-Natal (219,826), North West (214,461), Mpumalanga (46,553), the Northern Cape (51,228), and Limpopo (14,225). There is a small but significant Xhosa community of about 200,000 in Zimbabwe. Also, a small community of Xhosa speakers (18,000) live in Quthing District, Lesotho.

== Orthography ==
=== Latin script ===
The Xhosa language uses the 26 basic letters of the Latin alphabet, with digraphs, trigraphs, and even tetragraphs being used to represent some sounds. Tone, stress, and vowel length are generally not indicated in writing. For further details, see the phonology section below.

== Phonology ==
Spoken Xhosa

=== Vowels ===
Xhosa has an inventory of ten vowels: [a], [ɛ~e], [i], [ɔ~o] and [u] written a, e, i, o and u in order, all occurring in both long and short.

Xhosa vowel phonemes
	Front		Back	
	short	long	short	long
Close	i ⟨i⟩	iː ⟨ii⟩	u ⟨u⟩	uː ⟨uu⟩
Mid	ɛ ⟨e⟩	eː ⟨ee⟩	ɔ ⟨o⟩	oː ⟨oo⟩
Open			a ⟨a⟩	aː ⟨aa⟩

=== Tones ===
Xhosa is a tonal language with two inherent phonemic tones: low and high. Tones are rarely marked in the written language, but they can be indicated ⟨a⟩ [à], ⟨á⟩ [á], ⟨â⟩ [áà], ⟨ä⟩ [àá]. Long vowels are phonemic but are usually not written except for ⟨â⟩ and ⟨ä⟩, which are each sequence of two vowels with different tones that are realized as long vowels with contour tones (⟨â⟩ high–low = falling, ⟨ä⟩ low–high = rising).

=== Consonants ===
Xhosa is rich in uncommon consonants. Besides pulmonic egressive sounds, which are found in all spoken languages, it has a series of ejective stops and one implosive stop. It has 15 to 21 click consonants, depending on speaker and dialect; in comparison, Juǀʼhoan, spoken in Botswana and Namibia, has 48, and Taa, with roughly 4,000 speakers in Botswana, has 83.

The following table lists the consonant phonemes of the language, with the pronunciation in IPA on the left and the orthography on the right:

		Labial	Dental/Alveolar		Post- alveolar	Velar		Glottal
		Labial	median	lateral	Post- alveolar	median	lateral	Glottal
Click	tenuis/ejective (Note: These are variably tenuis pulmonic to ejective; the ejection tends to be weak even when present. With clicks, only the rear articulation is ejective.)		ᵏǀʼ ⟨c⟩	ᵏǁʼ ⟨x⟩	ᵏǃʼ ⟨q⟩			
Click	aspirated		ᵏǀʰ ⟨ch⟩	ᵏǁʰ ⟨xh⟩	ᵏǃʰ ⟨qh⟩			
Click	slack voice		ᶢ̥ǀʱ ⟨gc⟩	ᶢ̥ǁʱ ⟨gx⟩	ᶢ̥ǃʱ ⟨gq⟩			
Click	nasal		ᵑǀ ⟨nc⟩	ᵑǁ ⟨nx⟩	ᵑǃ ⟨nq⟩			
Click	slack-voice nasal (Note: These are analogous to the slack-voice nasals ⟨mh, nh⟩ etc. They are not prenasalized, as can be seen in words such as ⟨umngqokolo⟩ (overtone singing) and ⟨umngqusho⟩ in which they are preceded by a nasal.) (Note: Prior to 1942, the orthography distinguished slack-voice nasal ⟨nch, nqh, nxh⟩ and prenasalized slack voice ⟨ngc, ngq, ngx⟩. However, this caused confusion in dialect areas where the two series were merged, so they were unified in the orthography. [Bonny Sands, in press, Non-pulmonics: isiXhosa.)		ᵑǀʱ ⟨ngc⟩	ᵑǁʱ ⟨ngx⟩	ᵑǃʱ ⟨ngq⟩			
Click	prenasalized tenuis/ejective (Note: Incorrectly described as glottal clicks by Nurse, Derek. The Bantu Languages. p. 616. The isiXhosa clicks are not glottalized nasal clicks like those of Nama; they are prenasalized and tenuis/ejective, as maintained by Xhosa linguists like Saul.)		ŋᵏǀʼ ⟨nkc⟩	ŋᵏǁʼ ⟨nkx⟩	ŋᵏǃʼ ⟨nkq⟩			
Click	prenasalized slack voice		ŋᶢ̥ǀʱ ⟨ngc⟩	ŋᶢ̥ǁʱ ⟨ngx⟩	ŋᶢ̥ǃʱ ⟨ngq⟩			
Plosive	tenuis/ejective	pʼ ⟨p⟩	tʼ ⟨t⟩		t̠ʲʼ ⟨ty⟩	kʼ ⟨k⟩		ʔ (Note: The unwritten glottal stop is present in words like uku(ʔ)ayinela "to iron", uku(ʔ)a(ʔ)aza "to stutter", uku(ʔ)amza "to stall".)
Plosive	aspirated	pʰ ⟨ph⟩	tʰ ⟨th⟩		t̠ʲʰ ⟨tyh⟩	kʰ ⟨kh⟩		
Plosive	slack voice	b̥ʱ ⟨bh⟩	d̥ʱ ⟨d⟩		d̠̥ʲʱ ⟨dy⟩	ɡ̊ʱ ⟨g⟩		
Plosive	implosive	ɓ ⟨b⟩						
Affricate	ejective		tsʼ ⟨ts⟩		tʃʼ ⟨tsh⟩	kxʼ ⟨kr⟩	k𝼄ʼ ⟨kl⟩ (Note: The onset cluster /kl/ from phonologized loanwords such as ikliniki "the clinic" can be realized as a single consonant [kʟ̥ʼ].)	
Affricate	aspirated		tsʰ ⟨ths⟩		tʃʰ ⟨thsh⟩	kxʰ ⟨krh⟩		
Affricate	slack voice		d̥zʱ ⟨dz⟩ (Note: These two consonants, [dz] and [dz̤], are found in loans. Both are spelled ⟨dz⟩, the same as the consonant [d̥zʱ].)		d̥ʒʱ ⟨j⟩			
Fricative	voiceless	f ⟨f⟩	s ⟨s⟩	ɬ ⟨hl⟩	ʃ ⟨sh⟩	x ⟨rh⟩		h ⟨h⟩
Fricative	slack voice	v̤ ⟨v⟩ (Note: In informal writing, this murmured consonant can sometimes be seen spelled as ⟨vh⟩ as in ukuvha, but this is non-standard.)	z̤ ⟨z⟩	ɮ̤ ⟨dl⟩	ʒ̤ ⟨zh⟩ (Note: These two consonants, [ʒ] and [ʒ̤], are found in borrowings. Both are spelled ⟨zh⟩.)	ɣ̤ ⟨gr⟩		ɦ ⟨hh⟩
Nasal	fully voiced	m ⟨m⟩	n ⟨n⟩		n̠ʲ ⟨ny⟩	ŋ ⟨ngʼ⟩		
Nasal	slack voice	m̤ ⟨mh⟩	n̤ ⟨nh⟩		n̠̤ʲ ⟨nyh⟩	ŋ̤ ⟨ngh⟩ (Note: This consonant, [ŋ̤], is found in loans. It is spelled ⟨ngh⟩.)		
Liquid	fully voiced		r ⟨r⟩ (Note: These two consonants, [r] and [r̤], are found in borrowings. Both are spelled ⟨r⟩.)	l ⟨l⟩				
Liquid	breathy voiced		r̤ ⟨r⟩	l̤ ⟨lh⟩				
Semivowel	fully voiced				j ⟨y⟩ (Note: Sequences of /jw/ as in ukushiywa "abandonment" are phonologically realized [ɥ], but this sound is non-phonemic.)	w ⟨w⟩		
Semivowel	slack voice				j̤ ⟨yh⟩	w̤ ⟨wh⟩		

In addition to the ejective affricate [tʃʼ], the spelling ⟨tsh⟩ may also be used for either of the aspirated affricates [tsʰ] and [tʃʰ].

The breathy voiced glottal fricative [ɦ] is sometimes spelled ⟨h⟩.

The ejectives tend to be ejective only in careful pronunciation or in salient positions and, even then, only for some speakers. Otherwise, they tend to be tenuis (plain) stops. Similarly, the tenuis (plain) clicks are often glottalised, with a long voice onset time, but that is uncommon.

The murmured clicks, plosives and affricates are only partially voiced, with the following vowel murmured for some speakers. That is, da may be pronounced [dʱa̤] (or, equivalently, [d̥a̤]). They are better described as slack voiced than as breathy voiced. They are truly voiced only after nasals, but the oral occlusion is then very short in stops, and it usually does not occur at all in clicks. Therefore, the absolute duration of voicing is the same as in tenuis stops. (They may also be voiced between vowels in some speaking styles.) The more notable characteristic is their depressor effect on the tone of the syllable.

==== Consonant changes with prenasalisation ====
When consonants are prenasalised, their pronunciation and spelling may change. The murmur no longer shifts to the following vowel. Fricatives become affricated and, if voiceless, they become ejectives as well: mf is pronounced [ɱp̪fʼ], ndl is pronounced [ndɮ], n+hl becomes ntl [ntɬʼ], n+z becomes ndz [ndz], n+q becomes [n͡ŋǃʼ] etc. The orthographic b in mb is the voiced plosive [mb]. Prenasalisation occurs in several contexts, including on roots with the class 9 prefix /iN-/, for example on an adjective which is feature-matching its noun:

/iN- + ɬɛ/ → intle "beautiful" (of a class 9 word like inja "dog")

When aspirated clicks (⟨ch, xh, qh⟩) are prenasalised, the silent letter ⟨k⟩ is added (⟨nkc, nkx, nkq⟩) to prevent confusion with the nasal clicks ⟨nc, nx, nq⟩, and are actually distinct sounds. The prenasalized versions have a very short voicing at the onset which then releases in an ejective, like the prenasalized affricates, while the phonemically nasal clicks have a very long voicing through the consonant. When plain voiceless clicks (⟨c, x, q⟩) are prenasalized, they become slack voiced nasal (⟨ngc, ngx, ngq⟩).

List of consonant changes with prenasalisation
Phoneme	Prenasalised	Examples (roots with class 10 /iiN-/ prefix)	Rule
/pʰ/, /tʰ/, /t̠ʲʰ/, /kʰ/, /ǀʰ/, /ǁʰ/, /ǃʰ/	[mpʼ], [ntʼ], [n̠t̠ʲʼ], [ŋkʼ], [n̪͡ŋǀʼ], [n͡ŋǁʼ], [n̠͡ŋǃʼ]	phumla "to rest" → iimpumlo "noses"; thetha "to speak" → iintetho "speeches"; tyhafa "to weaken" → iintyafo "weaknesses"; khathala "care about" → iinkathalo "cares"; chazela "explain" → inkcazelo "information"; xhasa "to support" → inkxaso "support"; qhuba "to drive" → inkqubo "process"	Aspiration is lost on obstruents.
/t̠ʲ/	/n̠d̠ʲ/	tyeba "to be rich" → iindyebo "wealths"	Voiceless palatal plosive becomes voiced.
/ǀ/, /ǁ/, /ǃ/	/ŋǀʱ/, /ŋǁʱ/, /ŋǃʱ/	ucango "door" → iingcango "doors"; uxande "rectangle" → iingxande "rectangles"; uqeqesho "training" → iingqeqesho "trainings"	Tenuis clicks become slack voiced nasal.
/ɓ/	/mb̥ʱ/	imbali "story" → iimbali "histories"	Implosive becomes slack voiced.
/f/, /s/, /ʃ/, /ɬ/, /x/ /v/, /z/, /ɮ/, /ɣ/	[ɱp̪f], /nts/, /ntʃ/, /ntɬ/, /ŋkx/ [ɱb̪̊vʱ], [nd̥zʱ], [nd̥ɮʱ], [ŋɡ̊ɣʱ]?	fuya "to breed" → iimfuyo "breeds"; usana "child" → iintsana "children"; shumayela "to preach" → iintshumayelo "sermons"; isihloko "title" → iintloko "heads"; vuma "approve" → iimvume "approvals"; zama "try" → iinzame "attempts"; ukudleka "wear and tear" → iindleko "costs"	Fricatives become affricates. Only phonemic, and thus reflected orthographically, for /nts/, /ntʃ/, /ntɬ/ and /ŋkx/.
/m/, /n/, /n̠ʲ/, /ŋ/ /ǀ̃/, /ǁ̃/, /ǃ̃/	/m/, /n/, /n̠ʲ/, /ŋ/ /ǀ̃/, /ǁ̃/, /ǃ̃/	umeyile "Mr. Mule (as a storybook character) → iimeyile "mules"; inoveli "novel" → iinoveli "novels"; ngena "bring in" → ingeniso "profit"; unyawo "foot" → iinyawo "feet"; ncokola "to chat" → incoko "conversation"; unxweme "sea shore" → iinxweme "sea shores"; nqula "worship" → iinqula "adam's apple"	No change when the following consonant is itself a nasal.

==== Consonant changes with palatalisation ====
Palatalisation is a change that affects labial consonants whenever they are immediately followed by /j/. While palatalisation occurred historically, it is still productive, as is shown by palatalization before the passive suffix /-w/ and before diminutive suffix /-ana/. This process can skip rightwards to non-local syllables (i.e. uku-sebenz-is-el + wa -> ukusetyenziselwa "be used for"), but does not affect morpheme-initial consonants (i.e. uku-bhal+wa -> ukubhalwa "to be written", instead of illicit *ukujalwa). The palatalization process only applies once, as evidenced by ukuphuphumisa+wa -> ukuphuphunyiswa "to be made to overflow", instead of the illicit alternative, *ukuphutshunyiswa.

List of consonant changes with palatalisation
Original consonant	Palatalised consonant	Examples
p	tʃ	uku- + kopa + -wa → ukukotshwa [ukukot͡ʃʷa] (to be copied)
pʰ	tʃʰ	uku- + phuph + -wa → ukuphutshwa [ukupʰut͡ʃʰʷa] (to be dreamt)
b̥ʱ	d̥ʒʱ	uku- + gab + wa → ukugajwa [ukugad̥ʒʱʷa] (to be thrown up)
ɓ	t̠ʲ	ubu- + -ala → utywala [ut̠ʲʷala] (alcohol); sebenz + -is + -el +wa -> setyenziselwa [set̠ʲenziselwa] (used for)
m	n̠ʲ	uku- + zam + -wa → zanywa [ukuzan̠ʲʷa] (to be tried on)
mp	ntʃ	uku- + krwemp + wa → ukukrwentshwa [ukukχʷ'ɛntʃʷa] (to be scratched)
mb̥ʱ	nd̥ʒʱ	uku + bamb + wa → ukubanjwa [ukuɓand̥ʒʱʷa] (to be caught)

== Morphology ==
In keeping with many other Bantu languages, Xhosa is an agglutinative language, with an array of prefixes and suffixes that are attached to root words. As in other Bantu languages, nouns in Xhosa are classified into morphological classes, or genders (15 in Xhosa), with different prefixes for both singular and plural. Various parts of speech that qualify a noun must agree with the noun according to its gender. Agreements usually reflect part of the original class with which the word agrees. The word order is subject–verb–object, like in English.

The verb is modified by affixes to mark subject, object, tense, aspect and mood. The various parts of the sentence must agree in both class and number.

=== Nouns ===
The Xhosa noun consists of two essential parts, the prefix and the stem. Using the prefixes, nouns can be grouped into noun classes, which are numbered consecutively, to ease comparison with other Bantu languages. Which they call 'amahlelo'

The following table gives an overview of Xhosa noun classes, arranged according to singular-plural pairs.

Class	Singular	Plural	Example
1/2	um-	aba-, abe-	umntu , abantu
1a/2a	u-	oo-	utitshala , ootitshala
3/4	um-	imi-	umthi , imithi
5/6	i-, ili-^{1}	ama-, ame-	ilitye , amatye
7/8	is(i)-^{2}	iz(i)-^{2}	isitya , izitya
9/10	iN-^{3}	iiN-^{3}, iziN-^{4}	inja , izinja
11/10	u-, ulu-^{1}, ulw-, ul-	iiN-^{3}, iziN-^{4}	uluthi
14	ubu-, ub-, uty-		ubuthi
15	uku-		ukutya

^{1} Before monosyllabic stems, e.g. iliso (eye), uluhlu (list).

^{2} is- and iz- replace isi- and izi- respectively before stems beginning with a vowel, e.g. isandla/izandla (hand/hands).

^{3} The placeholder N in the prefixes iN- and iiN- is a nasal consonant which assimilates in place to the following consonant (producing an im- before vowels), but is typically absent in loanwords.

^{4} Before monosyllabic stems in some words.

=== Verbs ===
Verbs use the following prefixes for the subject and object:

Person/ Class	Subject	Object
1st sing.	ndi-	-ndi-
2nd sing.	u-	-ku-
1st plur.	si-	-si-
2nd plur.	ni-	-ni-
1	u-	-m-
2	ba-	-ba-
3	u-	-wu-
4	i-	-yi-
5	li-	-li-
6	a-	-wa-
7	si-	-si-
8	zi-	-zi-
9	i-	-yi-
10	zi-	-zi-
11	lu-	-lu-
14	bu-	-bu-
15	ku-	-ku-
reflexive	—	-zi-

=== Examples ===
ukudlala – to play
ukubona – to see
umntwana – a child
abantwana – children

umntwana uyadlala – the child is playing
abantwana bayadlala – the children are playing

indoda – a man
amadoda – men

indoda iyambona umntwana – the man sees the child
amadoda ayababona abantwana – the men see the children

== Sample phrases and text ==
The following is a list of phrases that can be used when one visits a region whose primary language is Xhosa:

Xhosa	English
Molo	Hello
Molweni	hello, to a group of people
Unjani?	how are you?
Ninjani?	How are you?, to a group of people
Ndiphilile	I'm okay
Siphilile	We're okay
Ndiyabulela (kakhulu)	Thank you (a lot)
Enkosi (kakhulu)	Thanks (a lot)
Ngubani igama lakho?	What is your name?
Igama lam ngu....	My name is....
Ngubani ixesha?	What is the time?
Ndingakunceda?	Can I help you?
Hamba kakuhle	Goodbye/go well/safe travels
Nihambe kakuhle	Goodbye/go well/safe travels (said to a group of people)
Ewe	Yes
Hayi	No
Andiyazi	I don't know
Uyakwazi ukuthetha isiNgesi?	Can you speak English?
Ndisaqala ukufunda isiXhosa	I've just started learning Xhosa
Uthetha ukuthini?	What do you mean?
Ndicela ukuya ngasese?	May I please go to the bathroom?
Ndiyakuthanda	I love you
Uxolo	Sorry
Usapho	Family
Thetha	Talk/speak

== Months of the year in Xhosa ==
=== Days of the week ===
isiXhosa	English
Mvulo	Monday
Lwesibini	Tuesday
Lwesithathu	Wednesday
Lwesine	Thursday
Lwesihlanu	Friday
Mgqibelo	Saturday
Cawa	Sunday

== Counting in Xhosa ==
=== Counting from 1 to 10 ===
The digital numerical counting etiquette on the fingers begins with the little finger of the left hand to the left thumb and then continues with the right-hand thumb towards the right little finger. Starting with a closed left hand, each finger is extended with each subsequent number from one to five. Once the left hand is open, then counting continues on the right hand with each finger opening in turn.

IsiXhosa	English
Nye	One
Mbini	Two
Ntathu	Three
Ne	Four
Ntlanu	Five
Ntandathu	Six
Sixhenxe	Seven
Sibhozo	Eight
Lithoba	Nine
Lishumi	Ten
Likhulu	Hundred
Liwaka	Thousand
Sisigidi	Million

== History ==
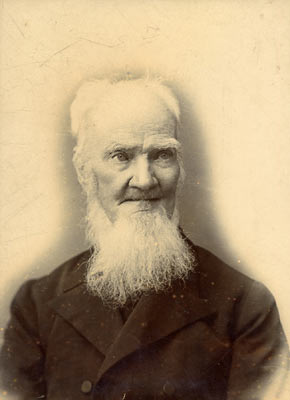
English missionary Henry Hare Dugmore helped translate the Bible into Xhosa in 1859

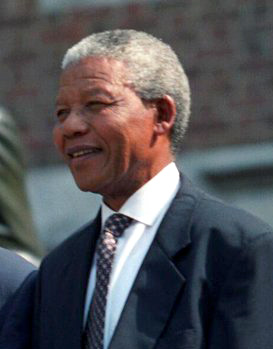
Nelson Mandela was a Xhosa and was a member of the royal family of the Thembu tribe

Xhosa-speaking people have inhabited coastal regions of southeastern Africa since before the 16th century. They refer to themselves as the amaXhosa and their language as isiXhosa. Ancestors of the Xhosa migrated to the east coast of Africa and came across Khoisan-speaking people; "as a result of this contact, the Xhosa people borrowed some Khoisan words along with their pronunciation, for instance, the click sounds of the Khoisan languages". The Bantu ancestor of Xhosa did not have clicks, which attests to a strong historical contact with a Khoisan language that did. An estimated 15% of Xhosa vocabulary is of Khoisan origin. Unlike many Khoisan languages, which have four places of click articulation, Xhosa has only three, missing the palatal clicks. However, and unusually for an Nguni language, Xhosa also has a full set of palatal pulmonic consonants. This inventory is similar to many of the Kalahari Khoe languages, especially in the east, which have a full set of palatal pulmonic consonants, and several of which have lost their palatal clicks as well.

John Bennie was a Scottish Presbyterian missionary and early Xhosa linguist. Bennie, along with John Ross (another missionary), set up a printing press in the Tyhume Valley and the first printed works in Xhosa came out in 1823 from the Lovedale Press in the Alice region of the Eastern Cape. But, as with any language, Xhosa had a rich history of oral traditions from which the society taught, informed, and entertained one another. The first Bible translation was in 1859, produced in part by Henry Hare Dugmore.

== Role in modern society ==
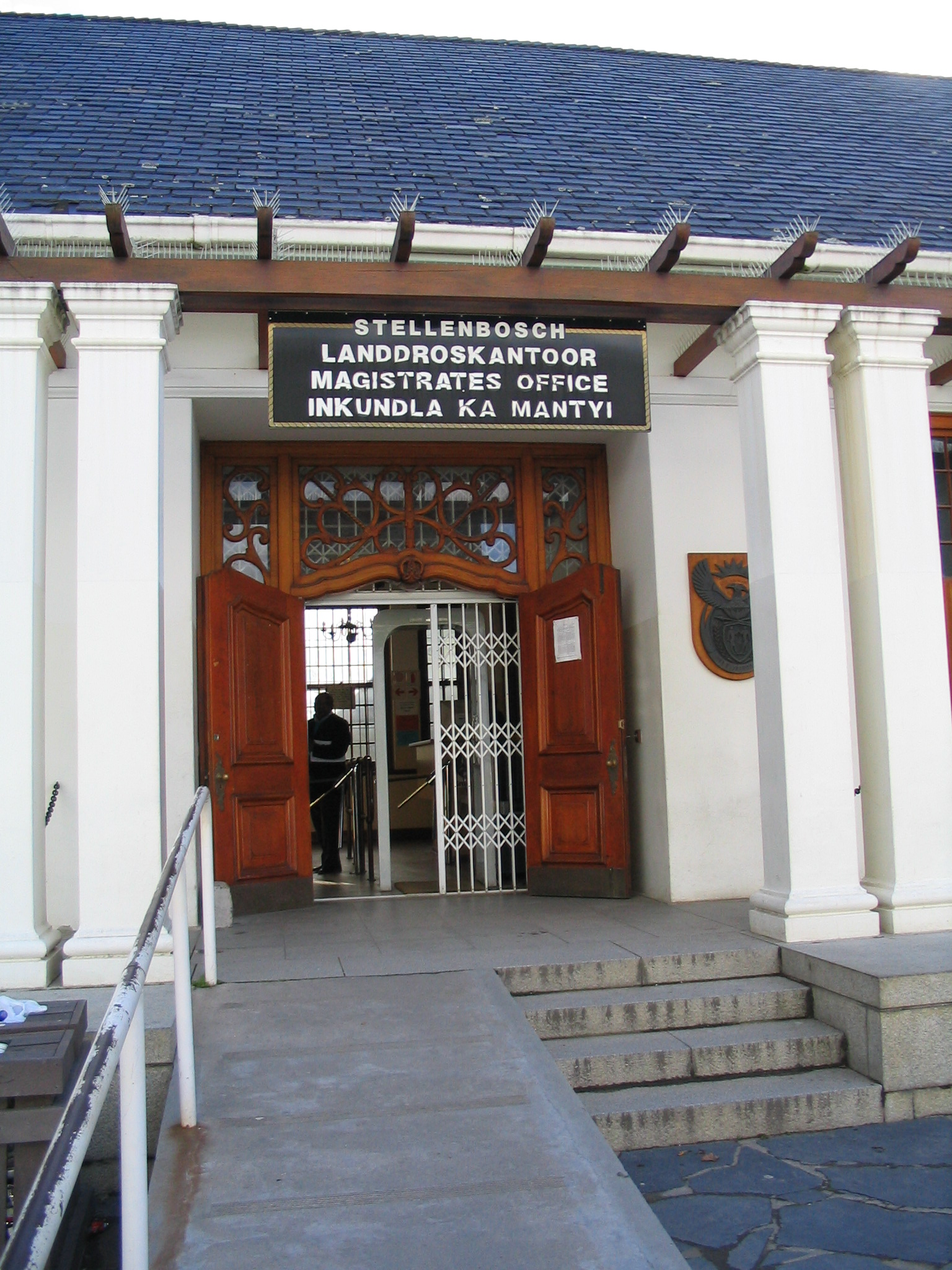
Trilingual government building sign in Afrikaans, English and Xhosa; Stellenbosch, South Africa.

The role of indigenous languages in South Africa is complex and ambiguous. Their use in education has been governed by legislation, beginning with the Bantu Education Act, 1953.

At present, Xhosa is used as the main language of instruction in many primary schools and some secondary schools, but is largely replaced by English after the early primary grades, even in schools mainly serving Xhosa-speaking communities. The language is also studied as a subject in such schools.

The language of instruction at universities in South Africa is English (or Afrikaans, to a diminishing extent), while Xhosa is taught as a subject, both for native and for non-native speakers.

Literary works, including prose and poetry, are available in Xhosa, as are newspapers and magazines. The South African Broadcasting Corporation broadcasts in Xhosa on both radio (on Umhlobo Wenene FM) and television, and films, plays and music are also produced in the language. The best-known performer of Xhosa songs outside South Africa was Miriam Makeba, whose Click Song #1 (Xhosa Qongqothwane) and "Click Song #2" (Baxabene Ooxam) are known for their large number of click sounds.

In 1996, the literacy rate for first-language Xhosa speakers was estimated at 50%.

=== Anthem ===
Nkosi Sikelel' iAfrika is part of the national anthem of South Africa, national anthem of Tanzania and Zambia, and the former anthem of Zimbabwe and Namibia. It is a hymn written in Xhosa by Enoch Sontonga in 1897. The single original stanza was:

Nkosi, sikelel' iAfrika
Maluphakanyis' uphondo lwayo,
Yizwa imithandazo yethu,
Nkosi sikelela, thina lusapho lwayo.

Translation:

God bless Africa
Raise high her glory
Hear our prayers
God bless us, we her children

Additional stanzas were written later by Sontonga and other writers, and the original verse was translated into Sotho and Afrikaans, as well as English.

== In popular culture ==
In The Lion King, its reboot and the musical, Rafiki, the sagely mandrill chants in Xhosa.

Nelson Mandela's Xhosa initiation ceremony is featured in the 2013 film Mandela: Long Walk to Freedom.

In the Marvel Cinematic Universe films Captain America: Civil War, Black Panther, Avengers: Infinity War, Avengers: Endgame, Black Panther: Wakanda Forever, and the TV show The Falcon and the Winter Soldier, the language spoken in the fictional African nation of Wakanda is Xhosa. This came about because South African actor John Kani, a native of the Eastern Cape province who plays Wakandan King T'Chaka, speaks Xhosa and suggested that the directors of the fictional Civil War incorporate a dialogue in the language. For Black Panther, director Ryan Coogler "wanted to make it a priority to use Xhosa as much as possible" in the script, and provided dialect coaches for the film's actors.

== See also ==
- I'solezwe lesiXhosa, the first Xhosa-language newspaper
- U-Carmen eKhayelitsha, a 2005 Xhosa film adaptation of Bizet's Carmen
- Xhosa calendar

== Bibliography ==
- Boyce, William B. (1834). A Grammar of the Kafir Language. Graham's Town: Wesleyan Methodist Missionary Society.
- Davis, William J. (1872). A Grammar of the Kaffir Language. London: Printed for the Wesleyan missionary Society.
- Crawshaw, C. J. (1888). A First Kafir Course. Lovedale: Missionary Press.
- McLaren, J. (1955). Welsh, G. H. (ed.). A Xhosa Grammar: Revised and rewritten in the New Orthography (4th ed.). Cape Town: Longmans, Green and Co.
- Mncube, F. S. M. (1957). Xhosa Manual. Johannesburg: Juta & Company.
- Fischer, Arnold (1985). English-Xhosa Dictionary. Cape Town: Oxford University Press. ISBN 0195702905.
- Einhorn, E.; Siyengo, L. (1990). Xhosa: a concise manual. Cape Town : Johannesburg: Faircape Books ; Thorold's Africana Books [distributor]. ISBN 9780798507509.
- Kaschula, Russell (1997). Xhosa (1st ed.). New York: Rosen Publishing Group. ISBN 978-0-8239-2013-6.
- Kirsch, Beverley; Skorge, Silvia (2010). Complete Xhosa. London: Teach Yourself. ISBN 9780071759625.
- Motinyane-Masoko, Mantoa; Mawadza, Aquilina (2017). Xhosa-English/English-Xhosa dictionary & phrasebook. New York: Hippocrene Books, Inc. ISBN 9780781813631.
