= Sena language =

Bantu language of central Mozambique

Sena
- Native to: Mozambique, Malawi, Zimbabwe
- Ethnicity: Sena
- Native speakers: 2,869,000 (2017–2020)
- Language family: Niger–Congo?: Atlantic–Congo; Benue–Congo; Southern Bantoid; Bantu; Nyasa; Sena (N40) ?; Sena
- Dialects: Rue (Barwe); Podzo
- Writing system: Latin script Mwangwego script

Official status
- Official language in: Zimbabwe (as 'Chibarwe')
- Recognised minority language in: Malawi

Language codes
- ISO 639-3: Variously: seh – Mozambiquean Sena swk – Malawian Sena bwg – Barwe
- Glottolog: nucl1396 Nuclear Sena mala1475 Malawi Sena barw1243 Barwe
- Guthrie code: N.44,441 (N.45,46)
- Linguasphere: 99-AUS-xi; also 99-AUS-xj (Chi-Rue), 99-AUS-xk (Gombe), 99-AUS-xl (Sangwe), & 99-AUS-xm (Chi-Podzo)

A speaker of Barwe, a dialect of the Sena language. Portuguese is also spoken in this video.

Sena is a Bantu language spoken in the four provinces of central Mozambique (Zambezi valley): Tete, Sofala, Zambezia and Manica. There were an estimated 900,000 native Sena speakers in Mozambique in 1997, with at least 1.5 million if including those who speak it as a second language. It is one of the Nyasa languages.

Sena is spoken in several dialects, of which Rue (also called Barwe or Cibalke) and Podzo are divergent. The Sena of Malawi may be a distinct language. Barwe (Chibarwe) has official recognition in Zimbabwe.

Some remarks on Sena tenses can be found in Funnell (2004), Barnes & Funnell (2005) and in Kiso (2012).

== Phonology ==
=== Vowels ===
	Front	Central	Back
Close	i		u
Mid	e		o
Open		a	

=== Consonants ===
		Labial	Alveolar		Palato- alveolar	Palatal	Velar	Glottal
		Labial	plain	lab.	Palato- alveolar	Palatal	Velar	Glottal
Nasal		m	n			ɲ	ŋ	
Stop	voiceless	p	t				k	
Stop	aspirated	pʰ	tʰ				kʰ	
Stop	voiced	b	d				ɡ	
Stop	implosive	ɓ	ɗ			(ɗʲ)		
Affricate	voiceless	p͡f	t͡s	p͡s	t͡ʃ			
Affricate	voiced	b͡v	d͡z	b͡z	d͡ʒ			
Affricate	aspirated				t͡ʃʰ			
Fricative	voiceless	f	s	sʷ	ʃ			h
Fricative	voiced	v	z	zʷ	ʒ			
Approximant			l			j	w	
Trill			r					

- Labialized sounds /sʷ, zʷ/ can also be heard as retroflex [ʂ, ʐ] among different speakers.
- /ɗ/ is heard as palatalized [ɗʲ] when followed by a /j/.
- The following sounds occur as prenasalized when after a homorganic nasal; [ᵐp, ᶬf, ᶬp͡f, ⁿt, ⁿs, ᶮt͡ʃ, ᵑk], [ᵐb, ᵐɓ, ᶬv, ᶬb͡v, ⁿd, ⁿɗ, ⁿz, ᶮd͡ʒ, ᵑɡ].
