= National anthem of Iraq =

Mawṭinī
English: "My Homeland"
- Arabic: موطني
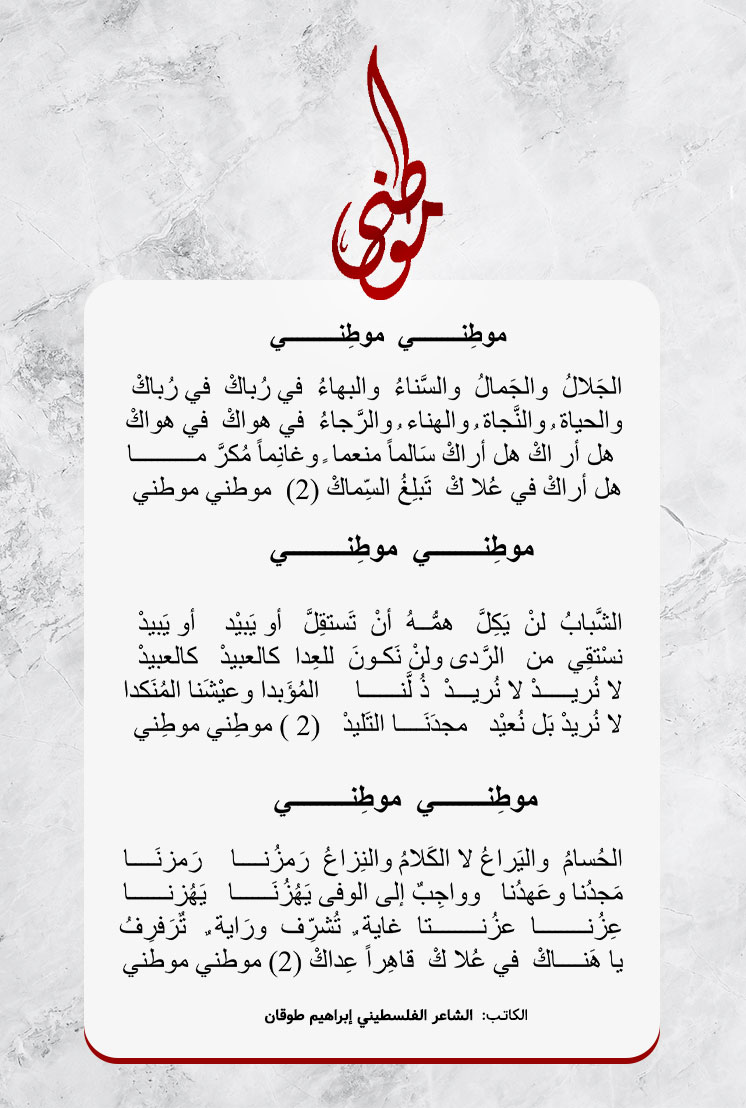
- Arabic lyrics of Mawtini
- National anthem of Iraq
- Lyrics: Ibrahim Tuqan, 1934
- Music: Mohammed Flayfel, 1934
- Adopted: 2004
- Preceded by: Ardulfurataini

Since 2004, Iraq has adopted Mawtini, an Arabic national poem, to serve as the national anthem of Iraq (Arabic: النشيد الوطني العراقي). The poem was adopted by Coalition Provisional Authority Chairman Paul Bremer after the US invasion of Iraq in 2003 to replace the former one of Ardulfurataini.

== History ==
Since the establishment of the modern state of Iraq in 1921 AD and with every major change in the regime, the Iraqi national anthem has also been subject to change. With the succession of different regimes, Iraq has had five national anthems in a period of less than one century.

=== The royal era ===
After the formation of the Iraqi state and the installation of Faisal I as king of the emerging state, the Hashemite Kingdom of Iraq had to have royal music, similar to the advanced countries of the world. In fact, in 1924, a competition was announced to compose the first royal anthem, and a cash prize was allocated to the winner of that competition. A number of foreign musicians participated, and the English officer, Major J.R. Murray, won and composed a piece of music on the rhythm of a march on four. This anthem was played for the first time by the Royal Guard Choir in the National Assembly, the Royal Court, and the headquarters of the Ministry of Defense. It was shown on cinema screens before and after the films, with the image of the king appearing and the Iraqi flag fluttering behind his image. This continued until the July Revolution of 1958. The royal anthem was just a melody without words. One of the poets tried to add words to the melody, but in an unofficial manner, so that it was chanted in front of King Faisal.

=== The first republican era ===
After the military coup in the July 14 Revolution of 1958 led by Abdul Karim Qasim, it was necessary to change the royal anthem and transform it into a republican anthem. This work was done by the Iraqi Assyrian musician Louis Zanbaqa, a graduate of the Wind Music Department at the Institute of Fine Arts in the mid-fifties. He continued his musical studies in the Austrian capital (Vienna). When the July 14 Revolution took place, he took the initiative there to compose a melody for the republican anthem, write it down and distribute it to all sections (instruments) of the wind music band and record it by an Austrian music band. He presented it accompanied by a letter from him to the leader Abdul Karim Qasim, the leader of the revolution, through the Iraqi embassy in Vienna, explaining the ideas and contents he relied on in formulating the melody, which is in the form of a march. Thus, it was decided to adopt it as the national anthem of the Republic of Iraq until 1963. It is worth noting that the republican anthem in this era was also a melody without words and was called “My Homeland,” which is different from the current national anthem but bears the same name. This musician is considered the only Iraqi who composed the melody for the Iraqi national anthem to this day.

=== 1963 - 1981 ===
After the coup against Abdul Karim Qasim and the rise of the Baath Party to power on February 8, 1963, a new national anthem was adopted, which was “Wallah Zaman Ya Silahi” (It’s Been a Long Time, My Weapon), composed by the Egyptian composer Kamal al-Tawil and written by the Egyptian poet Salah Jahin. It was sung by Umm Kulthum in 1956 and was adopted as the national anthem of the Arab Republic of Egypt for the period from 1960 to 1979, meaning that Iraq and Egypt had the same national anthem.

=== Saddam Hussein ===
After Saddam Hussein came to power, he saw that it was necessary to have a national anthem specific to Iraq and not follow the Egyptian national anthem that had been in use in the previous decade. A competition was held in the Department of Musical Arts in the Iraqi Ministry of Information at the time to issue a new national anthem. The department recorded all the works and a specialized committee heard them and evaluated them. The results favored the participation of two officers from the military music, Abdul Salam Jamil Franso and Abdul Razzaq Al-Azzawi, due to their professional and artistic expertise in this type of music. However, what happened was that a republican decree was issued to adopt an anthem with lyrics by the Iraqi poet Shafiq Al-Kamali and music by the Lebanese composer Walid Gholmieh to be the national anthem of the Republic of Iraq in 1981.

After a number of criticisms of the tune, the director of the Iraqi military music and his assistant were sent to England to rework the tune to suit the artistic structure of the military music bands that usually perform the national anthem. The tune of the anthem was recorded by a British band. It is noteworthy that in the late days of Saddam Hussein's rule, attempts were announced to change the national anthem. A number of these anthems were broadcast on the Iraqi, Al-Shabab and Iraqi satellite channels, and viewers were asked to vote on them, but it is not known why none of them were approved. Among the participants was the musician Kazem El Saher with the poem "Peace Be Upon You", whose lyrics were written by Asaad Al-Ghariri.

=== 2003 ===
After the American invasion of Iraq in 2003, Mawtini was adopted as the official national anthem of the Republic of Iraq. The anthem is a popular national Arabic poem written by the Palestinian poet Ibrahim Touqan in 1934 and was composed by Mohammed Fleifel. This anthem has been adopted by successive Iraqi governments since 2003.

==== Peace on the Hills of Iraq ====
Peace on the Hills of Iraq is a poem by the Iraqi poet Muhammad Mahdi al-Jawahiri, written in 1947. It was adopted as the national anthem of the Republic of Iraq instead of Mawtini by the Iraqi Council of Representatives on July 12, 2012, but it was not announced that it would be adopted as a new anthem.

== See also ==
- Egyptian national anthem
- Royal Jordanian Anthem

== Sources ==
- Podeh, Elie (2022). "Anthems in the Arab world: A hybrid national symbol". Nations and Nationalism. 28 (4): 1379–1394. doi:10.1111/nana.12803. ISSN 1354-5078.
