= Ja'afar Tuqan =

Palestinian-Jordanian architect (1938–2014)

- جعفر طوقان
- Born: January 19, 1938; Jerusalem, Mandatory Palestine
- Died: November 25, 2014 (aged 76); Amman, Jordan
- Occupation: Architect

Ja'afar Tuqan (Note: Also romanized as Jafar Tukan.) (Arabic: جعفر طوقان, romanized: Jaʿfar Ṭūqān; 19 January 1938 – 25 November 2014) was a Palestinian-Jordanian architect.

== Life and career ==
=== Early life ===
Ja'afar Tuqan was born in 1938 in Jerusalem, Mandatory Palestine. He was the son of the Palestinian poet Ibrahim Tuqan, writer of the poem Mawtini, the current national anthem of Iraq. He was also the nephew of both the Jordanian Prime Minister Ahmad Toukan and the Palestinian poet Fadwa Tuqan and thus a member of the Tuqan family.

Tuqan graduated from the American University of Beirut in 1960. After graduating from AUB, he worked as a design architect at the Jordanian Ministry of Public Works before joining Dar al-Handasah Consulting Engineers at its head office in Beirut.

In 1968, he established a private practice in Beirut. In 1973, formed the partnership Rais and Tukan Architects, which later became Jafar Tukan and Partners Architects and Engineers. The practice was later relocated to Amman, Jordan following the Lebanese Civil war during the mid-1970s. In 2003, Jafar Tukan and Partners Architects and Engineers merged with the Jordanian firm Consolidated Consultants for Engineering and the Environment.

=== Career ===
Tuqan designed the Municipality of Amman in Ras al Ayn in association with Rasem Badran, and he belonged to several committees including that of the National Gallery. Ja'afar Tuqan also designed the Royal Automobile Museum, The Jordan Museum, the Yasser Arafat Museum in Ramallah, the Mahmoud Darwish Museum in Ramallah, the Central Bank of Jordan building and the Jordan Gate Towers. He received the Aga Khan Award for Architecture for the SOS Children's Village in Aqaba, Jordan, which he designed and completed in 1991.

Tuqan served on the Board of Trustees of the Palestinian Art Court – Al Hoash.

=== Death ===
Tuqan died on 25 November 2014 in Amman, Jordan.
