= Biladi, Biladi, Biladi =

National anthem of Egypt

Bilādī, bilādī, bilādī
English: My homeland, my homeland, my homeland
- بلادي بلادي بلادي
- National anthem of Egypt
- Also known as: بلادي بلادي (English: My Country, My Country)
- Lyrics: Muhammad Yunis al-Qady, 1878
- Music: Sayed Darwish, 1923
- Adopted: 1923; 1952 (unofficial); 1979 (official)
- Preceded by: "Wallāh Zamān, Yā Silāḥī"

Audio sample
- U.S. Navy Band instrumental version (chorus and one verse) in F major: file; help

"Bilādī, Bilādī, Bilādī" (Arabic: بلادي بلادي بلادي [bɪˈlæːdiː bɪˈlæːdiː bɪˈlæːdiː]; transl. 'My Homeland, My Homeland, My Homeland') is the national anthem of Egypt, composed by Sayed Darwish and written by Muhammad Yunis al-Qady. It was adopted in 1979.

Egypt's first national anthem dates back to 1869 when a royal anthem was composed to honor the monarch. It is unclear how long this anthem was in use. Although the monarchy was deposed in 1952, the anthem was used as part of the anthem of the United Arab Republic with Syria in 1958.

The modern Egyptian state historically had five anthems.

"Bilady, Bilady, Bilady" is the current Egyptian national anthem. It was written by Mohamed Younis El-Qadi and composed by Sayed Darwish. It is derived from the words of Mustafa Kamel in one of his most famous speeches in 1907, in which he said: "My Country, my Country, for you is my love and my heart. for you is my life and my existence, for you is my blood, for you is my mind and my tongue, for you is my heart and my soul, for you are life.. and there is no life except with you, O Egypt." It was officially adopted in 1979, and was redistributed by the Egyptian musician Mohamed Abdel Wahab at the direction of the President Anwar El-Sadat.

== History ==
The lyrics were written by Mohammed Younis El Qady. Sayed Darwish composed the music and maintained close ties with early leaders of the national movement for independence in Egypt, such as Mustafa Kamel. The chorus derived from one of Kamel's most famous Egyptian nationalist speeches.

=== Salam Affandina (1871–1923) ===
Egypt had its first the national anthem during the reign of Khedive Ismail. It was known as the "Khedive's Special Salute". It was instrumental and had no official lyrics. The national anthem of Egypt was played at the opening of the Suez Canal during Khedive Ismail's reception of the kings of the world. It was adopted as the first national anthem after this visit in 1871. Multiple origins of the melody had been proposed (including Giuseppe Verdi, the author of opera "Aida", and Turkish or Egyptian composers), but the most likely author is Giuiseppe Pugioli, an Italian cornetist, who visited Egypt to perform the Verdi's opera and remained in Egypt. The musical score of the anthem is near-identical to Pugioli's work "l'Affendina". While used internationally, the melody without words did not become popular inside Egypt, and multiple attempts were made to rectify the situation, triggered by the 1919 Egyptian revolution. Ahmad Shawqi won a competition held in 1920 to produce lyrics for the anthem, yet his entry failed to gain traction with the bureaucracy.

=== Eslami ya Misr (1923-1936) ===
The anthem "Eslami ya Misr", written by Mustafa Sadiq Al-Rafei and composed by Safar Ali, became the national anthem from 1923 to 1936. The anthem is currently used as the anthem of the Police College in Egypt.

=== Salam Affandina: Egyptian Royal Anthem (1936–1953) ===
King Farouk restored the Egyptian royal anthem composed by Puigliani when he ascended the throne in 1936 and continued until 1953.

=== Salam Affandina: Egyptian Republican Anthem (1953–1958) ===
With the end of the monarchy in 1953 and the outbreak of the Free Officers Revolution, the anthem was not changed. But its name changed to be called the Egyptian Republican anthem instead of the Egyptian Royal anthem because of the abolition of the monarchy.

=== Walla Zaman Ya Selahy (1960–1979) ===
In 1960, Republican Decree No. 143 was issued to adopt a new national anthem, which was based on Kamal El-Tawil's melody for the anthem "Wallah Zaman Ya Silahi" with lyrics by Salah Jahin for Umm Kulthum. This anthem gained great popularity in 1956 during the Tripartite Aggression on Egypt. There were no lyrics accompanying the melody, which is why it was referred to as the "Al-Salam" (Salute) rather than "Al-Nasheed" (Anthem).

During the period in which the tune "Wallah Zaman Ya Selahy" was used as the national anthem of Egypt, two amendments were made to it: the first by Republican Decree No. 1854 of 1974, which limited the playing of the first part of it only, and the second by Republican Decree No. 1158 of 1975, which returned to playing the entire national anthem as it had been since 1960.

"Wallah Zaman Ya Selahy" remained the national anthem until 1979. It was also used as a national anthem by Iraq from 1963 to 1981, which aspired to form a unified Arab state from Egypt and Iraq, and it was also used as the anthem of the United Arab Republic between 1958 and 1960.

=== Bilady, Bilady, Bilady (1979–present) ===
In 1979, Republican Decree No. 149 was issued amending the national anthem of the Arab Republic of Egypt to the anthem "Bilady, Bilady, Bilady" written by Sheikh Younis Al-Qadi (influenced by the words of Mustafa Kamel), composed by Sayed Darwish, and redistributed by the Egyptian musician Mohamed Abdel Wahab. Then, in December 1982, Republican Decree No. 590 was issued, which stipulated in its first article that:

It is to be observed that the lyrics of the first verse of the anthem 'Biladi Biladi' are to accompany the musical score in all popular and national celebrations. The instrumental national anthem is to be limited to playing the musical score without lyrics when welcoming presidents and foreign delegations, as well as in other instances requiring its performance alongside the instrumental anthem of a foreign country

== Lyrics ==
=== Official lyrics ===
Arabic original

كورال:
بِلَادِي بِلَادِي بِلَادِي
لَكِ حُبِّي وَفُؤَادِي
بِلَادِي بِلَادِي بِلَادِي
لَكِ حُبِّي وَفُؤَادِي

١
مَصْرِ يَا أُمِّ الْبِلَادْ
أَنْتِ غَايَتِي وَالْمُرَادْ
وَعَلَى كُلِّ الْعِبَادْ
كَمْ لِنِيلِكْ مِنْ أَيَادِي

كورال

٢
مَصْرِ أَنْتِ أَغْلَى دُرَّة
فُوقْ جَبِينِ الدَّهْرِ غُرَّة
يَا بِلَادِي عِيشِي حُرَّة
وَاسْلَمِي رَغْمَ الْأَعَادِي

كورال

٣
مَصْرِ أَوْلَادِكْ كِرَامْ
أَوْفِيَاء يَرْعُوا الزِّمَامْ
نَحْنُ حَرْبٌ وَسَلَامْ
وَفِدَاكِي يَا بِلَادِي

كورال

Romanization of Arabic

Kūrāl:
Bilādī, bilādī, bilādī
Laki ḥubbī wa-fūʾādī
Bilādī, bilādī, bilādī
Laki ḥubbī wa-fūʾādī

I
Maṣri yā ʾummi l-bilād
ʾĀnti ğāyatī wa-l-murād
Wa-ʿalā kulli l-ʿabād
Kam li-Nīlik min ʾāyādī

Kūrāl

II
Maṣri ʾanti ʾāğlā durrah
Fawqi jibīni d-dahr ğurrah
Yā bilādī ʿīšī ḥurrah
Wa-slamī rağma l-ʾaʿādī

Kūrāl

III
Maṣri ʾawlādik kirām
ʾAwfiyāʾ yarʿū z-zimām
Naḥnu ḥarbun wa-salām
Wa-fidākī yā bilādī.

Kūrāl

IPA transcription (Note: See Help:IPA/Arabic.)

[kuː.rɑːl]
[bɪ.læː.diː bɪ.læː.diː bɪ.læː.diː]
[læ.kɪ ħʊb.biː wɑ.fu.ʔæː.diː]
[bɪ.læː.diː bɪ.læː.diː bɪ.læː.diː]
[læ.kɪ ħʊb.biː wɑ.fu.ʔæː.diː]

1
[mɑsˤr jæː ʔʊm.mɪ‿l.bɪ.læːd]
[ʔæn.tɪ ɣɑː.jæ.tiː wɑ‿l.mʊ.rɑːd]
[wɑ ʕɑ.læː kʊl.lɪ‿l.ʕɪ.bæːd]
[kæm lɪ niːlɪk(.ɪ) mɪn ʔæ.jæː.diː]

[kuː.rɑːl]

2
[mɑsˤ.rɪ ʔæn.ti ʔæɣ.læː dʊr.rɑ]
[fɑw.qɪː (ɡɪ.)biːnɪ‿d.dɑh.ri ɣʊr.rɑ]
[jæː bɪ.læː.diː ʕɪː.ʃɪː ħʊr.rɑ]
[wæ‿s.læ.miː rɑɣ.mæ‿l.ʔæ.ʕæː.diː]

[kuː.rɑːl]

3
[mɑsˤ.rɪ ʔɑw.læː.dɪk kɪ.rɑːm]
[ʔɑw.fɪ.jæːʔ jær.ʕʊː‿z.zɪ.mæːm]
[nɑħ.nʊ ħɑr.bʊn wæ sæ.læːm]
[wæ fɪ.dæː.kiː jæː bɪ.læː.diː]

[kuː.raːl]

English translation

Chorus:
My homeland, my homeland, my homeland
You have my love and my heart.
My homeland, my homeland, my homeland
You have my love and my heart.

I
Egypt! O mother of all countries,
You are my hope and my ambition,
And above all people,
Your Nile has countless graces!

Chorus

II
Egypt! Most precious gem,
A blaze on the brow of eternity!
O my homeland, be for ever free,
Safe from every enemy!

Chorus

III
Egypt, noble are your children.
Loyal, and guardians of the reins.
Be we at war or peace
We will sacrifice ourselves for you, my homeland.

Chorus

=== Unofficial lyrics ===
An unofficial Coptic version of the anthem, though not codified in law, is widely circulated online and has gained popularity through various digital platforms.

Coptic version
(chorus and first verse only)

Chorus:
Ⲧⲁⲃⲁⲕⲓ, ⲧⲁⲃⲁⲕⲓ, ⲧⲁⲃⲁⲕⲓ
Ⲡ̀ϭⲟⲓⲥ ⲥ̀ⲙⲟⲩ ⲧⲉⲛ ⲃⲁⲕⲓ
Ⲧⲁⲃⲁⲕⲓ, ⲧⲁⲃⲁⲕⲓ, ⲧⲁⲃⲁⲕⲓ
Ⲡ̀ϭⲟⲓⲥ ⲥ̀ⲙⲟⲩ ⲧⲉⲛ ⲃⲁⲕⲓ

ⲁ
Ⲭⲏⲙⲓ ⲛ̀ⲑⲟ ⲡⲉ ⲡⲉⲛ ⲱⲛϧ
Ⲛⲉⲛ ⲓⲟϯ ⲛ̀ϧⲏⲧ ⲁⲩ ⲱⲛϧ
Ⲁ̀ⲛⲟⲛ ϩⲱⲛ ⲙⲁⲣⲉⲛ ⲧⲱⲃϩ
Ⲡ̀ϭⲟⲓⲥ ⲥ̀ⲙⲟⲩ ⲧⲉⲛ ⲃⲁⲕⲓ

Romanization of Coptic
(chorus and first verse only)

Chorus:
Tabaki, tabaki, tabaki,
Epshois esmou tən baki.
Tabaki, tabaki, tabaki,
Epshois esmou tən baki.

I
Khêmi entho pə pən ônx
Nən ioti enxêt au ônx
Anon hôn marən tôbh
Epshois esmou tən baki

IPA transcription (Note: See Help:IPA and Coptic alphabet § Letters.)
(chorus and first verse only)

[tɐ.vɐ.ki tɐ.vɐ.ki tɐ.vɐ.ki]
[ep.t͡ʃo̞ɪs es.mu te̞n vɐ.ki]
[tɐ.vɐ.ki tɐ.vɐ.ki tɐ.vɐ.ki]
[ep.t͡ʃo̞ɪs es.mu te̞n vɐ.ki]

1
[kiː.m.i en.θo̞ pe̞ pe̞n o̞ːn(ə)x]
[ne̞n jo̞.ti en.xiːt ɐu o̞ːn(ə)x]
[eɐ̯.no̞n ho̞ːn mɐ.ɾe̞n to̞ː.v(ə)h]
[ep.t͡ʃo̞ɪs es.mu te̞n vɐ.ki]

English translation
(chorus and first verse only)

Chorus:
My homeland, my homeland, my homeland,
God bless our homeland.
My homeland, my homeland, my homeland,
God bless our homeland.

I
Egypt you are our life
Our ancestors lived in you
We pray (we also, let's pray)
God bless our homeland

== See also ==
- List of national anthems
- "Mawtini"
- National anthem of Iraq
