= National symbols of Egypt =

The national symbols of Egypt consist of official and unofficial flags, icons and cultural expressions that are emblematic, representative or otherwise characteristic of Egypt and of its culture.

== Symbols ==
Title	Name of Symbol	Picture
National flag	Flag of Egypt	Flag of Egypt
Coat of arms	Coat of arms of Egypt	Egypt Coat of Arms
National anthem	Bilady, Bilady, Bilady	Bilady, Bilady, Bilady
National flower	Nymphaea lotus	
National tree	Doum palm (Hyphaene thebaica)	Hyphaene thebaica
National bird	Steppe ("Saladin") eagle (Aquila nipalensis)	Steppe Eagle
National symbol	Ankh	
National symbol	Scarab beetle	

== Flag of Egypt ==
The National flag of Egypt was adopted on October 4th, 1984. It consists of three colors displayed horizontally with red, white, and black (listed top to bottom) with the Eagle of Saladin in the center holding a scroll with Kufic script translating to "Arab Republic of Egypt."

== Coat of Arms ==
The Egyptian Coat of Arms shows the Saladin Eagle, also known as the Steppe Eagle, Republican Eagle or Egyptian Golden Eagle. The Eagle's breast is covered with a shield bearing the colors of the flag of Egypt in a vertical orientation rather than horizontal. Below this is the Kufic script translating to the "Arab Republic of Egypt."

== Egyptian (Nymphaea) Lotus ==
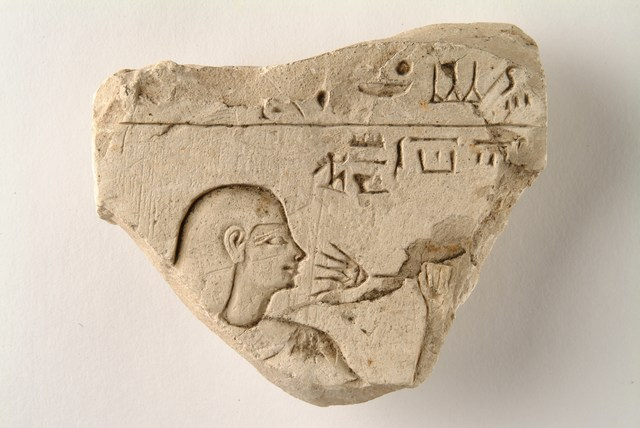
Stone fragment with lotus flower

The varying representations of the Nymphaea Lotus throughout the Fertile Crescent, Egypt & the Nile give evidence to cultural contact between the areas beginning as early as the first millennia BCE. The flower's mention is found in some of Egypt's earliest written records, including mythical references to the god of creation, Atum or Nefer-Atum, emerging from the center of the Nile, as well as many mortuary chambers of the Old Kingdom. The lotus flower is shown in many Egyptian hieroglyphs often in connection to the ankh emblem & scarab beetle, which each represent eternal life & immortality.

== Steppe "Saladin" Eagle ==
The Steppe Eagle bears many names within Egyptian history. The most prominent being the Eagle of Saladin, as it represents Arab nationalism and is a symbol of power. It is believed to be derived from the probable flag/emblem of the first Sultan of Egypt and Syria, Saladin. The Eagle of Saladin remains a potent symbol for Arab unity, as it is used by many countries in the Middle East.

== Doum Palm ==
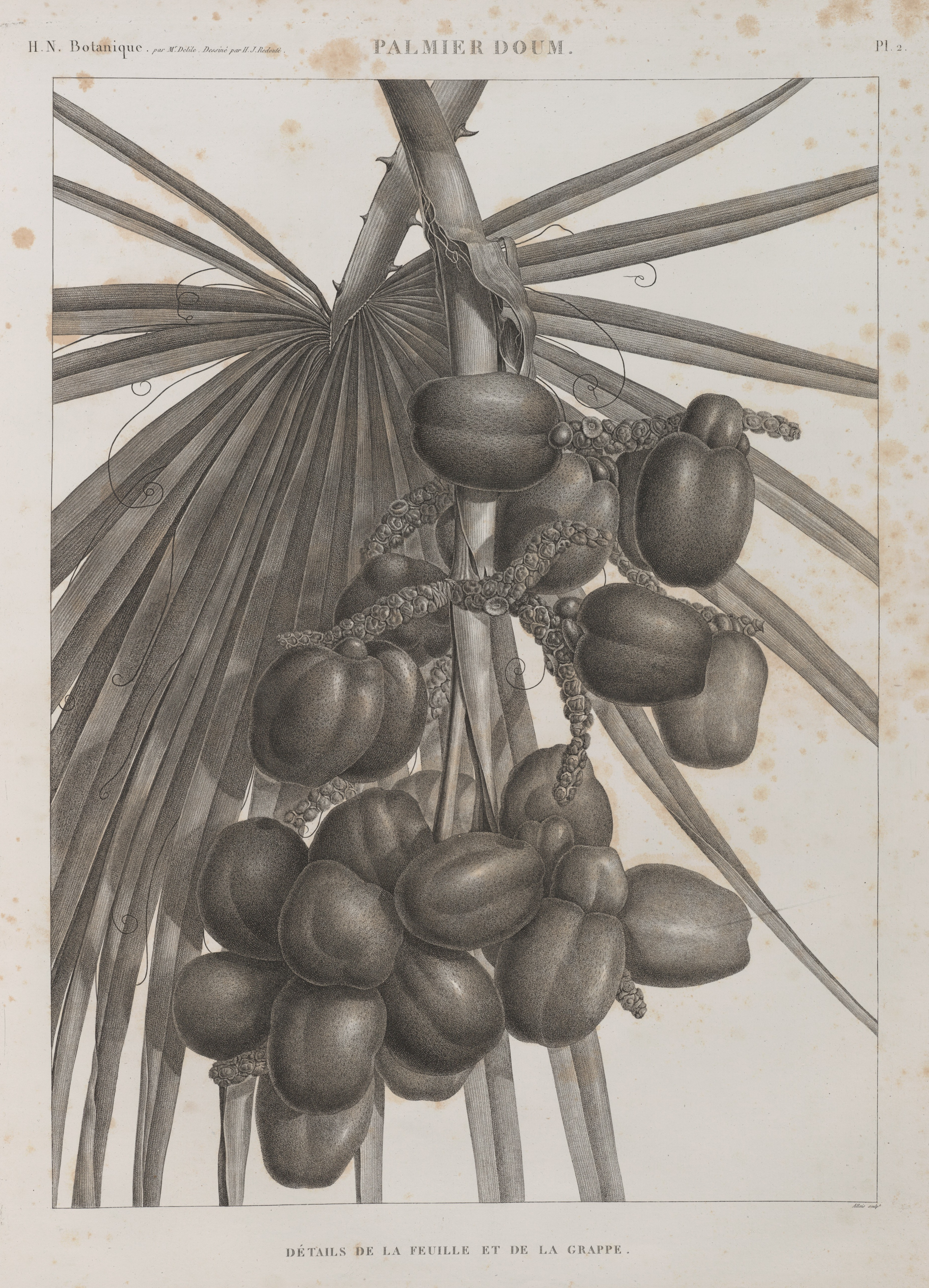
Detail of Doum Palm leaf & fruit

Doum-palm has been recorded in ancient Egyptian history as far back as written records have been dated. It is seen in early papyri, hieroglyphs, temple paintings, on jewels, mortuary writings, and seen as places of sanctity in both the physical life and the after-life, providing cool shade and plentiful fruit. This palm also held significance in its medicinal properties, as the fruits and roots could be prepared to treat stomach ailments, bladder burns, and dress wounds.

== Ankh ==
The ankh symbol is believed to represent the origin of life through its ceremonial shape, having a loop with two protruding ends on each side and one elongated leg coming from the center of these ends. Some believe its symbolism to be in connection with the anatomical thoracic vertebrae in bulls, due to the belief in the spine being a life-force, or in connection to the reproductive process between humans.

== Scarab Beetle ==
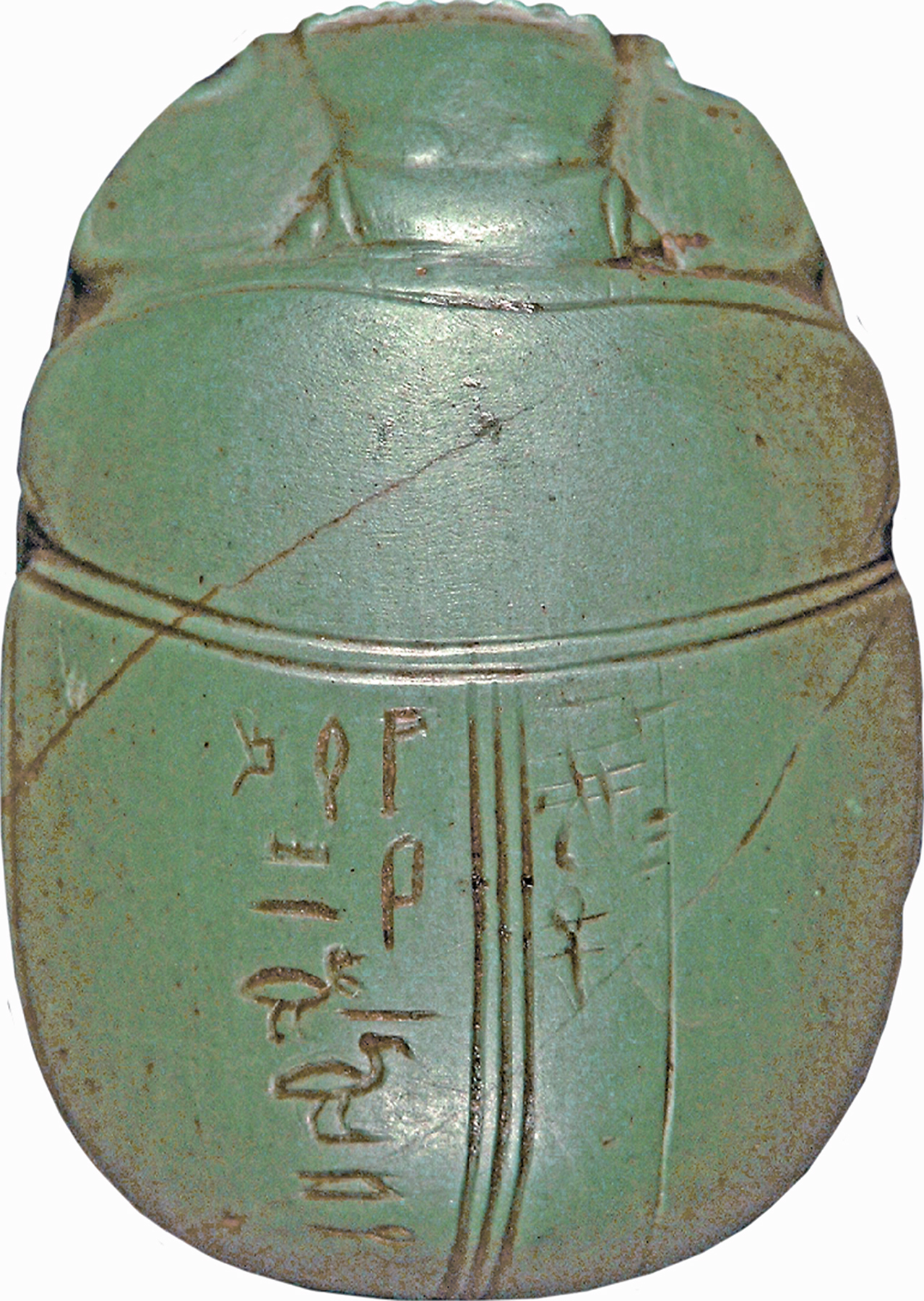
Heart scarab (front)

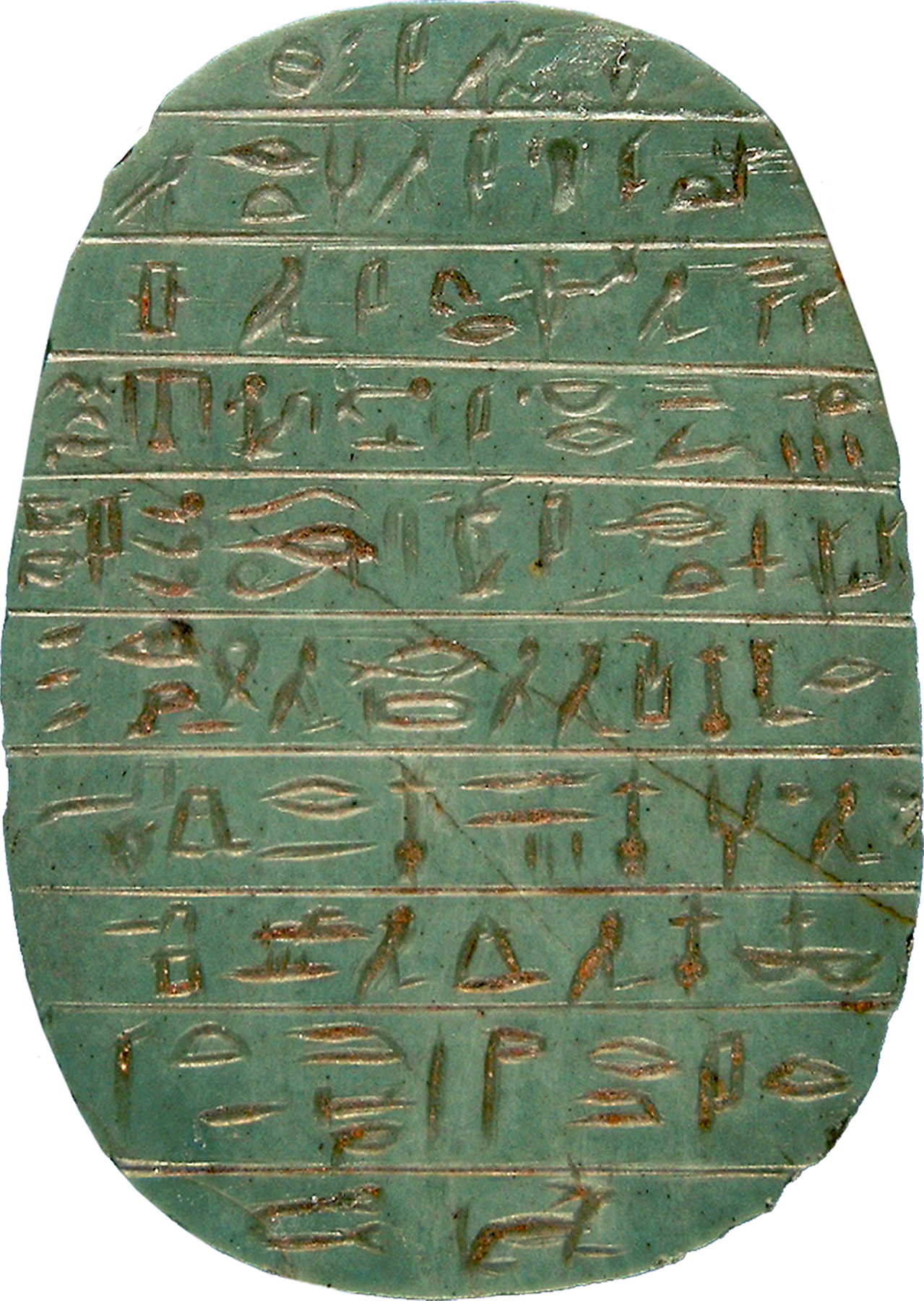
Heart scarab (back inscription)

The scarab beetle is often seen depicted with a sphere in between its mandibles, most often thought to be an egg, representing its connection not only to the divinity of creation, but also to the Sun-god, Ra, as the Sun gives life to all on Earth. In the processes of mummification, scarabs were often placed atop the heart of the deceased or put in place of their heart during the embalming process. the scarab beetle is associated with supernatural powers of eternal life, creation, and the action of becoming. It is also associated with the word "Kheper," meaning transformation.
