= Land of The Two Rivers =

Land of The Two Rivers may refer to:

- Mesopotamia
- "Ardulfurataini", a former national anthem of Iraq
