= Tuqan family =

Jordanian-Palestinian political and business family

The Tuqan clan (Arabic: طوقان, romanized: Ṭūqān; also variously romanized as Toukan, Touqan, Tukan, and Tokan) is a prominent Palestinian and Jordanian political and business family. During the Ottoman era, they dominated the political and socio-economic spheres in Nablus and extended their influence to al-Salt. During that era, they were the only household that came close to establishing centralized rule over Jabal Nablus. Over the course of the 18th and 19th centuries the Tuqan family held the title of mutasallim (tax collector/governor) of Nablus longer than any other local family.

== History ==
=== Origins ===
According to Palestinian historian Muhammad Muslih, the Tuqan family traces their ancestry to an ancient tribe from northern Arabia. For centuries, they resided in Transjordan, particularly in Ma'an and the eastern Jordan Valley. They claim to have settled in Nablus during the 12th century. However, according to Palestinian-American historian Beshara Doumani, the political branch of the Tuqan family originated from northern Syria. This branch of the Tuqans were known by the appellation Bey or Beik. According to Doumani, they settled in the town of Nablus, which was the administrative and commercial center of the Jabal Nablus region, in the years following the Ottoman centralization campaign in Jabal Nablus in 1657. Doumani distinguishes between the political branch of the family and the Khawaja branch, which was heavily involved in commerce. The Tuqans had already been a prominent clan before their migration to Jabal Nablus, with many members being timariot (timar holders, who were akin to fief holders), including a certain Hajj Mahmud Tuqan, who had been a wealthy merchant. His son Ibrahim Agha Tuqan held a za'amah (large timar) and served as a commander of a military unit securing the annual Hajj pilgrim caravan alongside the amir al-hajj (commander of the Hajj caravan).

In Jabal Nablus the Tuqans formed part of the Qaisi tribo-political federation, along with the Jarrar (migrated to Nablus in 1670) and Rayyan clans. These families traced their lineage to the northern Arabian Qaisi tribes, whereas their Yamani counterparts traced their roots to South Arabia. The Qais and Yaman divisions existed throughout Palestine and served as the primary basis of political orientation. The two sides had a centuries-long history of rivalry and warfare lasting through the late 19th century. Members of the Nimr clan, who formed part of the Yamani federation, had served as elite sipahi officers during the 1657 Ottoman campaign and soon after established Nablus as their base of power and wealth. Initially, the Tuqans and Nimrs established friendly relations and intermarried. The Tuqans' most prominent member during the early 18th century and a son of Ibrahim Agha, Hajj Salih Pasha al-Tuqan, married a woman from the Nimr clan. However, internecine competition between the Tuqans and the Nimrs, exacerbated by the political maneuverings of the provincial authorities in Damascus, eventually triggered a serious rift between the two families.

=== Peak of power ===
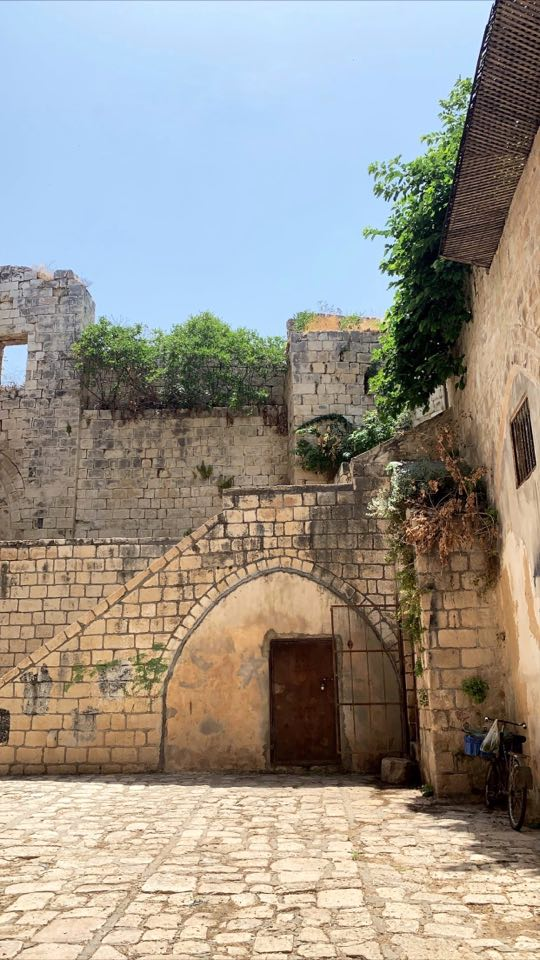
Remains of Touqan Palace, Nablus

Like his father Ibrahim Agha, Hajj Salih Pasha started his military career with the Ottomans by leading a military contingent protecting the annual Hajj pilgrim caravan alongside the amir al-hajj. He was appointed mutasallim (tax collector and local law enforcer) of Jerusalem in 1709 and was later made mutasallim of the Black Sea town of Trabzon. He was assigned the mutasallim of the Nablus, Gaza and Lajjun sanjaks (districts) in 1723. He died in 1742.

In 1766, Mustafa Bey Tuqan gained appointment as chief of the Bani Sa'b nahiya (subdistrict), replacing the Jayyusi clan, which had controlled Bani Sa'b since the late Mamluk era (1290-1517). This marked the first time an urban family of Nablus ousted rural chieftains from the town's hinterland. The move consequently brought the Tuqans into conflict with the rural Jarrars, the most powerful of the rural clans. It also brought the Tuqans into future conflict with Daher al-Umar, the virtually autonomous Arab sheikh of Galilee who sought to control the cotton-rich plains of Bani Sa'b. The tension between the Tuqans and the Jarrars was further raised when the new wali (provincial governor) of Damascus, Muhammad Pasha al-Azm, appointed Mustafa Bey as mutasallim of Nablus in 1771. Muhammad Pasha also commissioned Mustafa Bey to collect the miri (tax earmarked for the Hajj pilgrimage caravan) from the subdistricts of Jabal Nablus, a traditional responsibility of the wali of Damascus. This moved angered the Jarrars who had historically maintained much closer relations with the authorities in Damascus than the Tuqans.

The Jarrars' fears of Tuqan dominance compelled them to allow the forces of Daher al-Umar, whom the Jarrars had been at war with since the 1730s, to pass through their territories around Jenin to attack the Tuqans in Nablus. Prior to Daher's march to Nablus, he captured Jaffa in August 1771 and drove out its mutasallim and Mustafa Bey's brother, Ahmad Bey Tuqan. Not long after, Daher captured the Bani Sa'b subdistrict and forced Mustafa Bey to retreat to Nablus. Mustafa Bey received help from the Nimrs and the two families prepared the city's defenses. The Tuqans positioned themselves to the west of Khan al-Tujjar, while the Nimrs positioned themselves to the east. Their combined forces totaled about 12,000 riflemen, whose composition included many of their peasant loyalists. Daher besieged the town for nine days, but after several skirmishes and one major confrontation, Daher withdrew to avoid a bloody stalemate. His forces proceeded to cut off the roads leading to Damascus and plundered caravans leaving Nablus to punish the Tuqans and the Nimrs. This turn of events cast the Tuqans as the loyal servants of the Ottoman Empire defending its authority in the face of Daher's rebellious forces. In May 1772, the Tuqans recaptured Jaffa from Daher's forces, but Daher took it back after a nine-month siege.

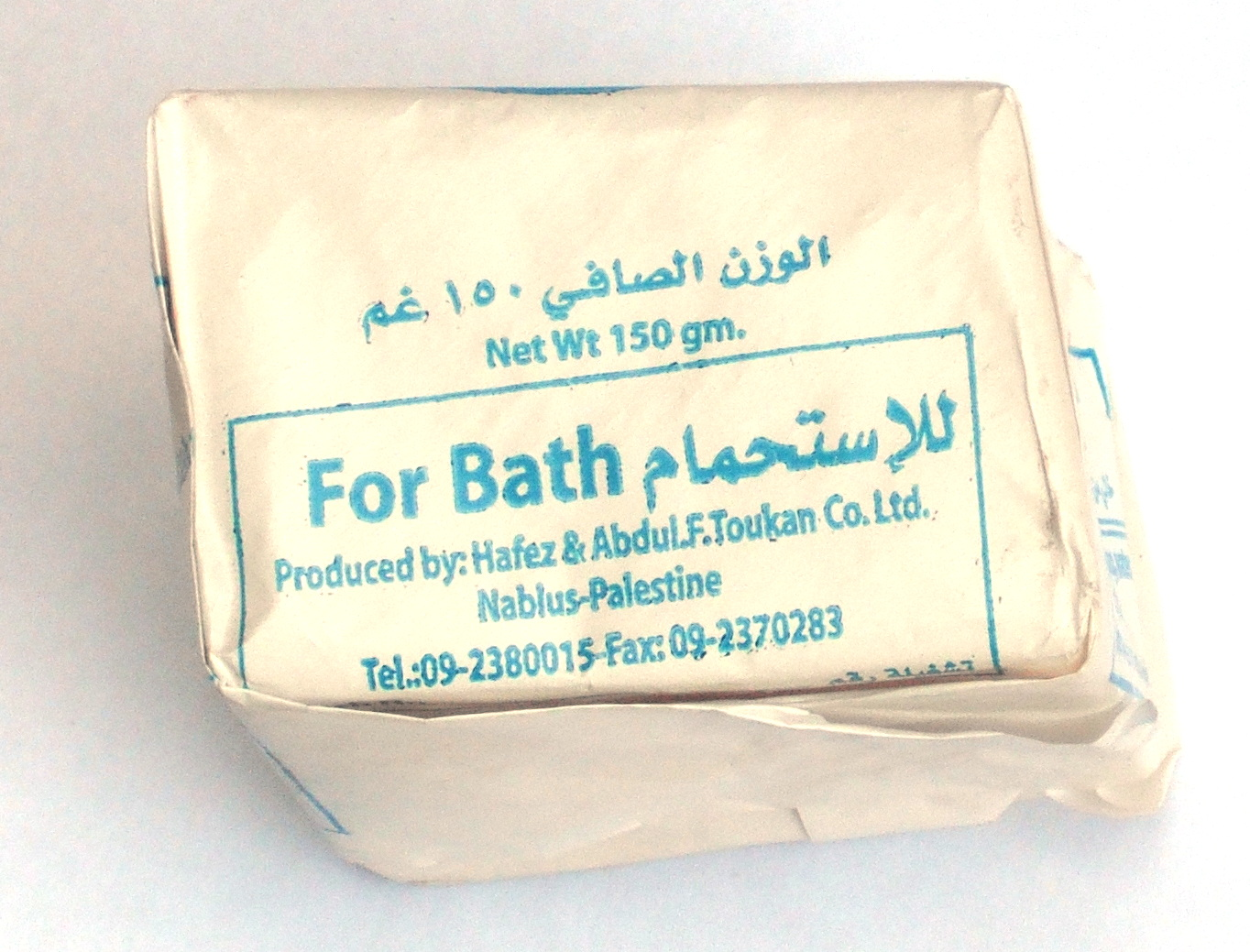
Soap, from a Toukan factory in Nablus

Musa Bey Tuqan, (the longest reigning mutasallim of Nablus since the late 17th-century) strove to establish centralized rule over Jabal Nablus. To finance his drive for power, he sought to dominate Nabulsi soap production by acquiring various soap factories. In September 1798, the Tuqan family had arranged for the purchase of the Rukabiyya soap factory. Throughout early January 1799, they consolidated their hold over the Uthmaniyya factory through a waqf (religious trust) exchange with a less wealthy branch of their family. Muhammad ibn Ali Tuqan forced a waqf exchange of the entire Shafi'iyya soap factory from Qasim Shafi'i for the low sum of 150 piasters in 1801. In February 1807, Musa Bey gained control of the Ya'ishiyya factory from the Hanbalis after the leading member of the family died with heavy debt. By December 1811, the Tuqans endowed two-thirds of the Shaytaniyya factory as a private family waqf, the implication being that this share was newly acquired. In another instance, Musa Bey persuaded Muhammad ibn Isma‘il Qadi-Shwayka to invalidate a previous sale of his right to use one quarter of the Bashawiyya soap factory to Muhammad Sa'id Bustamin (December 1815 – January 1816). By April 1817, Musa Bey purchased the allegedly damaged Gharzaniyya after another waqf exchange within his own extended family. Musa Bey was assassinated by his rivals on 20 December 1823. This put an end to a prolonged period of conflict that eroded his family's material base. Many of the Tuqans' key properties, including those that were endowed as family waqfs, were confiscated after Musa Bey's death.

=== Decline ===
Soon after their conquest of Ottoman Syria in 1831, Ibrahim Pasha of Egypt deported the leading figures of the Tuqan family to Egypt and promoted the Abd al-Hadi family of Arraba instead. The only remaining leader of the family, Yusuf ibn Ahmad Tuqan continued to own a small number of soap factories.

Today, the Tuqan family still operates one of the two remaining soap factories in Nablus. The industry has been severely damaged by the circumstances of the Second Intifada, the Israeli occupation and checkpoints.

=== Influence in Salt ===
In the last quarter of the 19th century, Dawud Effendi Tuqan, a Palestinian scion of the Tuqan family, settled in Salt in the Balqa region of Transjordan as a merchant. He soon took advantage of the increased Ottoman presence in the area, buying and building shops and warehouses for the sale and storage of commercial goods. His business was centered on selling products manufactured in Palestine to the local market and in turn reselling pastoral and agricultural products from Transjordan in Palestinian towns.

Building on the commercial advantages of the Tuqan family's trade network, Dawud Effendi soon diversified his activities to include monetary loans. He provided funding at a time when Transjordanians faced a need for monetary liquidity due to infrastructural developments. Between both businesses, the Tuqan family in Salt had established a vast network of contacts with hundreds of herders and farmers in the Balqa District. With the newfound wealth of the Tuqan family in Salt, a new commercial quarter developed in the city known as the Nabulsi Quarter. Dawud Effendi commissioned the construction of a large estate in the quarter alongside the manors of other prominent Nablus families.

== List of notable Tuqan members ==
- Baha Toukan - Ambassador of Jordan
- Ahmad Toukan - former Prime Minister of Jordan
- Alia Toukan Al-Hussein – former Queen of Jordan
- Fadwa Tuqan – Palestinian contemporary poet
- Fawwaz Tuqan – poet, novelist, writer and university professor in Jordan.
- Ibrahim Tuqan – Palestinian contemporary poet
- Ja'afar Tuqan – award-winning architect in Jordan
- Khaled Toukan - former Minister of Education (2000-2008) and current Minister of Energy (2011) in Jordan
- Haya bint Hussein - former wife of Sheikh Mohammed bin Rashid Al Maktoum
- Dana Firas - the wife of HRH Prince Firas bin Ra'ad
- Umayya Toukan -Deputy Prime Minister and Minister of State for Economic Affairs in Jordan
- *Suleiman Tukan -Mayor of Nablus from 1925-1950; member of various Jordanian cabinets in the 1950s; Minister of Agriculture and Defense in 1951. Appointed Minister of Defense and Military Governor in 1957.

== Bibliography ==
- Doumani, B (1995). Rediscovering Palestine: Merchants and Peasants in Jabal Nablus, 1700-1900. University of California Press. ISBN 0-520-08895-6.
- Joudah, Ahmad Hasan (1987). Revolt in Palestine in the Eighteenth Century: The Era of Shaykh Zahir Al-ʻUmar. Kingston Press. ISBN 9780940670112.
- Muslih, Muhammad Y. (1989). The Origins of Palestinian Nationalism. Columbia University Press. p. 146. ISBN 978-0-231-06509-2. "Izzat Darwaza."
