= Al-Taweel =

Al-Taweel (or al-Tawil) is both a given name and a surname. Notable people with the name include:

- al-Taweel of Saudi Arabia (born 1983), Saudi Arabian philanthropist and ex-princess
- Kamal Al Taweel (1922–2003), Egyptian composer
- Muhammad al-Tawil of Huesca (died c. 913), administrator in what is now Spain
- Issam Al Tawil (born 1989), Syrian tennis player
