= Wallāh Zamān, Yā Silāḥī =

Former national anthem

English: It's Been So Long, O My Weapon
- National anthem of the UAR Former national anthem of Egypt Former national anthem of Iraq (instrumental only) Former national anthem of Libya
- Lyrics: Salah Jahin
- Music: Kamal Al Taweel
- Adopted: 20 May 1960 (by the United Arab Republic); 2 July 1965 (by Iraq); 1 September 1969 (by Libya); 11 September 1971 (by Egypt)
- Relinquished: 11 September 1971 (by the United Arab Republic); 26 March 1979 (by Egypt); 17 July 1981 (by Iraq); 2 March 1977 (by Libya)
- Preceded by: Salam Affandina (Egypt; 1958); Humat ad Diyar (Syria; 1958); Mawtini (Iraq; 1965); Libya, Libya, Libya (Libya; 1969)
- Succeeded by: Humat ad-Diyar (Syria; 1961); Allahu Akbar (Libya; 1977, as sole anthem); Bilady, Bilady, Bilady (Egypt; 1979); Ardulfurataini (Iraq; 1981)

Audio sample
- Full vocal version: file; help

Instrumental recording of the anthem

"Wallāh Zamān, Yā Silāḥī" (Arabic: والله زمان يا سلاحي) was the national anthem of the United Arab Republic (UAR), a federation of Egypt and Syria, from 1960. Though the UAR disbanded in 1961, Egypt retained it as the official name of the state until 1971, and used its national anthem until 1979. It was also used as the national anthem of Iraq from 1963 to 1981. The lyrics are usually sung in Egyptian Arabic rather than Modern Standard Arabic.

== History ==
Prior to being adopted as the UAR's national anthem, it was used as a nationalist song performed by Umm Kulthum during the Suez Crisis in 1956, known in Egypt and the Arab world as the Tripartite Aggression, when Egypt was invaded by the United Kingdom, France, and Israel. Due to its lyrics evoking national resistance, the song was played frequently on Egyptian radio during the war, sometimes as often as every 10 minutes.

The popularity of the song led to it being adopted as the national anthem of the UAR two years after the establishment of the union. It replaced the former official royal anthem of Egypt "Salām ʾAfandīnā" (سلام افندينا), composed by Giuseppe Pugioli, as well as "Nashīd al-Ḥuriyya" (نشيد الحرية), composed and sung by Mohammed Abdel Wahab; they were adopted following the Egyptian revolution of 1952 and the abolition of the monarchy, as well as the former national anthem of Syria.

The lyrics were written by Salah Jahin, with music by Kamal Al Taweel. It was also used, without words, by Iraq from 1965 to 1981.

It was eventually replaced in 1979 for the peace negotiations with Israel by President Anwar Sadat as Egypt's national anthem by the less militant "Bilady, Bilady, Bilady", which continues to be Egypt's national anthem today.

== Lyrics ==
Arabic original

١
𝄇 وَالله زَمَان يَا سِلَاحِي
اِشْتَقْتِ لَك فِي كِفَاحِي
اِنْطَق وَقُول أَنَا صَاحِي
يَا حَرْبِ وَالله زَمَان 𝄆

𝄇 وَالله زَمَان عَالْجُنُود
زَاحْفَة بِتِرْعِد رِعُود 𝄆
حَالْفَة تِرُوحْ لَمْ تِعُود
إِلَّا بِنَصْرِ الْزَّمَان

كوُراَل:
𝄇 هِمُّوا وَضُمُّوا الْصُّفُوف
شِيلُوا الْحَيَاة عَالْكُفُوف 𝄆
يَامَا الْعَدُوّ رَاح يِشُوف
مِنْكُمْ فِي نَارِ الْمِيدَان

٢
وَالله زَمَان يَا سِلَاحِي
اِشْتَقْتِ لَك فِي كِفَاحِي
اِنْطَق وَقُول أَنَا صَاحِي
يَا حَرْبِ وَالله زَمَان

𝄇 يَا مَجْدِنَا يَا مَجْدِنَا
يَا الْلِّي تْبَنَيْت مِنْ عَنْدِنَا 𝄆
𝄇 بِشَقَانَا وَكَدِّنَا 𝄆
عُمْرَكْ مَا تِبْقَى هَوَان

كوُراَل

وَالله زَمَان يَا سِلَاحِي
اِشْتَقْتِ لَك فِي كِفَاحِي
اِنْطَق وَقُول أَنَا صَاحِي
يَا حَرْبِ وَالله زَمَان

٣
𝄇 مَصْرِ الْحُرَّة مِينْ يَحْمِيهَا
نَحْمِيهَا بِسْلَاحْنَا
أَرْضِ الْثَّوْرَة مِينْ يِفْدِيهَا
نِفْدِيهَا بَأَرْوَاحْنَا 𝄆

𝄇 اَلْشَّعْب بِيَزْحَف زَىِّ الْنُّور
اَلْشَّعْب جِبَال اَلْشَّعْب بُحُور
بُرْكَان غَضْبَان بُرْكَان بِيَفُور
زِلزَال بِيَشُقّ لُهُمْ فِي قُبُور 𝄆

𝄇 كوُراَل 𝄆

Romanization of Arabic

I
𝄆 Wallāh zamān, yā silāḥī
Ištaqti lak fī kifāḥī
Inṭaq wa-qūl ʾanā ṣāḥī
Yā ḥarbi wallāh zamān. 𝄇

𝄆 Wallāh zamān ʿa-l-junūd
Zāḥfa bi-tirʿid riʿūd 𝄇
Ḥālfa tirūḥ lam tiʿūd
Illā bi-naṣri z-zamān.

Kūrāl:
𝄆 Himmū wa-ḍummu ṣ-ṣufūf
Šīlū l-ḥayāh ʿa-l-kufūf 𝄇
Yāmā l-ʿaduww rāḥ yišūf
Minkum fī nāri l-mīdān.

II
𝄆 Wallāh zamān, yā silāḥī
Ištaqti lak fī kifāḥī
Inṭaq wa-qūl ʾanā ṣāḥī
Yā ḥarbi wallāh zamān. 𝄇

𝄆 Yā majdinā yā majdinā
Yā l-li tbanayt min ʿandinā 𝄇
𝄆 Bi-šaqānā wa-kaddinā 𝄇
ʿUmrak mā tibqā hawān.

Kūrāl

𝄆 Wallāh zamān, yā silāḥī
Ištaqti lak fī kifāḥī
Inṭaq wa-qūl ʾanā ṣāḥī
Yā ḥarbi wallāh zamān. 𝄇

III
𝄆 Maṣri l-ḥurra mīn yaḥmīhā
Naḥmīhā bi-slāḥnā
ʾArḍi ṯ-ṯawra mīn yifdīhā
Nifdīha bi-ʾarwāḥnā. 𝄇

𝄆 Aš-šaʿb bi-yazḥaf zayyi n-nūr
Aš-šaʿb jibāl aš-šaʿb buḥūr
Burkān ġaḍbān burkān bi-yafūr
Zilzāl bi-yašuqq luhum fī qubūr. 𝄇

𝄆 Kūrāl 𝄇

English translation

I
𝄆 It has been a long time, oh my weapon!
I long for you in my struggle!
Speak and say I am awake,
Oh war it has been a long time. 𝄇

𝄆 It has been a long time for the soldiers,
Advancing with thunderous roar, 𝄇
Swearing never to return,
Except with epoch-making victory.

Chorus:
𝄆 Rise and close ranks,
With lives ready for sacrifice. 𝄇
O! the horror that the enemy shall suffer,
From you in the fire of the battlefield.

II
It has been a long time, oh my weapon!
I long for you in my struggle!
Speak and say I am awake,
Oh war it has been a long time.

𝄆 O! glory our glory,
You who was built by us, 𝄇
𝄆 By toil and pain, 𝄇
Never to go to waste.

Chorus

It has been a long time, oh my weapon!
I long for you in my struggle!
Speak and say I am awake,
Oh war it has been a long time.

III
𝄆 Who shall protect Free Egypt?
We shall protect her with our weapons.
Land of the Revolution, who will sacrifice for her sake?
We will, with our souls. 𝄇

𝄆 The people advance like the light,
The people stand like mountains and seas,
Volcanoes of anger, volcanoes erupting,
Earthquakes digging the enemy into their graves. 𝄇

𝄆 Chorus 𝄇
