= Hassan Khalil Abdullah =

Lebanese poet (1943 or 1944–2022)

- Born: 1943/1944; Khiam, South Lebanon
- Died: 21 June 2022
- Occupations: Poet, children's writer
- Writing career
- Genres: Poetry, children's literature

Hassan Khalil Al-Abdullah (1943 (or 1944)- 21 June 2022) is a Lebanese poet and writer, known for many published creative works, with some of his poems being sung by several Lebanese artists. He has been honored multiple times and has received several awards.

== Biography ==
Hassan Khalil Al-Abdullah, born in Khiam – South Lebanon, grew up in a family passionate about popular literature, which inspired his love for stories and myths. He started writing poetry at an early age. He received his primary and secondary education in his hometown of Khiam and pursued his university studies in Beirut. He earned a degree in Arabic literature and taught literature for a long time.

== Cultural Activities ==
Hassan Al-Abdullah wrote for children and published about sixty books in poetry and prose that became a significant milestone in children's literature in Lebanon and the Arab world. He participated in local and international poetry festivals and took part in Arabic literary seminars and conferences. Selections of his poetry have been translated into French, English, German, Spanish, and Russian.

He ceased writing poetry for about 18 years, then returned with his collection "Ra'i al-Dabab" (The Shepherd of the Mist), which represented a qualitative leap in his poetic journey and gained the interest of critics due to its harsh realism, direct language, and expressive dimensions.Some of his poems for children were turned into songs, with music composed by Walid Gholmieh and Ahmad Kaabour. Additionally, the artist Marcel Khalife sang his poems "A'jamal al-Ummahat" ("The Most Beautiful Mothers") and "Min Ayna Adkhul Fi Al-Watan" ("Where Do I Enter My Homeland"), and Khalid Al-Habour also sang from his poetry.

Unlike the prevailing trend in poetry, Hassan Al-Abdullah tends toward "realistic" poetry, employing an influential descriptive style that uncovers hidden relationships threatening human existence.

Most of Al-Abdullah's poems revolve around parts of his biography, from Khiam to Sidon and Beirut. However, the events of this biography are charged with reflections that reflect a phase transition culturally and socially.

On the other hand, his autobiographical poetry transcends its historical context to take on a dramatic turn, shaped by contemporary experiences and expressing his strained relationship with reality.

Hassan Al-Abdullah published his poems in several literary magazines and newspapers, and in the early part of his career, he also published several short stories.

== His Poetry Works ==
- I Remember That I Loved – Dar Al-Farabi - 1972
- Al-Dardarah – Dar Al-Farabi - 1981
- The Fog Shepherd – Dar Riyad Al-Rais for Books and Publishing - 1999
- The Shadow of the Rose – Dar Al-Saqi Publishing and Distribution - 2012

== His Contributions to Children's Literature ==
He has produced a vast amount of children's literature and won several awards for it. Some of his most notable books for children include:

- I Am the Aleph

- Mazen and the Ant. This story was adapted into a film directed by Burhan Alawiya for Al Jazeera.

- Joy

- The Chicken of the House That Left.

- The Butterfly Catcher.

- Two Birds.

- The Farmer and the Duck.

- Return to the Forest.

- Friend of the Stars.

== Awards ==
He has won several literary awards and was honored at the 11th International Children's Cinema Festival in Cairo. In 2002, the Egyptian Ministry of Culture awarded him a prize for his overall contribution to children's literature.

In 2012, he won the Literary Creativity Award in the field of Children's Literature from the Arab Thought Foundation.

He won the Sheikh Zayed Prize for Children's Literature in its 11th edition for his book "Friend of the Stars" in 2016.
