= Royal Salute (Iraq) =

1924–1958 national anthem of Iraq (Mandate then Kingdom)

The Royal Salute
- السلام الملكي
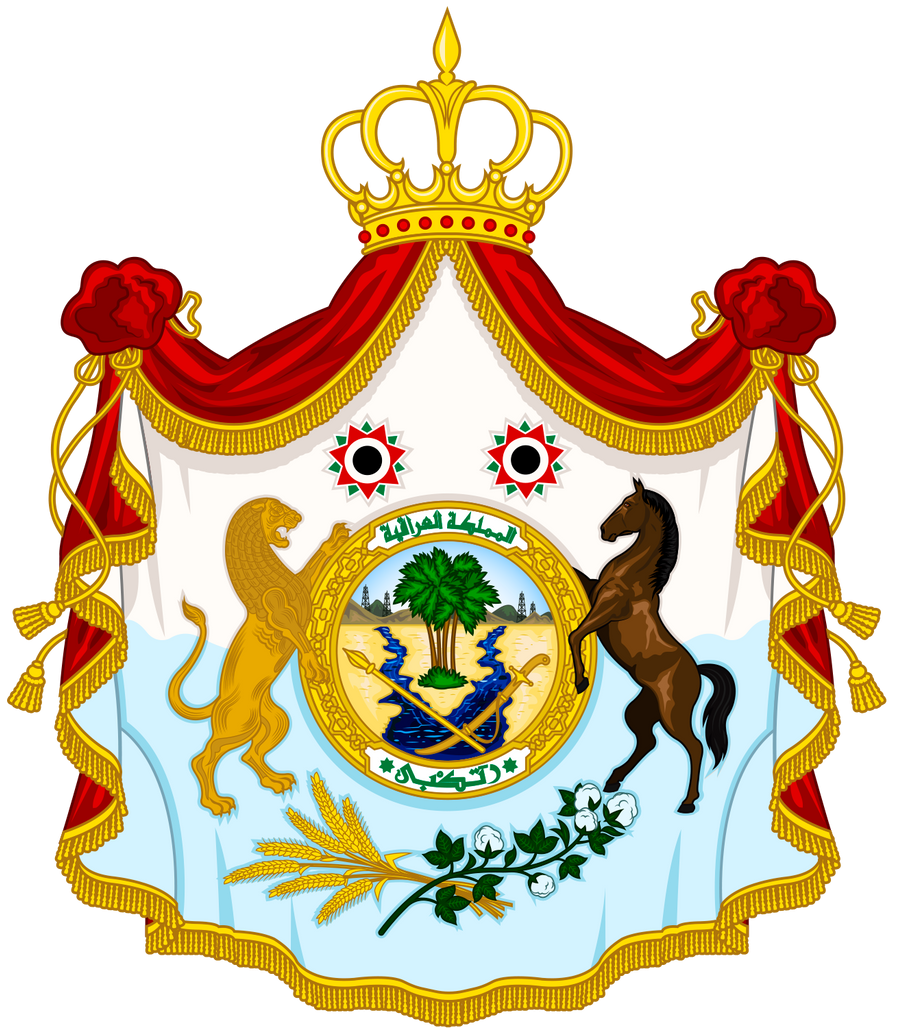
- Former national anthem of Iraq
- Music: A. Chaffon, 1924
- Adopted: 1924
- Relinquished: July 14, 1958
- Succeeded by: "Mawtini"

Audio sample
- file; help

The Royal Salute (Arabic: السلام الملكي, romanized: as-Salām al-Malakī) was the national anthem of Mandatory Iraq during 1924–1932 and the Kingdom of Iraq during 1932–1958.

== History ==
It was composed by Iraqi Army Band director Lieutenant A. Chaffon in 1924, a British military officer.

== See also ==
- "Ardulfurataini", the former Iraqi national anthem, used from 1981 to 2003.
- "Mawtini", the current Iraqi national anthem since 2003.
