= Conservatoire Libanais =

Musical conservatory in Beirut, Lebanon

- Type: Conservatory
- Established: 1930s
- Founders: Wadia Sabra
- Principal: Bassam Saba
- Academic staff: 250
- Students: 4800
- Location: Beirut

Le Conservatoire libanais national supérieur de musique or The Lebanese National Higher Conservatory of Music was founded in the 1930s by Wadia Sabra, composer of the national anthem of Lebanon. Sabra's goal was to establish an institute of higher learning for music. The Conservatoire, which was headed by the well-known composer and conductor, Dr. Walid Gholmieh has more than 4,800 students taught by 250 professors. The Conservatoire is headquartered in Beirut with branches in Tripoli, Jounieh, Dhour El Choueir, Zahlé, Aley and Sidon.

Since 1999, the Conservatoire has managed two orchestras, l’Orchestre symphonique national du Liban (Lebanese National Symphony Orchestra) and l’Orchestre national de musique arabe-orientale (The Lebanese National Orchestra for Oriental Arabic Music) or Lebanese Oriental Orchestra (L.O.O.). The latter was established in June, 2000 and consists of around 50 musicians.
