= Mawtini (L. Zanbaka song) =

Former national anthem of Iraq

English: My Homeland
- موطني
- Flag of First Republic of Iraq
- Former national anthem of Iraq
- Music: Lewis Zanbaka, 1958
- Adopted: 1958
- Readopted: 2003
- Relinquished: 1965, 2004
- Preceded by: "As-Salam al-Malaki" (1958) "Ardh ul-Furatayn" (2003)
- Succeeded by: "Walla Zaman Ya Selahy" (1965) "Mawtini" (2004)

Audio sample
- file; help

Old orchestral rendition

Another orchestral rendition

Another Old orchestral rendition

"Mawtini" (Arabic: موطني, lit. 'My Homeland') was the national anthem of Iraq from 1958 to 1965, and then again from 2003 to 2004. It is solely an instrumental composition and thus has no lyrics.

== History ==
"Mawtini" was composed by Lewis Zanbaka and was originally adopted as Iraq's national anthem in 1958. It is a short instrumental composition, having no lyrics. "Mawtini" was used as the national anthem of Iraq until 1965; it was readopted in 2003 for a short time after the fall of Saddam Hussein's Ba'athist regime. In November 2004, "Mawtini" was replaced in its capacity as the Iraqi national anthem with a new national anthem, coincidentally also called "Mawtini", of no relation.
