= Mohammad Al-Abbasi =

Prime minister of Jordan

Mohammad Daoud Al-Abbasi
- الزعيم محمد داود
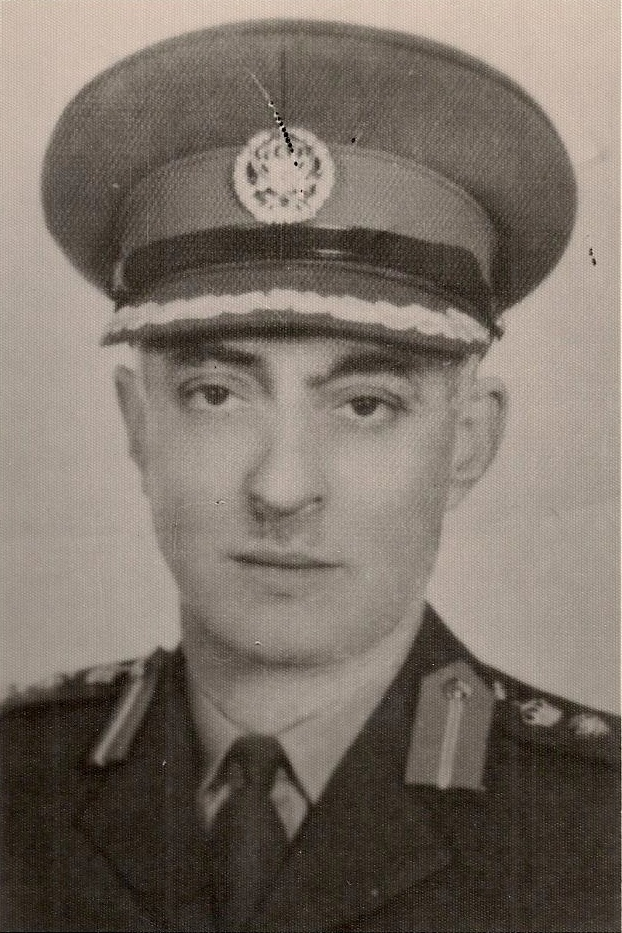

19th Prime Minister of Jordan
- In office 16 September 1970 – 26 September 1970
- Monarch: King Hussein
- Preceded by: Abdelmunim al-Rifai
- Succeeded by: Ahmad Toukan

Personal details
- Born: 11 July 1914 Silwan, Jerusalem, Ottoman Palestine
- Died: 19 January 1972 (aged 57) Amman, Jordan
- Party: Independent

Military service
- Allegiance: Jordan
- Branch/service: Royal Jordanian Army
- Battles/wars: First Arab-Israeli War; Retribution operations Six-Day War

Brigadier General Mohammad Daoud Al-Abbasi (Arabic: الزعيم محمد داود; 11 July 1914 – 19 January 1972) was a Jordanian politician and the Prime Minister of Jordan and Minister of Foreign Affairs of the military government in Jordan during the Jordanian Civil War.

== Early life ==
Mohammad Daoud Al-Abbasi was born in Silwan, Jerusalem, Palestine. He worked as a police officer in the city of Tulkarm in the West Bank, which was then a part of Jordan until the Six-Day War.

In 1952, he became a member of the Jordanian delegation of the Jordan–Israel Mixed Armistice Commission. He held the position of Presidency of the joint Jordanian delegation in 1958 until the Six-Day War in 1967. In 1956, he was wounded by a mine and was rescued by an Israeli officer, Aharon Camara, because the Jordanians officers were scared to enter the mine field. During the Six-Day War, he was taken prisoner by the Israeli army for 17 days and then was released. He continued working as a head of the Jordanian/Israeli Mixed Armistice Commission until 1970. In 1969, he attained permission to enter the West Bank for the funeral of his wife.

== Black September ==
On September 16, 1970, King Hussein of Jordan declared martial law and appointed Brigadier Mohammad Daoud as Prime Minister to lead the first military government in Jordan. Despite efforts to defuse the tension between the Jordanian army and the Palestinian movements, between 16 and 25 September 1970, the escalating conflict resulted in the death of thousands and this conflict became known as Black September (also known as the Jordanian Civil War).

An Arab League Summit Committee assigned Kuwaiti Minister of Defense Saad Al-Sabah, Sudanese head of state Gaafar Nimeiry, and the Deputy Foreign Minister of Saudi Arabia, Omar Al Saqqaf to investigate and report back the cause of the clash to the Arab summit. Meanwhile, the Arab League held a meeting for all the head of Arab states in Cairo.

King Hussein assigned Al-Abbasi to join the summit. After 10 days only as a prime minister, on 24 September, out of frustration and pressure after being unable to avoid this developing conflict and the devastating results, Al-Abbasi submitted his resignation from his position to the Jordanian Ambassador in Cairo, Hazem Nuseibeh.

Al-Abbasi requested political asylum in Cairo, following his resignation. Egyptian president, Gamal Abdel Nasser, asked Al-Abbasi to stay in Cairo for consultation of Jordanian affairs.

The timing of this resignation amidst all the turbulent and rapidly developing events at that time came as a surprise to many, and it had a dramatic impact in ending the military conflict in Jordan at a faster pace.

== Illness and death ==
Al-Abbasi was hospitalized in Cairo towards the end of 1971 being diagnosed with a brain tumor, and was sent later to Paris to undergo brain surgery. Then he asked to be treated in Hadassah hospital in Jerusalem, and he was granted permission, but he could not make it. On 10 January 1972, he returned to the Military Hospital in Amman, Jordan and died 9 days later, on Wednesday 19 January.

His body was transferred from Amman to Jerusalem through Allenby Bridge after a formal funeral ceremony. A prayer was conducted at al-Aqsa mosque on Friday, 21 January 1972. He was buried at his home town Silwan as he had wished, the town where he was born and originally grew up.

Political offices
Preceded by Abdelmunim al-Rifai	Prime Minister of Jordan; 1970	Succeeded by Ahmad Toukan
