= Lebanese National Symphony Orchestra =

L’Orchestre Symphonique National du Liban (The Lebanese National Symphony Orchestra) was founded in late 1999 in Beirut under the guidance of Dr. Walid Gholmieh and the management of the Conservatoire Libanais (Lebanese National Higher Conservatory of Music). It gives 25 to 30 concerts per season at the church of the Saint Joseph University in Beirut and in other cities, playing a varied international repertoire by classical music composers.

The Orchestra has participated in the programs of the Al Bustan Winter Festival in Beit Mery and the Baalbeck International Festival.

They were also featured on an unreleased track by the band Gorillaz named "Whirlwind", from their third studio album Plastic Beach, but which was cut from it before its release.
