= Sayed Darwish =

Egyptian singer and composer (1892–1923)

Sayed Darwish السيد درويش البحر
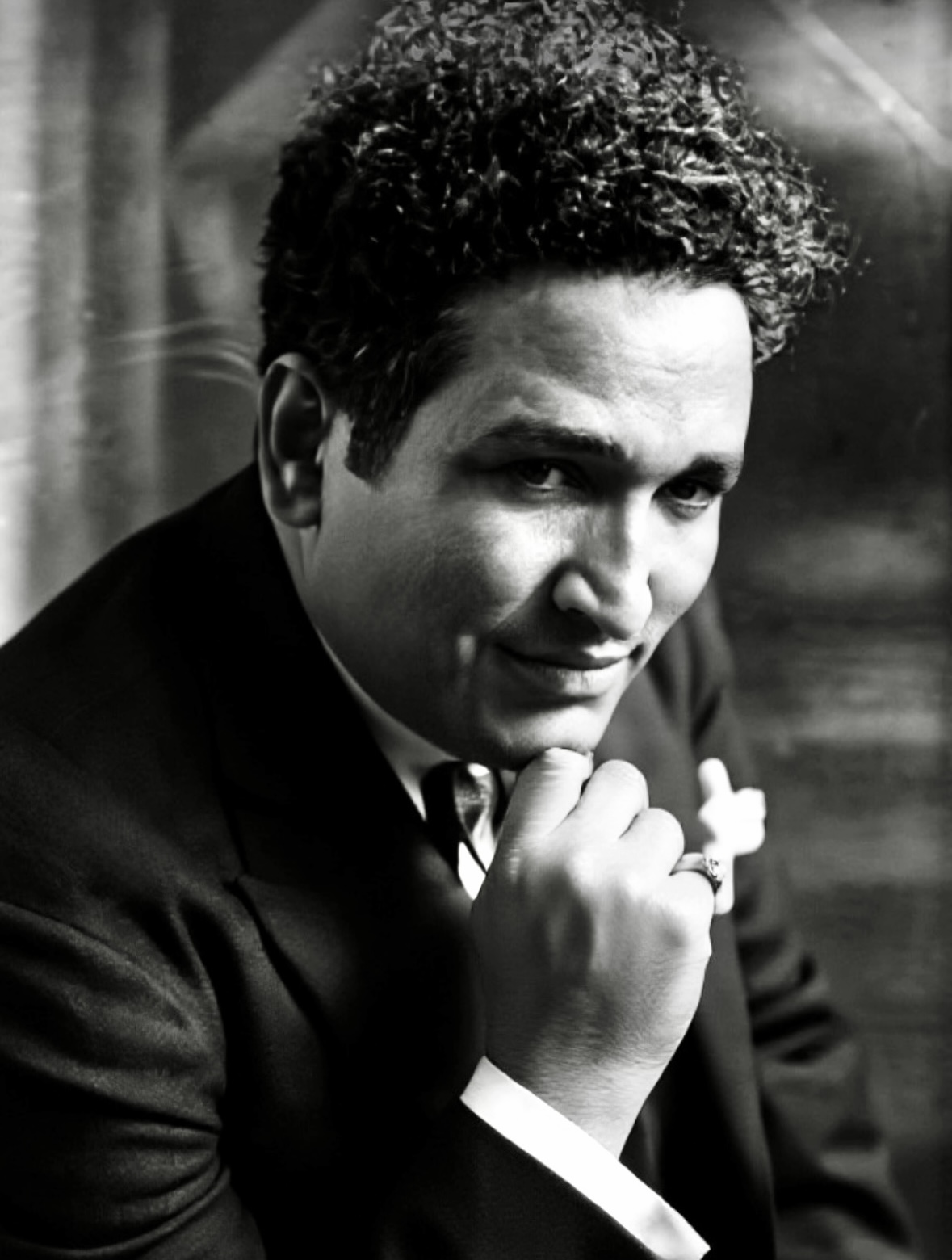
- Sayed Darwish in 1920s

Background information
- Also known as: The Father of Modern Arab Music; Father of Egyptian Popular Music
- Born: 17 March 1892
- Origin: Alexandria, Egypt
- Died: 15 September 1923 (aged 31) Alexandria, Egypt
- Genre: Egyptian music
- Occupations: Singer, songwriter, record producer, musician
- Instruments: Vocals, oud

Sayed Darwish (Arabic: سيد درويش, IPA: [ˈsæjjed dæɾˈwiːʃ]; 17 March 1892 – 14 September 1923) was an Egyptian singer and composer who was considered the father of Egyptian popular music and one of Egypt's greatest musicians and seen by some as its single greatest composer.

== Early life ==
Sayed Darwish was born in Alexandria on 17 March 1892. During his childhood his family could not afford to pay for his education, so he was sent to a religious school where he mastered the recitation of the Quran, studying under Muhammad Salamah. After graduating from the religious school and gaining the title Sheikh Sayyed Darwish, he studied for two years at al-Azhar, one of the most renowned religious universities in the world. He left his studies to devote his life to music composition and singing, then entered a music school where his music teacher admired his talents and encouraged Darwish to press onward in the music field.

Darwish at that time was also trained to be a munshid (cantor). He worked as a bricklayer in order to support his family, and it so happened that the manager of a theatrical troupe, the Syrian Attalah Brothers, overheard him singing for his fellows and hired him on the spot. While touring in Syria, he had the opportunity to gain a musical education, short of finding success. He returned to Egypt before the start of the Great War, and won limited recognition by singing in the cafés and on various stages while he learned repertoire of the great composers of the 19th century, to which he added ʾadwār (musical modes) and muwashshaḥāt (Arabic poetic-form compositions) of his own. In spite of the cleverness of his compositions, he wasn't to find public acclaim, disadvantaged by his mediocre stage presence in comparison with such stars of his time as Sâlih 'Abd al-Hayy or Zakî Murâd.

== Career ==
After too many failures in singing cafés, in 1918 he decided to follow the path of Shaykh Salama Hegazy, the pioneer of Arabic lyric theater and launched into an operatic career. He settled in Cairo and got acquainted with the main companies, particularly Naguib el-Rihani (1891–1949), for whom he composed seven operettas. This gifted comedian had invented, with the playwright and poet Badie Khayri, the laughable character of Kish Kish Bey, a rich provincial mayor squandering his fortune in Cairo with ill-reputed women... The apparition of social matters and the allusions to the political situation of colonial Egypt (the 1919 "revolution") were to boost the success of the trio's operettas, such as "al-'Ashara al-Tayyiba" (The Ten of Diamonds, 1920) a nationalistic adaptation of 'Blubeard".

He became associated with the early Egyptian modernist literary movement Al-Madrasa al-Ḥaditha.

Sayed also worked for El Rihani's rival troupe, 'Aly El Kassar's, and eventually collaborated with the Queen of Stages, singer and actress Munîra al-Mahdiyya (1884–1965), for whom he composed comic operettas such as "kullaha yawmayn" ("All of two days", 1920) and started an opera, "Cleopatra and Mark Anthony", which was to be played in 1927 with Muhammad 'Abd al-Wahhâb in the leading role. In the early twenties, all the companies sought his help. He decided to start his own company, acting at last on stage in a lead part. His two creations ("Shahrazad' and "El-Barouka", 1921) weren't as successful as planned, and he was again forced to compose for other companies from 1922 until his premature death on 15 September 1923.

Darwish's stage production is often clearly westernized: the traditional takht is replaced by a European ensemble, conducted by il Signore Casio, Darwish's maestro. Most of his operetta tunes use musical modes compatible with the piano, even if some vocal sections use other intervals, and the singing techniques employed in those compositions reveal a fascination for Italian opera, naively imitated in a cascade of oriental melismas. The light ditties of the comic plays are, from the modern point of view, much more interesting than the great opera-style arias. A number of those light melodies originally composed for Egyptian movies or theater are now part of the Egyptian folklore. Such songs as "Salma ya Salama", "Zorouni kol sana marra" or EI helwa di amet te'gen" are known by all Middle-Easterners and have been sung by modern singers, such as Fairuz and Sabah Fakhri, in re-orchestrated versions. Aside from this light production, Sayed Darwish didn't neglect the learned repertoire, he composed about twenty muwashshahat, often played by modern conservatories and sung by Fairuz. But his major contribution to the turn-of-the-century learned music is better understood through the ten adwâr (long metric composition in colloquial Arabic) he composed.

Whereas in the traditional aesthetics defined in the second part of the 19th century, the dor was built as a semi-composition, a canvas upon which a creative interpreter had to develop a personal rendition, Darwish was the first Egyptian composer to reduce drastically the extemporizing task left to the singer and the instrumental cast. Even the "ahât", this traditionally improvised section of sighs, were composed by Darwîsh in an interesting attempt of figuralism. Anecdotic arpeggios and chromaticism were for his contemporaries a token of modernism, but could be more severely judged nowadays.

Sayed Darwish was recorded by three companies: Mechian, a small local record company founded by an Armenian immigrant, which engraved the Shaykh's voice between 1914 and 1920, Odeon, the German company, which recorded extensively his light theatrical repertoire in 1922 and Baidaphon, which recorded three adwâr around 1922. His works sung by other voices are to be found on numerous records made by all the companies operating in early 20th-century Egypt.

Another song from the revolutionary repertory is Sayyid Darwish's "Ahu Da Illi Sar," which has been translated as "This is what happened," "So it goes," and "This is where we're at." Darwish is credited with modernizing Egyptian song in the early twentieth century, and is most known for compositions he created during the 1919 revolt against British occupation, as well as other songs with nationalist themes. His music was a successful means of social and political expression, greatly affecting Egyptian national consciousness. Albeit, it is commonly overlooked that the lyrics to Darwish's songs were mostly written by respected poet Badi' Khayri.

In Egypt, Darwish is regarded as an artist whose musical compositions were based on Egyptian "folk" materials and marked the first "figural expression of the soul of the people and its national demands." Most of the nationalist songs for which Darwish is best known were actually created for the musical theater and performed to the accompaniment of a European musical group led by Darwish's maestro, Signore Casio. Darwish's theatrical music was heavily Westernized, and his compositions used musical modes that were compatible with the piano, which the modernist Darwish saw as essential to his groups. He often collaborates with like minded people who represents the same nationalist ideas as him. The "Al-Nahda" (The Renaissance) movement, founded by Ahmad Urabi in 1881, had various intellectual and artistic figures, alongside other influential figures such as the sculptor Mahmoud Mukhtar, the social reformer and women's rights defender Qasim Amin, and the prominent writer Taha Hussein.

== Musical style ==
Darwish believed that genuine art must be derived from people's aspirations and feelings. In his music and songs, he truly expressed the yearnings and moods of the masses, as well as recording the events that took place during his lifetime. He dealt with the aroused national feeling against the British occupiers, the passion of the people, and social justice, and he often criticized the negative aspects of Egyptian society.

His works, blending Western instruments and harmony with classical Arab forms and Egyptian folklore, gained immense popularity due to their social and patriotic subjects. Darwish's many nationalistic melodies reflect his close ties to the national leaders who were guiding the struggle against the British occupiers. His music and songs knew no class and were enjoyed by both the poor and the affluent.

In his musical plays, catchy music and popular themes were combined in an attractive way. To some extent, Darwish liberated Arab music from its classical style, modernizing it and opening the door for future development.

Besides composing 260 songs, he wrote 26 operettas, replacing the slow, repetitive, and ornamented old style of classical Arab music with a new light and expressive flair. Some of Darwish's most popular works in this field were El Ashara'l Tayyiba, Shahrazad, and El-Barooka. These operettas, like Darwish's other compositions, were strongly reminiscent of Egyptian folk music and gained great popularity due to their social and patriotic themes.

He composed 10 dawr and 21 muwashshat which became classics in the world of Arab music. His composition "Bilaadi! Bilaadi!" (My Country! My Country!), that became Egypt's national anthem, and many of his other works are as popular today as when he was alive. in the modern Middle East.

Darwish played a key role in changing traditional "oriental" music from Ottoman classicism to a modern, popular sound that met record companies' demand for fresh taqatiq. Most taqatiq were light, with sexually suggestive and flirty themes. However, there is an increasing number of taqatiq that address nationalist or social and economic concerns. One of the earliest examples of this sort of taqtuqa was Darwish's 1914 "'Ista'gibu ya 'Afandiyya" (Isn't that shocking, oh gentlemen), which recounts the kerosene and fuel shortage and accompanying price increase on the eve of World War I. These songs quickly became popular and were widely played on gramophones across the country.

Darwish's early song, "The Fortune-Teller" ("Bassara Barraja"), was written for Munira al-Mahdiyya. The original version had subtle nationalistic overtones, with the fortune-teller declaring to her client, "It is obvious you are Egyptian... and that you have countless enemies and almost no luck." He continues by saying, "May God punish your enemies... for they are enslaving your people!" Al-Mahdiyya added an "improvised" lyric to the song, "I am Munira al-Mahdiyya, and for me the love of my nation is a passion." "I would give my life for freedom and my country, regardless of fortune." Also, he drew inspiration from street screams and everyday sounds, therefore his music had a strong cultural significance and emotional appeal to the public.

== Death ==
The life of the Sayed Darwish ended on 10 September 1923 at the young age of thirty-one. There are many accounts of the cause of his death, including that he died of an overdose of drugs, but his grandchildren have denied that story based on a letter in his handwriting in which he tells his friend that he stopped going out and staying up late with everything that accompanied that, with a tone of warning. Grandchildren also relied on what was mentioned in Badi' Khairi's memoirs—that Sheikh Sayed Darwish quit drugs. They use as further evidence his songs that advise the people to stay away from drugs.

== Legacy ==
At the age of 30, Darwish was hailed as the father of new Egyptian music and the hero of the renaissance of Arab music. Journalist and historian Samir Kassir credited Darwish specifically with having "brought in completely new orchestration" to Arab music, thereby modernizing the genre.

He is still very much alive in his works. His belief that music was not merely for entertainment but an expression of human aspiration imparted meaning to life. He is a composer remembered in street names, statues, a commemorative stamp, an Opera house, and a feature film. He dedicated his melodies to the Egyptian and pan-Arab struggle and, in the process, enriched Arab music in its entirety.

The Palestinian singer and musicologist, Reem Kelani, examined the role of Sayyid Darwish and his songs in her programme for BBC Radio Four entitled "Songs for Tahrir" about her experiences of music in the uprising in Egypt in 2011.

== Compositions ==
=== Egyptian national anthem ===
Darwish put music to the Egyptian national anthem, "Bilady, Bilady, Bilady", the words of which were adapted from a famous speech by Mustafa Kamil.

Coincidentally, on the day of his death, the national Egyptian leader Saad Zaghloul returned from exile; the Egyptians sang Darwish's new song "Mesrona watanna Saaduha Amalna", another national song by Sayed Darwish that was attributed to "Saad" and made especially to celebrate his return.

=== Salma ya Salama ===
Darwish composed music for Badi' Khayri's zajal, which commemorated the return of survivors of the Egyptian work force recruited by the British for the war effort. Many of these men had been deported to other countries, including France, Malta, Syria, and Palestine. "Salma ya Salama" (Welcome back to safety), with its nationalistic theme of longing for home, struck a chord with the majority of Egyptians; it became highly popular and was frequently performed throughout the country. This song quickly became a nationwide hit and was widely performed by everyone. This was just the beginning of an ever-changing repertory of Egyptian songs, which were widely heard and performed by Egyptians.

=== Notable songs ===
Original Title	Translation	Notable Performer(s)
Aho Da Elly Sar	That's What Happened	Fairuz; Ziad Rahbani; Ali El Haggar
Ana Ashe't	I Fell in Love	Zakaria Ahmed
Ana Hawet Wa Ntaheit	I Loved And I'm Done	Sayed Darwish; Mohamed Mohsen; Mohamed Abdel Wahab; Massar Egbari
El Bahr Byedhak Leh	Why Is The Sea Laughing	Mohamed Mohsen; Sheikh Imam
Bilady, Bilady, Bilady	My Country, My Country, My Country	Mohamed Abdel Wahab; Sherine
Al Bint Al Shalabiya	The Shalabiya Girl	Fairuz; Pink Martini
Bint Misr	The Egyptian Girl	Dick Dale & The Del-Tones; Enoch Light; The Beach Boys
Daya't Mustaqbal Hayaty	I Wasted The Future of My Life	Sayed Darwish; Zakaria Ahmed; Sabah Fakhri
Dinguy, Dinguy, Dinguy	---	Iman Bahr Darwish
Al Hashasheen	The Hashish Smokers	Sayed Darwish; Mohamed Mohsen
El Helwa Di	The Beautiful One	Fairuz; Ziad Rahbani; Marcel Khalife
Khafif Al Rouh	Lighthearted Soul	Iman Bahr Darwish; Salwa Al Katrib
Oumy Ya Misr	Wake Up Egypt	Mohamed Mohsen; Sheikh Imam; Abdel Halim Hafez
Salma Ya Salama	Go And Come in Peace	Sayed Darwish; Dalida; Ronza; Sofia Essaidi
Al Shaytan	The Devil	Issa Ghandour
Shed El Hezam	Fasten Your Belt	Sayed Darwish; Issa Ghandour; The Jets
Tol'it Ya Mahla Nouhra	Bright Lights	Fairuz; Dalida; The Jets
Ya Bahgat Al Rouh	Joy of My Soul	Sabah Fakhri
Ya Ward Ful Wa Yasmine	Jasmine Rose	Aida el Ayoubi
Zourouni	Visit Me Once A Year	Fairuz; Ziad Rahbani

== Arrangements of his compositions for classical string orchestra by (Amir Awad) ==
- Telet ya mahla Nourha
- Ya Bahget El Rouh
- Ya ward alla fol we yasmin
- Aho da elly Sar
- Ya shady el Alhan
- Bent El youm
- Bokra ya Benty
- Ma oltelaksh in el kotra

== Memorials ==
The Sayyid Darwish Theatre was named in his honor.

== See also ==
- Arabic music
- Middle Eastern music
- Misirlou
- Music of Egypt
