= Salam Affandina =

Former Egyptian national anthem

Salām Affandīnā
English: Greetings to our Lord
- سلام أفندينا
- Former national anthem of (Kingdom of Egypt) Egypt
- Also known as: السلام الجمهورى المصرى (English: Egyptian Republican Anthem)
- Music: Giuseppe Pugioli, 1871
- Adopted: 1871 (by the Khedivate of Egypt) 1914 (by the Sultanate of Egypt) 27 August 1936 (by the Kingdom of Egypt)
- Relinquished: 1958 (by the United Arab Republic)
- Succeeded by: "Wallāh Zamān, Yā Silāḥī"

Audio sample
- Performed by the Royal Australian Air Force Central Band in 1957, directed by Laurence Henry Hicks.: file; help

"Salam Affandina" and "Humat ad-Diyar", performed together as the anthem of the United Arab Republic between 1958 and 1960.

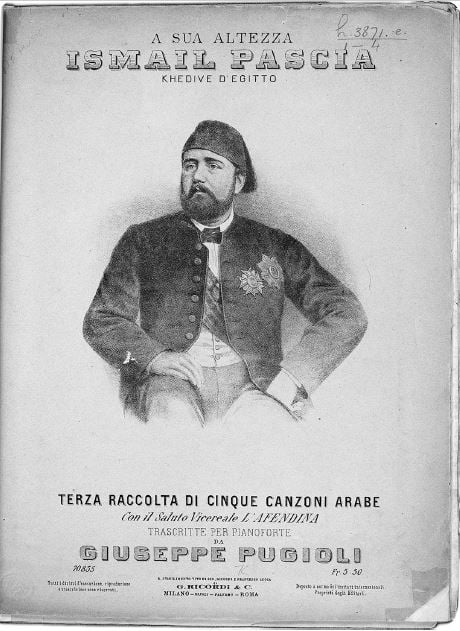
The sheet music with Italian titles in which the song was published.

"Salām Affandīnā" (Arabic: سلام أفندينا; lit. 'Salute of Our Lord') was the national anthem of Egypt from 1871 to 1922 and 1936–1952, then it was replaced by "Nashīd al-Ḥurriyya" (lit. 'Hymn of Freedom'). It was renamed "Egyptian Republican Anthem" (السلام الجمهورى المصرى, As-Salām al-Jamhūrī al-Maṣrī) in 1953 after the Egyptian revolution of 1952. It was instrumental and had no official lyrics.

== Usage elsewhere ==
=== Usage by the Coptic Orthodox Church ===
The melody for the anthem was adopted by the Coptic Orthodox Church for the Papal Hymn of "Kalos Akee" (Coptic: Ⲕⲁⲗⲟⲥ ⲁⲕⲓ̀ ϣⲁⲣⲟⲛ ⲙ̀ⲫⲟⲟⲩ). This hymn is chanted to welcome the Coptic Pope upon his return to the homeland from travel abroad. Originally, the hymn had no original or unique tone of its own, with each of its verses being sung in a tone recycled from one of the other hymns of the church. In the 20th century, Cantor Mikhail Girgis El Batanouny musically arranged the hymn to the tone of "Salam Affandina", which had been the Egyptian national anthem at the time.

=== Usage in Sephardic Synagogues ===
The melody of the song has been adopted by Sephardic Jews and is currently sung in Sephardic synagogues in Israel when the Torah Scroll is taken out of the ark.
