= Ibrahim Tuqan =

Palestinian poet (1905–1941)

- إبراهيم عبدالفتاح طوقان
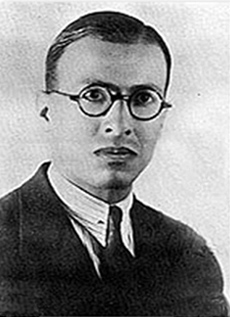
- 1935 portrait
- Born: 1905; Nablus, Beirut vilayet, Ottoman Empire
- Died: 2 May 1941 (aged 35–36); Jerusalem, Mandatory Palestine
- Occupations: Poet, college professor
- Children: Ja'afar Tuqan; Ureib Tuqan Al-Bukhari
- Relatives: Ahmad Toukan (brother); Fadwa Tuqan (sister)
- Writing career
- Period: 1923–1941
- Genre: Nationalist

Ibrahim Abd al-Fattah Tuqan (Note: Also romanized as Touqan or Toukan.) (Arabic: إبراهيم عبدالفتاح طوقان, romanized: Ibrāhīm ʿAbd al-Fattāḥ Ṭūqān; 1905 – 2 May 1941) was a Palestinian nationalist poet whose work rallied Arabs during their revolt against the British mandate. Tuqan was the brother of fellow poet Fadwa Tuqan, whom he tutored and influenced; the two belonged to the prominent Tuqan family that governed Nablus during the 18th and 19th centuries.

== Biography ==
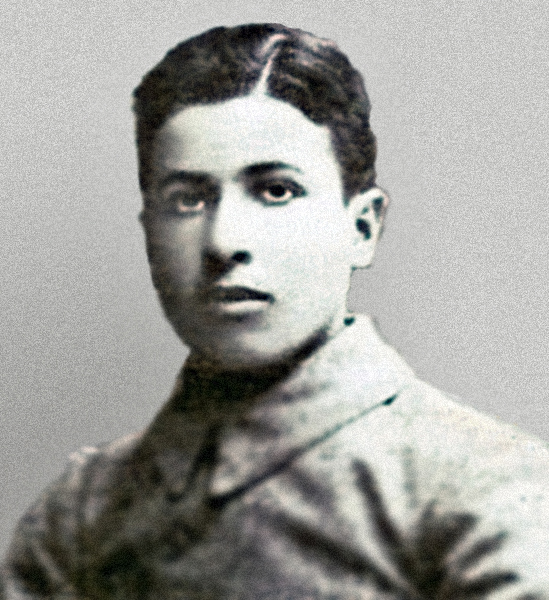
Tuqan at an early age

Tuqan was born in Nablus in 1905. He attended the al-Rashadiyya al-Gharbiyya School in western Nablus for his primary education, then St. George's School in Jerusalem for his secondary education. He continued his studies at the American University in Beirut from 1923 to 1929. After graduating with a bachelor's degree in literature, Tuqān worked as a professor of Arabic literature at An-Najah National University in Nablus. He spent one year in an-Najah University in 1929 when Palestine witnessed the massive uprising. This event influenced Tuqān to write nationalist poems. He later worked in two jobs as a professor at the American University in Beirut and a sub-director of the Arabic Programme Section of the Jerusalem-based Palestine Broadcasting Service.

In 1937, he married Sāmia ʿAbd al-Hādī, and they had one son, Jaʿfar, and one daughter, Ureib. Tuqān suffered from stomach problems throughout his life and in 1941 he died at the age of 36 from a peptic ulcer in the French Hospital in Jerusalem.

== Poetry ==
Tuqan's career as a poet began during his adolescence. He was greatly influenced by his grandfather who wrote zajal, as well as his mother, who was fond of "heroic" Arabic literature. As he was encouraged by his father, Tuqan was highly interested in Qur'an and used to read it every Ramadan. Tuqan published his first poem in 1923 while in Beirut. There, he found that the Lebanese press encouraged him greatly to publish his work. In 1923, Tuqan also published his first ode in Lebanon under the title al-Mumarridat or Mala’ikat al-rahma.

Most of his poems dealt with the Arab struggle against the British Mandate that controlled Palestine since 1922. His poems gained fame in the Arab world during the 1936–39 Arab revolt in Palestine. According to author Salma Khadra Jayyusi, Tuqan's poetry is marked by "sincerity and emotional veracity. His verse clear and direct, the diction simple and well-chosen, and the phrases powerful and often terse."

Here is an excerpt from one of his notable poems, Mawtini, which he wrote during the Arab revolt:

The sword and the pen

Not talking nor quarrelling

Are our symbols

Our glory and covenant

And a duty to fulfil it

Shake us

Our honour

Is an honourable cause

A raised flag

O, your beauty

In your eminence

Victorious over your enemies

My homeland

My homeland

The poem served as the de facto national anthem of Palestine until the country adopted an official one in 1996. In 2004, Iraq adopted the poem as its official national anthem. Many Palestinians still identify with "Mawtini" along with "Fida'i" and consider the former a sort of unofficial second national anthem of their country.

== See also ==
- List of notable people from Nablus
- List of Palestinians
