= Fadwa Tuqan =

Palestinian poet (1917–2003)

- فدوى طوقان
- Born: 1 March 1917; Nablus, Mandatory Palestine
- Died: 12 December 2003 (aged 86); Nablus, Palestine
- Occupation: Poet
- Relatives: Ahmad Toukan (brother); Ibrahim Tuqan (brother)

Fadwa Tuqan (Note: Also romanized as Fadwa Touqan, particularly in French.) (Arabic: فدوى طوقان, romanized: Fadwā Ṭūqān; 1 March 1917 – 12 December 2003) was a Palestinian poet known for her representations of resistance to Israeli occupation in contemporary Arab poetry. She has sometimes been referred to as the "Poet of Palestine".

== Life ==
Born in Nablus to the wealthy Palestinian Tuqan family known for their accomplishments in many fields, she received schooling until age 13 when she was forced to quit school at a young age due to illness. One of her brothers, Ibrahim Tuqan, known as the Poet of Palestine, took responsibility of educating her, gave her books to read and taught her English. He was also the one who introduced her to poetry. Tuqan eventually attended Oxford University, where she studied English and literature.

Fadwa Tuqan's eldest brother is Ahmad Toukan, former prime minister of Jordan.

Tuqan's poetry is known for her distinctive chronicling of the suffering of her people, the Palestinians, particularly those living under Israeli occupation. She contributed a Bahraini progressive journal, Sawt al-Bahrain, in the early 1950s.

Tuqan eventually published eight poetry collections, which were translated into many languages and enjoy renown throughout the Arab World. Her book, Alone With the Days, focused on the hardships faced by women in the male-dominated Arab world. After the Six-Day War, Tuqan's poetry focused on the hardships of living under the Israeli occupation. One of her best known poems, "The Night and the Horsemen," described life under Israeli military rule.

Tuqan died on 12 December 2003 during the height of the Al-Aqsa Intifada, while her hometown of Nablus was under siege. The poem Wahsha: Moustalhama min Qanoon al Jathibiya (Longing: Inspired by the Law of Gravity) was one of the last poems she penned while largely bedridden.

Tuqan is widely considered a symbol of the Palestinian cause and "one of the most distinguished figures of modern Arabic literature." Her poetry is set by Mohammed Fairouz in his Third Symphony.

== Bibliography ==
- My Brother Ibrahim (1946)
- Alone With The Days (1952)
- I Found It (1957)
- Give Us Love (1960)
- In Front Of A Closed Door (1967)
- The Night And the Horsemen (1969)
- Alone On the Summit Of The World (1973)
- July And The Other Thing (1989)
- The Last Melody (2000)
- Longing Inspired by the Law of Gravity (2003)
- Tuqan, Fadwa: An autobiography: A Mountainous Journey, Graywolf Press, Saint Paul, Minnesota, U.S.A. (1990), ISBN 1-55597-138-5, with part two published in 1993
