= Ahmad Toukan =

Jordanian politician (1903–1981)

Ahmad Tuqan
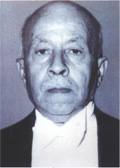
- Official portrait from 1960

Prime Minister of Jordan
- In office 26 September 1970 – 28 October 1970
- Monarch: King Hussein
- Preceded by: Mohammad Daoud Al-Abbasi
- Succeeded by: Wasfi al-Tal

Personal details
- Born: 15 August 1903 Nablus, Beirut vilayet, Ottoman Empire
- Died: 5 January 1981 (aged 77) Amman, Jordan
- Citizenship: Jordanian
- Party: Independent
- Education: BSc Engineering Sciences, American University of Beirut, 1925.
- Profession: Lawyer and politician

Ahmad Toukan (Note: Also romanized as Ahmad Tuqan.) (Arabic: أحمد طوقان, romanized: Aḥmad Ṭūqān; 15 August 1903 – 5 January 1981) was a former Prime Minister of Jordan, died in early 1981 at the age of 78 after a prolonged illness, according to a spokesman cited by The New York Times. He served as Prime Minister in 1970, during a period of military operations that led to the expulsion of the PLO guerrilla's Palestinian fighters from Jordan.

== Life ==
Tuqan was born in Nablus, then part of the Ottoman Empire. He was the eldest brother of Ibrahim Touqan and Fadwa Touqan, both of whom were poets.

He was on the staff of the Arab College in Palestine during the British Mandatory period.

He died in Jordan on 5 January 1981, aged 77, after a prolonged illness. The Ahmad Toukan School in Amman is named in his honor.

== Education and career ==
- BSc Engineering Sciences, American University of Beirut, 1925.
- MSc Physics, University of Oxford, 1929.

Toukan occupied the following high-ranking positions:

- UNESCO Expert and UNRWA Deputy Head of Education (1954–1961
- Education Expert at the International Bank for Reconstruction & Development (1962–1966)
- Minister (including Foreign Minister, Minister of State and Deputy Prime Minister during the years 1950–1970)
- Prime Minister in 1970
- Chief of the Royal Hashemite Court of Jordan in 1972
- Chairman of University of Jordan's Board of Trustees in 1972.

== See also ==
- List of prime ministers of Jordan
- Politics of Jordan
- Black September
- King Hussein of Jordan
- University of Jordan

Political offices
Preceded by Mohammad Daoud Al-Abbasi	Prime Minister of Jordan; 1970	Succeeded by Wasfi al-Tal
