= Walid Gholmieh =

Lebanese conductor and composer (1938–2011)

- وليد جرجس غلمية
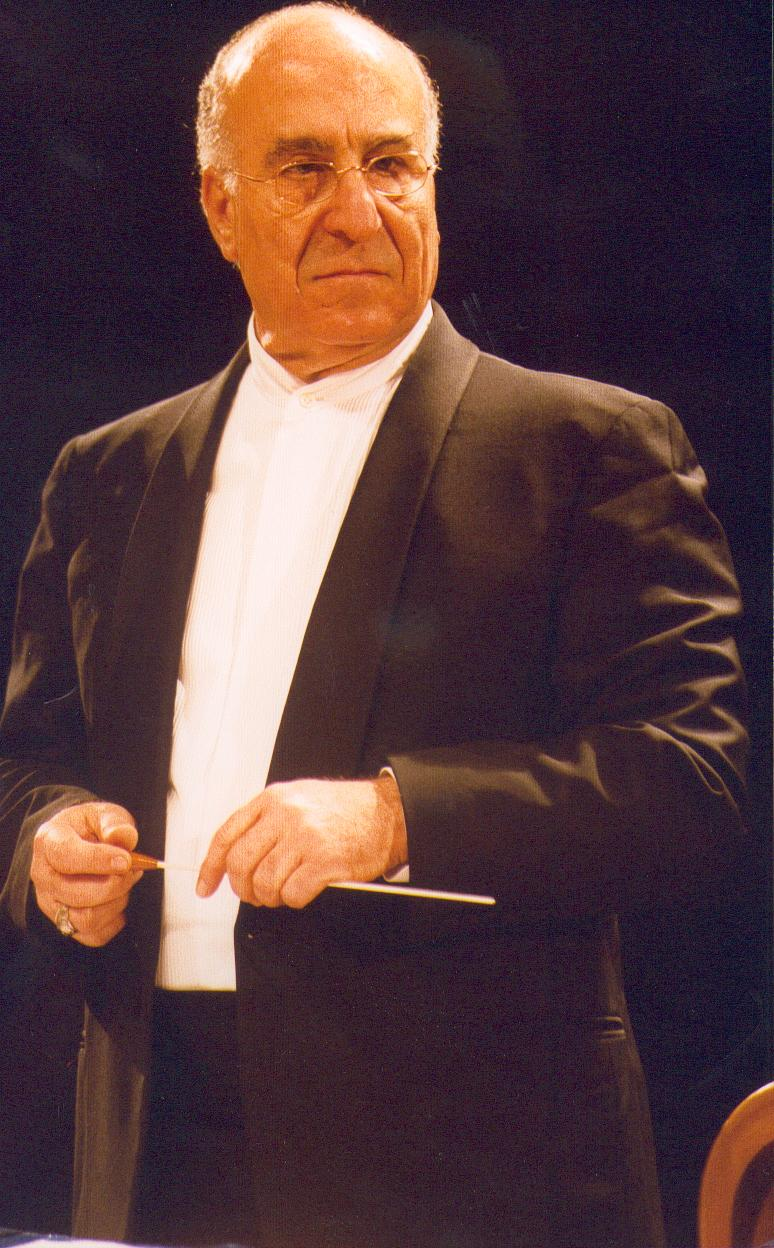
- Gholmieh in 2005.
- Born: Walid Georges Gholmieh; 1938; Marjeyoun, French Lebanon
- Died: 7 June 2011 (aged 72–73); Beirut, Lebanon
- Occupations: Composer, conductor
- Notable work: Ardulfurataini

Walid Georges Gholmieh (Arabic: وليد جرجس غلمية; 1938 – 7 June 2011) was a Lebanese conductor and composer. He was the director of the Le Conservatoire libanais national supérieur de musique or The Lebanese National Higher Conservatory of Music. He was considered one of the most prominent Middle Eastern conductors and composers.

== Life and career ==
Born in Marjeyoun, Lebanon, Gholmieh initially studied Mathematics at the American University of Beirut before dedicating his education and life to music.

He was the founder of both the Lebanese National Symphony Orchestra and the Lebanese National Arabic Oriental Orchestra.

Established in 2000, the Lebanese National Symphony Orchestra, under the leadership of Gholmieh, was able to prove itself both locally and regionally. In a period of 25 months, the Orchestra presented more than 60 performances in different cities, including a varied international repertoire by classical music composers. On August 2, 2002, Gholmieh led the Lebanese National Symphony Orchestra at the Baalbeck International Festival.

On April 17, 2006, Gholmieh led the Lebanese National Orchestra for Oriental Arabic Music in a captivating evening of Arabic music classics at the Abu Dhabi Music & Arts Foundation annual festival. He also headed the panel of judges on the Lebanese television talent show "Studio el Fan," which is credited for launching the careers of many Lebanese and Arab artists from 1972 to 2002.

Gholmieh composed the former Iraqi national anthem, "Ardulfurataini Watan" (English: Land of Euphrates) that was in use from 1981 until 2003. Gholmieh was featured on 'Plastic Beach', an album from Damon Albarn's virtual band, Gorillaz. The album was released on March 9, 2010.

== Death ==
Gholmieh died in Beirut, Lebanon, on 7 June 2011 after a long illness.

== Awards and prizes ==
- Peter and Paul (Medal) (exclusive medal)
- Chevalier de l’Ordre National du Cèdre (Lebanon)

== Academic Record ==
- MFA: Conducting
- MFA: Composition
- Doctorate: Musicology.

== Compositions ==
=== Symphonies ===
- 1st Symphony: C. Major (Al Qadissiya) “The Symphony of Faith”
- 2nd Symphony: B.Flat Major (Al Mutanabbi) “The Symphony of Will”
- 3rd Symphony: G. Major (Al Yarmouk) “The Symphony of Freedom”
- 4th Symphony: E. Flat Major (Al Chahid- the martyr) “The Symphony of Devotion”
- 5th Symphony: G. Major (Al Mawakeb- the processions) “dedicated to Jibran Khalil Jibran”
- 6th Symphony: (Al Fajr– The Dawn). Dedicated to Antoun Saadeh's 100th anniversary.

=== Musical compositions for theater ===
- “ Majdaloun” - Director Roger Assaf
- “O’rob Ma Yali” - Director Yaacoub Chedraoui
- “Al- Sitara” - Director Michel Nabaa
- “Mikhael Neihmé” - Director Yaacoub Chedraoui
- “Charbel” - Director Raymond Jebara
- “Al-Tartour” - Director Yaacoub Chedraoui
- “Bala laeb ya wlad” - Director Yaacoub Chedraoui
- “Ya Iskandaria Bahrek Ajayeb”- Director Yaacoub Chedraoui
- Caracalla Dance group. (Several programs).

=== Musical compositions for Cinema ===
- “Secret of life” - documentary - Director Hikmat Saba
- “The South” - documentary- Director Samir Nasri
- “Kingdom of the poor” - feature - Director Phillip Akiki
- “Passport to Oblivion” - feature - Director David Nevin- MGM.
- “Mawal” - feature - Director Mohammed Salman
- “Kafarqassem”- feature - Director Burhan Alawiyya.
- “Beirut Ya Beirut” - feature - Director Maroun Baghdadi
- “Al- Qadissiya”- feature - Director Salah Abu Seif
- Educational films for the United Nations.

=== Program music ===
- ”Marjeyoun”
- “Beirut”
- “Maraya El-Hanin” ( the life story of the well-known writer Mikhael Naimi)
- “أنا الألف” (Ana Al Alifu) first pedagogical concerning the Arabic Alphabet.
- Birthstone
- Ethereal

== Discography & Publications ==
- Odessey “the green train” - 2 hours and 20 minutes- 1st canto - epic in the history of the Lebanese and Arabic music, published by Philips International company.
- ”Marjeyoun” - published by Philips International company and Polydisc company
- “Beirut”- published by Philips International company and Polydisc company
- “Maraya El-Hanin” (the life story of the well-known writer Mikhael Naimi)- published by Philips International company and Polydisc company.
- “أنا الألف” (Ana Al Alifu) first pedagogical concerning the Arabic Alphabet.
- Birthstone- published by Polydisc.
- Ethereal- published by Polydisc.
- 1st Symphony: C. Major (Al Qadissiya) “The Symphony of Faith” published by Philips International company and Polydisc company
- 2nd Symphony: B.Flat Major (Al Mutanabbi) “The Symphony of Will” published by Philips International company and Polydisc company
- 3rd Symphony: G. Major (Al Yarmouk) “The Symphony of Freedom” published by Philips International company and Polydisc company.
- 4th Symphony: E. Flat Major (Al Chahid- the martyr) “The Symphony of Devotion” published by Philips International company and Polydisc company.
- 5th Symphony: G. Major (Al Mawakeb- the processions) “dedicated to Jibran Khalil Jibran” published by Philips Records company and Polydisc company.
- 6th Symphony: “Al Fajr-dedicated for Antun Saade” (The Dawn).

The first five Symphonies were digitally recorded with the Ukraine National Symphony Orchestra under the BATON of Vladimir Cyrenko in the year 2005. While the sixth was recorded in Slovenia.

=== Research, Treateses ===
- On the Lebanese music
- On the Syrian music
- On the Libyan music, (Ministry of Culture of Libya from 1965 to 1968)
- On the Iraqi music, (Iraqi Ministry of Culture from 1975 to 1985).
