= Mawtini =

Arabic poem and patriotic song

Mawṭinī
English: 'My Homeland'
- موطني
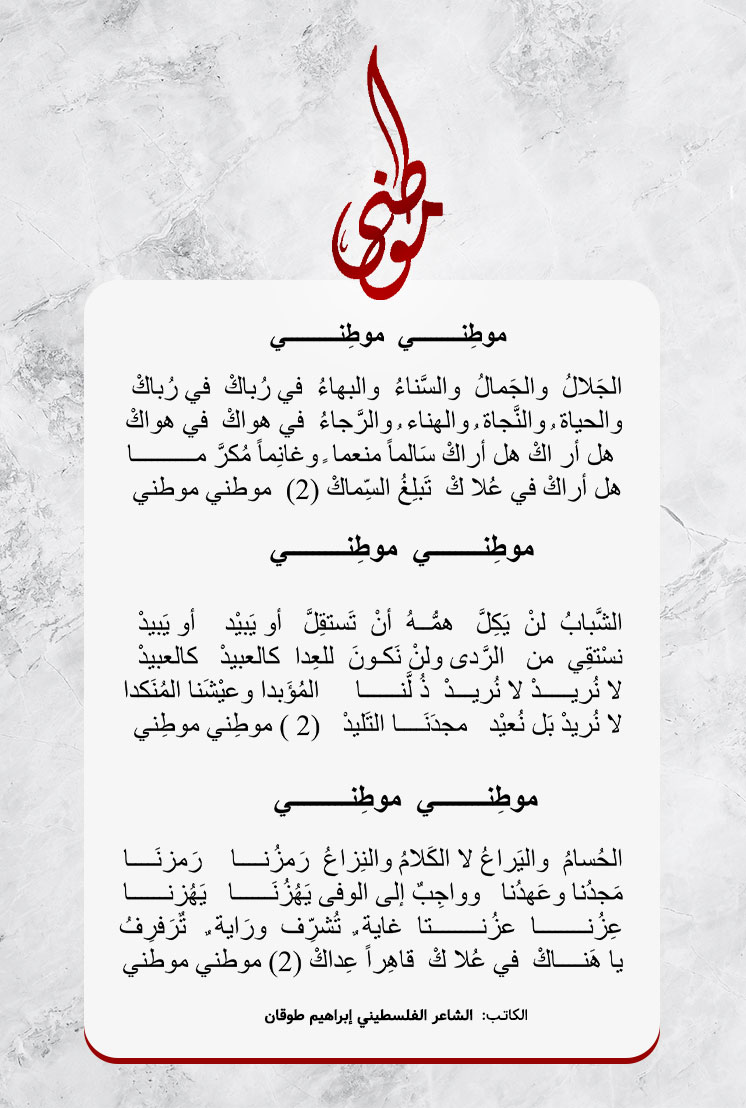
- Arabic lyrics of the poem
- Former national anthem of Palestine; National anthem of Iraq
- Lyrics: Ibrahim Tuqan, 1934
- Music: Mohammed Flayfel, 1934
- Adopted: 1936 (by Palestine); November 2004 (by Iraq)
- Relinquished: 1996 (by Palestine)
- Preceded by: "Mawtini" (Iraq)
- Succeeded by: "Fida'i" (Palestine)

Audio sample
- U.S. Navy Band instrumental rendition (two verses) in A-flat major: file; help

"Mawṭinī" (/ˈmɔːtɪni/ MAW-tin-ee; Arabic: موطني, lit. 'My Homeland') is an Arabic national poem by the Palestinian poet Ibrahim Tuqan, composed by the Lebanese musician Mohammed Flayfel in 1934, and is a popular patriotic song among the Arab people, and the official national anthem of Iraq.

Mawtini was adopted as Iraq's national anthem in 2004. The song formerly served as an unofficial anthem of Palestinians and other peoples of the Middle East for much of the 20th century. In 1936, Palestine formally adopted it as the official national anthem. Though it has since been superseded by an official national anthem there, many Palestinians still identify strongly with it and consider it a secondary national anthem of their country. It is considered one of the Arab national anthems, including since 2004 where it was the national anthem of Iraq.

Mawtini has been described as a reflection of the shared experiences and struggles of Arab peoples, evoking strong emotions tied to national pride, hardship, and the aspiration for freedom. It is regarded as a symbol of resistance and a representation of the collective longing for liberation during periods of occupation and oppression. The anthem conveys emotions such as sorrow, anger, and hope, fostering a sense of renewal and solidarity among those who have endured similar adversities. Its lyrics express a deep love for the homeland, a commitment to its liberation, and a vision of a united and free nation. This message resonates widely across the Arab world, reflecting the shared struggles for independence, identity, and sovereignty.

Many Arab artists have re-sung the anthem with new distributions, such as Elissa, Christina Sawaya, and Faia Younan in a video clip that depicted the Syrian civil war.

== History ==
U.S. military band performing "Mawtini" in 2009

It is a popular poem written by the Palestinian poet ʾIbrāhīm Ṭūqān c. 1934 and composed by the Lebanese composer Muḥammid Flayfil. It served as Palestine's de facto national anthem from its inception to 1996 when it was officially replaced by "Fidā'ī". However, many Palestinians still identify with it along with "Fida'i" and consider the former a sort of unofficial second national anthem of their country.

In 2004, it was re-adopted as a national anthem, this time by Iraq, on the order of Coalition Provisional Authority chief Paul Bremer as the national anthem of Iraq. It replaced "Mawṭinī" (of no relation to the current national anthem), which in turn replaced the old national anthem "Arḍulfurātayni", which had been in use since 1981 and was thus associated with Saddam Hussein's Ba'athist regime.

=== Background ===
During the late 1950s and early 1960s, after it became a republic, Iraq used a national anthem also called "Mawṭinī", composed by Lewis Zanbaka. Though it shares the same name as the current Iraqi national anthem, it is a different song altogether. Unlike the current Iraqi national anthem, this version is instrumental and has no lyrics.

After Iraq's Ba'athist regime was deposed in 2003, the old "Mawṭinī" formerly used as the Iraqi national anthem during the late 1950s and early 1960s was brought back and used temporarily as an interim national anthem until it was replaced by the current "Mawṭinī" in 2004.

== Lyrics ==
Arabic original

١
مَوْطِنِي مَوْطِنِي
اَلْجَلَالُ وَالْجَمَالُ وَالسَّنَاءُ وَالْبَهَاءُ
فِي رُبَاكْ فِي رُبَاكْ
وَالْحَيَاةُ وَالنَّجَاةُ وَالْهَنَاءُ وَالرَّجَاءُ
فِي هَوَاكْ فِي هَوَاكْ
هَلْ أَرَاكْ هَلْ أَرَاكْ
𝄇 سَالِمًا مُنَعَّمًا وَغَانِمًا مُكَرَّمًا 𝄆
هَلْ أَرَاكْ فِي عُلَاكْ
تَبْلُغُ السِّمَاكْ تَبْلُغُ السِّمَاكْ
مَوْطِنِي مَوْطِنِي

٢
مَوْطِنِي مَوْطِنِي
اَلشَّبَابُ لَنْ يَكِلَّ هَمُّهُ أَنْ يَسْتَقِلَّ (Note: Sometimes written تَسْتَقِلَّ tastaqilla [tæs.tɑ.qɪl.læ], the second-person (addressing the homeland) instead of third-person form.)
أَوْ يَبِيدْ أَوْ يَبِيدْ
نَسْتَقِي مِنَ الرَّدَىٰ وَلَنْ نَكُونَ لِلْعِدَىٰ
كَالْعَبِيدْ كَالْعَبِيدْ
لَا نُرِيدْ لَا نُرِيدْ
𝄇 ذُلَّنَا الْمُؤَبَّدَا وَعَيْشَنَا الْمُنَكَّدَا 𝄆 (Note: ذِلُّنَا Ḏillunā [ðɪl.lʊ.næː] is also used.)
لَا نُرِيدْ بَلْ نُعِيدْ
مَجْدَنَا التَّلِيدْ مَجْدَنَا التَّلِيدْ
مَوْطِنِي مَوْطِنِي

٣
مَوْطِنِي مَوْطِنِي
اَلْحُسَامُ وَ الْيَرَاعُ لَا الْكَلَامُ وَالنِّزَاعُ
رَمْزُنَا رَمْزُنَا
مَجْدُنَا وَ عَهْدُنَا وَوَاجِبٌ مِنَ الْوَفَاء
يَهُزُّنَا يَهُزُّنَا
عِزُّنَا عِزُّنَا
𝄇 غَايَةٌ تُشَرِّفُ وَرَايَةٌ تُرَفْرِفُ 𝄆
يَا هَنَاكْ فِي عُلَاكْ
قَاهِرًا عِدَاكْ قَاهِرًا عِدَاكْ
مَوْطِنِي مَوطِنِي

Romanization of Arabic

I
Mawṭinī, mawṭinī
Al-jalālu wa-l-jamālu wa-s-sanāʾu wa-l-bahāʾu
Fī rubāk, fī rubāk
Wa-l-ḥayātu wa-n-najātu wa-l-hanāʾu wa-r-rajāʾu
Fī hawāk, fī hawāk
Hal ʾarāk, hal ʾarāk
𝄆 Sāliman munaʿʿaman wa-ġāniman mukarraman 𝄇
Hal ʾarāk fī ʿulāk
Tabluġu s-simāk, tabluġu s-simāk
Mawṭinī, mawṭinī.

II
Mawṭinī, mawṭinī
Aš-šabābu lan yakilla hammuhu ʾan yastaqilla
ʾAw yabīd, ʾaw yabīd
Nastaqī mina r-radā wa-lan nakūna li-l-ʿidāʾ
Ka-l-ʿabīd, ka-l-ʿabīd
Lā nurīd, lā nurīd
𝄆 Ḏullanā l-muʾabbada wa-ʿayšanā l-munakkadā 𝄇
Lā nurīd, bal nuʿīd
Majdanā t-talīd, majdanā t-talīd
Mawṭinī, mawṭinī.

III
Mawṭinī, mawṭinī
Al-ḥusāmu wa-l-yarāʿu lā l-kalāmu wa-n-nizāʿu
Ramzunā, ramzunā
Majdunā wa-ʿahdunā wa-wājibun mina l-wafāʾ
Yahuzzunā, yahuzzunā
ʿIzzunā, ʿizzunā
𝄆 Ġāyatun tušarrifu wa-rāyatun turafrifu 𝄇
Yā hanāk, fī ʿulāk
Qāhiran ʿidāk, qāhiran ʿidāk
Mawṭinī, mawṭinī.

IPA transcription (Note: See Help:IPA/Arabic and Arabic phonology.)

1
[mɑwtˤɪniː mɑwtˤɪniː]
[æld͡ʒælæːlʊ wæ‿ld͡ʒæmæːlʊ wæ‿ssænæːʔʊ wæ‿lbæhæːʔʊ]
[fɪː rʊbæːk fɪː rʊbæːk]
[wæ‿lħɑjæːtʊ wæ‿nnæd͡ʒæːtʊ wæ‿lhænæːʔʊ wɑ‿rrɑd͡ʒæːʔʊ]
[fiː hæwæːk fiː hæwæːk]
[hæl ʔɑrɑːk hæl ʔɑrɑːk]
𝄆 [sæːlimæn mʊnɑʕʕɑmæn wɑ ɣæːnimæn mʊkɑrrɑmæn] 𝄇
[hæl ʔɑrɑːk fiː ʕʊlæːk]
[tæblʊɣu‿ssimæːk tæblʊɣu‿ssimæːk]
[mɑwtˤɪniː mɑwtˤɪniː]

2
[mɑwtˤɪniː mɑwtˤɪniː]
[æʃʃæbæːbʊ læn jækɪllæ hæmmʊhu ʔæn jæstɑqɪllæ]
[ʔɑw jæbiːd ʔɑw jæbiːd]
[næstɑqɪː minæ‿rrɑdæː wɑ læn nækuːnæ lɪ‿lʕɪdæːʔ]
[kæ‿lʕɑbiːd kæ‿lʕɑbiːd]
[læː nʊriːd læː nʊriːd]
𝄆 [ðʊllænæː‿lmuʔæbbædæ wɑ ʕɑjʃænæː‿lmʊnækkædæː] 𝄇
[læː nʊriːd bæːl nʊʕiːd]
[mæd͡ʒdænæː‿ttæliːd mæd͡ʒdænæː‿ttæliːd]
[mɑwtˤɪniː mɑwtˤɪniː]

3
[mɑwtˤɪniː mɑwtˤɪniː]
[ælħʊsæːmʊ wæ‿ljɑrɑːʕʊ læː‿lkælæːmʊ wæ‿nnizɑːʕʊ]
[rɑmzʊnæː rɑmzʊnæː]
[mæd͡ʒdʊnæː wɑ ʕɑhdʊnæː wɑ wæːd͡ʒibʊn minæ‿lwɑfæːʔ]
[jæhʊzzʊnæː jæhʊzzʊnæː]
[ʕɪzzʊnnæː ʕɪzzʊnnæː]
𝄆 [ɣɑːjætʊn tʊʃɑrrɪfu wɑ rɑːjætʊn tʊrɑfrɪfʊ] 𝄇
[jæː hænæːk fiː ʕʊlæːk]
[qɑːhɪrɑn ʕɪdæːk qɑːhɪrɑn ʕɪdæːk]
[mɑwtˤɪniː mɑwtˤɪniː]

English translation

I
My homeland, my homeland,
Glory and beauty, sublimity and splendour
Are in thy hills, are in thy hills.
Life and deliverance, pleasure and hope
Are in thine air, are in thine air.
Will I see thee, will I see thee?
𝄆 Safely comforted and victoriously honoured. 𝄇
Will I see thee in thine eminence?
Reaching to the stars, reaching to the stars
My homeland, my homeland.

II
My homeland, my homeland,
The youth shall not tire, their goal is thine independence
Or they die, or they die.
We shall drink from death, and shall not be to our enemies
Like slaves, like slaves.
We want not, we want not
𝄆 An eternal humiliation, nor a miserable life. 𝄇
We want not, but we shall bring back
Our storied glory, our storied glory.
My homeland, my homeland.

III
My homeland, my homeland,
The sword and the pen, not the talk nor the quarrel
Are our symbols, are our symbols.
Our glory and our covenant, and a faithful duty
Moveth us, moveth us.
Our glory, our glory,
𝄆 Is an honourable cause, and a waving flag. 𝄇
O, behold thee, in thine eminence,
Victorious over thy foes, victorious over thy foes.
My homeland, my homeland!

== See also ==
- "as-Salām al-Malakī", the former Iraqi national anthem, used from 1932 to 1958.
- "ʾArḍu l-Furātayni", the former Iraqi national anthem, used from 1981 to 2003.
- "Humat ad-Diyar", the national anthem of Syria, also composed by Mohammed Flayfel.
