= Shafiq al-Kamali =

Iraqi poet

Shafiq Abdul Jabbar Qaddouri al-Kamali شفيق عبد الجبار قدوري الكمالي

Personal details
- Born: 1929 Al-Bukamal, State of Syria
- Died: 1984 (aged 54–55) Baghdad
- Party: Ba'ath Party

Military service
- Allegiance: Ba'athist Iraq

Shafiq bin Abdul Jabbar bin Qaddouri al-Kamali (1929 - 1984) was an Iraqi poet and politician associated with the Ba'ath Party.

== Life ==
He was originally from Anah, and was born in the Syrian city of Al-Bukamal, near the Iraq border. He spent his early years there before moving to Baghdad, where he completed his primary and secondary education. He graduated from the College of Arts at University of Baghdad, then moved to Cairo to obtain a master's degree from the Faculty of Arts at Cairo University.

Due to his political activities opposing the monarchy in Iraq, he was dismissed from his job and imprisoned until the declaration of the Iraqi Republic. Following political disagreements, he moved between Syria and Egypt, and after the Iraqi Ba'ath Party assumed power, he returned and was appointed to the Ministry of Guidance. He held several ministerial positions in Iraq, including the Ministry of Information and the Ministry of Youth. He also chaired literary associations at the national and Arab levels and founded "Afaaq Arabia" publishing house. He died in Iraq in 1984.
