= Arḍulfurātayni =

1981–2003 national anthem of Iraq

Arḍu l-Furātayni
English: Land of the Two Rivers
- أرض الفراتين
- Former national anthem of Iraq
- Also known as: "Arḍulfurātayni Waṭan" "Arḍulfurātayni"
- Lyrics: Shafiq al-Kamali
- Music: Walid Georges Gholmieh, 1981
- Adopted: 17 July 1981
- Relinquished: 9 April 2003
- Preceded by: "Walla Zaman Ya Selahy"
- Succeeded by: "Mawtini"

Audio sample
- Full vocal version: file; help

"Land of the Two Rivers" (Arabic: أرض الفراتين, romanized: Arḍu l-Furātayni), also translated as the "Land of the Euphrates", was the national anthem of Iraq from 1981 to 2003, during the Ba'athist regime of Saddam Hussein.

== History ==
1983 performance

1985 performance

It was adopted in 1981, written by Shafiq al-Kamali (who died in 1984) with music by Walid Georges Gholmieh.

The lyrics make mention of important people in Iraqi history, such as Saladin, Harun al-Rashid, and al-Muthanna ibn Haritha, and heavily emphasize Arab nationalism, while the last verse extols Ba'athism. The latter two were largely seen as the main factors for the relinquishment of the anthem following the De-Ba'athification policy.

In shortened performances, the chorus was played twice, preceded by an instrumental introduction. Other abridged performances had the chorus twice, then the first verse once, concluding with the chorus performed twice. In full performances, the chorus was sung first twice, then each verse once with the chorus repeated twice in between, then the chorus sung again twice at the end.

After the ousting of Saddam Hussein's Ba'athist regime in 2003, the former national anthem of Iraq from the late 1950s and early 1960s, "Mawtini" (not to be confused with the current Iraqi national anthem of the same name) was reintroduced on a provisional basis. That was replaced in 2004 by the new Iraqi government with a new national anthem, also called "Mawtini", which is currently in use today.

== Lyrics ==
Arabic original

كُورَال:
𝄇 وَطَنٌ مَدَّ عَلَى الْأُفْقِ جَنَاحَا
وَارْتَدٰى مَجْدَ الْحَضَارَاتِ وِشَاحَا
بُورِكَتْ أَرْضُ الْفُرَاتَيْنِ وَطَن
عَبْقَرِي اَلْمَجْدِ عَزْمًا وَسَمَاحَا 𝄆

𝄇 هٰذِهِ الْأَرْضُ لَهِيبٌ وَسَنَا
وَشُمُوخٌ لَا تُدَانِيهِ سَمَا 𝄆
جَبَلٌ يَسْمُو عَلَى هَامِ الْدُّنَا
وَسُهُولٌ جَسَّدَتْ فِينَا الْإِبَا
بَابِلُ فِينَا وَآشُورُ لَنَا
وَبِنَا الْتَّارِيخُ يَخْضَلُّ ضِيَا
نَحْنُ فِي الْنَّاسِ جَمْعَنَا وَحْدَنَا
غَضْبَةَ الْسَّيْفِ وَحِلْم اَلْأَنْبِيَاء
𝄇 حِينَ أَوْقَدْنَا رِمَال اَلْعُرْبِ ثَوْرَة
وَحَمَلْنَا رَايَةَ الْتَّحْرِيرِ فِكْرَة 𝄆
مُنْذُ أَنْ لَزَّ مُثَنَّى الْخَيْلِ مُهْره
وَصَلَاحُ الْدِّينِ غَطَاهَا رِمَاحَا

كُورَال

𝄇 قَسَمًا بِالْسَّيْفِ وَالْقَوْلِ الْأَبِي
وَصَهِيلِ الْخَيْلِ عِنْدَ الْطَّلَبِ 𝄆
إِنَّنَا سُورُ مَدَاهَا الْأَرْحَبِ
وَهَدِيرُ الْشَّعْبَ يَوْم اَلنُّوَّبِ
أَوْرَثَتْنَا الْبِيدُ رَايَات اَلْنَّبِي
وَالْسَّجَايَا وَالْشُّمُوخ اَلْيَعْرُبِي
مَجِّدِي، جَذْلَى، بِلَادَ الْعَرَبِ
نَحْنُ أَشْرَقْنَا فَيَا شَمْس أُغْرُبِي
𝄇 اَلْجِبَاهُ الْسُّمْرُ بِشْرٌ وَمَحَبَّة
وَصُمُودٌ شَقَّ لِلْإِنْسَانِ دَرْبَه 𝄆
أَيُّهَا الْقَائِدُ لِلْعَلْيَاءِ شَعْبَه
اِجْعَلِ الآفَاقَ لِلْصَّوْلَاتِ سَاحَة

كُورَال

𝄇 يَا سَرَايَا الْبَعْثِ يَا أُسْدَ الْعَرِين
يَا شُمُوخ اَلْعِزِّ وَالْمَجْدِ الْتَّلِيد 𝄆
اِزْحَفِي كَالْهَوْلِ لِلْنَّصْرِ الْمُبِين
وَبَعْثِي فِي أَرْضِنَا عَهْد اَلْرَّشِيد
نَحْنُ جِيلُ الْبَذِل فَجْرُ الْكَادِحِين
يَا رِحَاب اَلْمَجْدِ عُدْنَا مِنْ جَدِيد
أُمَّةً تَبْنِي بِعَزْمٍ لَا يَلِين
وَشَهِيدٍ يَقْتَفِي خَطْوَ شَهِيد
𝄇 شَعْبُنَا الْجَبَّارُ زَهْوٌ وَانْطِلَاق
وَقِلَاعُ الْعِزِّ يَبْنِيهَا الْرِّفَاق 𝄆
دُمْتَ لِلْعُرْبِ مَلَاذًا يَا عِرَاق
وَشُمُوسًا تَجْعَلُ الْلَّيْلَ صَبَاحَا

كُورَال

Romanization of Arabic

Kūrāl:
𝄆 Waṭanun madda ʿalā l-ufqi janāḥā,
Wa-rtadā majda l-ḥaḍārāti wišāḥā,
Būrikat ʾarḍu l-Furātayni waṭan,
ʿAbqarī al-majdi ʿazman wa-samāḥā. 𝄇

𝄆 Hāḏihi l-ʾarḍu lahībun wa-sanā
Wa-šumūxun lā tudānīhi samā 𝄇
Jabalun yasmū ʿalā hāmi d-dunā
Wa-suhūlun jassadat fīnā l-ʾibā
Bābilu fīnā wa-ʾĀšūru lanā
Wa-binā t-tārīxu yaxḍallu ḍiyā
Naḥnu fī n-nāsi jamʿanā waḥdanā
Ġaḍbata s-sayfi wa-ḥilm al-ʾanbiyāʾ
𝄆 Ḥīna ʾawqadnā rimāl al-ʿurbi ṯawra
Wa-ḥamalnā rāyata t-taḥrīri fikra 𝄇
Munḏu ʾan lazza Muṯannā l-xayli muhra
Wa-Ṣalāḥu-d-Dīni ġaṭā-hā rimāḥā

Kūrāl

𝄆 Qasaman bi-s-sayfi wa-l-qawli l-ʾabī
Wa-ṣahīli l-xayli ʿinda ṭ-ṭalabi 𝄇
Innanā sūru madā-hā l-ʾarḥabi
Wa-hadīru š-šaʿba yawm an-nuwwabi
ʾAwraṯatnā l-bīdu rāyāt an-nabī
Wa-s-sajāyā wa-š-šumūx al-yaʿrubī
Majjidī, jaḏlā, bilāda l-ʿarabi
Naḥnu ʾašraqnā fa-yā šams ʾuġrubī
𝄆 Al-jibāhu s-sumru bišrun wa-maḥabba
Wa-ṣumūdun šaqqa li-l-ʾinsāni darba 𝄇
ʾAyyuhā l-qāʾidu li-l-ʿalyāʾi šaʿba
Ijʿali l-ʾāfāqa li-ṣ-ṣawlāti sāḥa

Kūrāl

𝄆 Yā sarāyā l-baʿṯi yā ʾusda l-ʿarīn
Yā šumūx al-ʿizzi wa-l-majdi t-talīd 𝄇
Izḥafī ka-l-hawli li-n-naṣri l-mubīn
Wa-baʿṯī fī ʾarḍinā ʿahd ar-Rašīd
Naḥnu jīlu l-baḏil, fajru l-kadiḥīn
Yā riḥāb al-majdi ʿudnā min jadīd
ʾUmmatan tabnī bi-ʿazmin lā yalīn
Wa-šahīdin yaqtafī xaṭwa šahīd
𝄆 Šaʿbunā l-jabbāru zahwun wa-nṭilāq
Wa-qilāʿu l-ʿizzi yabnīhā r-rifāq 𝄇
Dumta li-l-ʿurbi malāḏan, yā ʿIrāq
Wa-šumūsan tajʿalu l-layla ṣabāḥā

Kūrāl

IPA transcription (Note: See the Arabic pronunciation key and Mesopotamian Arabic.)

Kūraːl
[wɑː.tˤɑ.nun mæd.dɑ ʕæ.læː l.ʊf.qi d͡ʒæ.næː.ħɑː]
[wɑːr.tæ.dɑː mæd͡ʒ.dæ l.ħæ.ðˤɑː.ɾɑː.ti wɪ.ʃæː.ħɑː]
[buː.ɾɪ.kæt ɑɾ.ðˤʊ l.fʊ.ɾɑː.tæj.ni wɑː.tˤɑn]
[ʕæb.qæ.ɾiː.jʊ l.mæd͡ʒ.dɪ ʕæz.mæn wɑː sæ.mæː.ħɑː]

𝄆 [hæː.ðɪ.hi l.ɑɾ.ðˤʊ læ.hiː.bʊn wɑː sæ.næː]
[wɑː ʃʊ.muː.xʊn læː tʊ.ðˤɑː.niː.hi sæ.mæː] 𝄇
[d͡ʒæ.bæ.lʊn jæz.muː ʕæ.læː hæː.mi d.dʊ.næː]
[wɑː sʊ.huː.lʊn d͡ʒæs.sæ.dæt fiː.næ l.ʔɪ.bæː]
[bæː.bɪ.lʊ fiː.næ wɑː ʔɑː.ʃuː.ɾʊ læ.næː]
[wɑː bɪ.næː t.tæː.ɾiː.xʊ jæx.ðˤɑl.lʊ dˤɪ.jæː]
[næħ.nʊ fiː n.næː.si d͡ʒæm.ʕæ.næː wɑħ.dæ.næː]
[ɣɑdˤ.bæ.tʊ s.sæj.fi wɑː ħɪl.mi l.ʔæn.bɪ.jæː]
𝄆 [ħiː.næs wqɑd.næː ɾɪ.mɑː.lʊ l.ʕʊɾ.bi θæw.ɾɑh]
[wɑː ħæ.mæl.næː ɾɑː.jæ.tæ t.tæħ.ɾiː.ɾi fɪk.ɾɑh] 𝄇
[mʊn.ðʊ ʔæn læz.zɑː mʊ.ðæn.næː l.xæj.li mʊh.ɾɑh]
[wɑː sæ.læː.ħʊ d.diː.ni ɣɑ.tˤɑː.hɑː ɾɪ.mɑː.ħɑː]

Kūraːl

𝄆 [qæ.sæ.mæn bi.s.sæj.fi wɑː l.qɑw.li l.ʔæ.biː]
[wɑː sæ.hiː.li l.xæj.li ʕɪn.dæ t.tˤɑ.læ.biː] 𝄇
[ʔɪn.næ.næː suː.ɾʊ mæ.ðɑː.hɑː l.ʔɑɾ.ħæ.biː]
[wɑː hæ.diː.ɾʊ l.ʃæʕ.bi jæw.mæ n.nʊw.wæ.biː]
[ʔæw.ɾæ.θæt.næː l.biː.dʊ ɾɑː.jæː.tʊ n.næ.biː]
[wɑː s.sæ.d͡ʒæː.jæː wɑː ʃ.ʃʊ.muː.xʊ l.jæʕ.ɾʊ.biː]
[mæd͡ʒ.di.diː, d͡ʒæð.læː, bi.læː.dʊ l.ʕæ.ɾæ.biː]
[næħ.nʊ ʔæʃ.ɾɑq.næː fæ.jæː ʃæm.sʊ ʔʊɣ.ɾʊ.biː]
𝄆 [æl.d͡ʒɪ.bɑː.hʊ s.sum.ɾʊ bɪʃ.ɾʊn wɑː mæ.ħæb.bɑh]
[wɑː sˤʊ.muː.dʊn ʃæq.qɑ lɪl.ʔɪn.sæː.ni dæɾ.bɑh] 𝄇
[ʔæj.jʊ.hɑː l.qɑː.ʔɪ.dʊ lɪl.ʕæl.jæː.ʔi ʃæʕ.bɑh]
[ɪd͡ʒ.ʕæ.li l.ʔɑː.fɑː.qɑ lɪs.sˤɑw.læː.ti sæː.ħɑh]

Kūraːl

𝄆 [jæː sæ.ɾɑː.jæː l.bæʕ.θi jæː ʔʊs.dʊ l.ʕæ.ɾiːn]
[jæː ʃʊ.muː.xʊ l.ʕɪz.zi wɑː l.mæd͡ʒ.di l.tæ.liːd] 𝄇
[ɪz.ħæ.fiː kæː.l.haw.li lɪn.nɑsˤ.ɾi l.mu.biːn]
[wɑː bæʕ.θiː fiː ʔɑɾ.ðˤɪ.næː ʕæh.dʊ l.ɾæ.ʃiːd]
[næħ.nʊ d͡ʒiː.lʊ l.bæð.li fæd͡ʒ.ɾʊ l.kɑː.dɪ.ħiːn]
[jæː ɾɪ.hɑː.bʊ l.mæd͡ʒ.di ʕud.næː min d͡ʒæ.diːd]
[ʊm.mæ.tæn tæb.niː bi.ʕæz.min læː jæ.liːn]
[wɑː ʃæ.hiː.din jæq.tæ.fiː xætˤ.wɑː ʃæ.hiːd]
𝄆 [ʃæʕ.bʊ.næː l.d͡ʒæb.bɑː.ɾʊ zæh.wʊn wæn.tˤɪ.læːq]
[wɑː qɪ.læː.ʕʊ l.ʕɪz.zi jæb.niː.hæː r.ɾɪ.fɑːq] 𝄇
[dum.tæ lɪl.ʕʊɾ.bi mæ.læː.ðæn jæː ʕɪ.ɾɑːq]
[wɑː ʃʊ.muː.sæn tæd͡ʒ.ʕæ.lʊ l.læj.læ sæ.bɑː.ħɑː]

Kūraːl

English translation

Chorus:
𝄆 A fatherland has extended its wings over the horizon,
And worn the glory of civilisations as a garment.
Blessed be the land of the Euphrates,
A homeland of glorious determination and tolerance. 𝄇

𝄆 This homeland is made of flame and splendor
And pride unmatched by the highest heaven. 𝄇
'Tis a mountain that rises above the tops of the world,
And a plain that embodies our pride.
Babylon flows in our blood and Assyria is ours,
And with us history itself radiates with light,
We alone, from among mankind, combined in possession
The anger of the sword and the patience of the prophets
𝄆 When we ignited the sands of Arabs into a revolution
And bore the flag of liberty as an ideology 𝄇
Since al-Muthanna of Horses charged
And Saladin covered it with spears!

Chorus

𝄆 We pledge by sword and the speech of pride,
And the neighing of horses when in duty. 𝄇
We are the wall of its limitless range
And the roarings of people in days of war.
We inherited the flags of the Prophet from the desert
And Arabian nature and pride.
Glorify well the Land of the Arabs
We have risen; O Sun, set
𝄆 The tanned foreheads are filled with laughter and love
And firmness that cruised for humans their way 𝄇
O Thou who is leading his people to supreme elevation,
Make of the horizons our battlefields.

Chorus

𝄆 O army of the Ba'ath, o pride of lions,
O pinnacle of pride and of inherited glory, 𝄇
Advance, like terror, to a certain victory
And resurrect the time of al-Rashid in our land!
We are a generation who give all and toil to the utmost.
O expanse of glory, we have returned anew
To a nation that we build with unyielding determination.
And each martyr follows the footsteps of a former martyr.
𝄆 Our mighty nation is filled with pride and vigour
And the comrades build the fortresses of glory. 𝄇
May Thou remain forever a refuge for all Arabs, O Iraq
And be as suns that turn night into day!

Chorus

== See also ==
- List of historical national anthems
