= Kamal Al Taweel =

Egyptian composer and music author

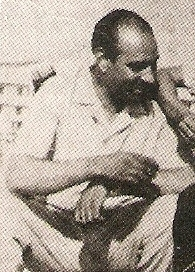
- Born: 11 October 1922; Tanta
- Died: July 9, 2003 (aged 80)
- Occupations: Singer, Composer, Television producer

Kamal Al Taweel or Kamal El-Tawil (Arabic: كمال الطويل; 11 October 1922 – 9 July 2003) was a distinguished Egyptian composer and music author.

Born as Kamal Zaki Al Taweel in 1922 in Cairo, Egypt, Kamal graduated from the school of applied arts, and worked after graduating in 1942 at the Ministry of Social Affairs; however he joined the evening classes at the Higher Institute of Arabic music. His job and responsibilities shifted many times, as he was involved in: being a member of the office staff, inspector of the telephone service, and controller of music and singing on Egyptian radio before finally moving to the Ministry of Education as an Inspector of Music. However, in 1965, he dedicated himself only to writing music.

Kamal had a distinctive relationship with the late singer Abdel Halim Hafez, especially after graduation with Faida Kamel and Ahmed Fouad Hassan of the Institute of Arabic music in 1951. Kamal entered the public service, he was elected as a member of the Council of the Parliament of Egypt. Egyptian famous actress Soad Hosni first marriage to Abdel –Halim Hafiz was at first rumored, but music composer Kamal Al-Taweel helped confirm it.

Kamal composed many songs for Nagat El-Sagheera such as “Live with me”

He survived by his wife Paola Ezzat and two sons, Khaled and Ziyad, with the latter establishing a reputation as a composer.

== Awards ==
On his death, he received the Egyptian State Merit Award.

== See also ==
- list of Egyptians
- كمال الطويل
