= List of former national anthems =

List of national anthems formerly used by sovereign states

Below is a list of various national anthems which, at some point in time, were the de jure or de facto anthems of various contemporary or historical states.

== List ==
=== Sovereign states ===
State	National anthem title in local language(s)	English translation of title	Period	Lyrics writer(s)	Anthem composer(s)	Audio	Notes
Afghanistan	"Surūd Millī" (Note: Persian: سرود ملی)	"National Anthem"	1926–1943	None (instrumental)	Khalid Rajab Bey		—
Afghanistan	"Dorūd Bozorg" (Note: Persian: درود بزرگ)	"Grand Salute"	1943–1973	Mohammed Makhtar	Mohammed Farukh		
Afghanistan	"Śo Če Dā Źməka Āsəmān Wi" (Note: Pashto: څو چې دا ځمكه آسمان وي)	"So Long as There is Earth and Heaven"	1973–1978	Abdul Rauf Benawa	Abdul Ghafoor Breshna		
Afghanistan	"Garam Ša, Lā Garam Ša" (Note: Pashto: ګرم شه، لا ګرم شه)	"Be Ardent, Be More Ardent"	1978–1992	Suleiman Laeq	Jalīl Ghahlānd		(Note: Also known by the title of "Garam shah lā garam shah" (English: "Be ardent, be more ardent").)
Afghanistan	"Qal’a-yi Islām, Qalb-i Āsiyā" (Note: Persian: قلعه اسلام قلب اسیا)	"Fortress of Islam, Heart of Asia"	1992–1996; 2002–2006	Daoud Farani	Ustad Qasim		(Note: Also known by the title of "Qal’a-ye Islam, qalb-e Asiya" (English: "Fortress of Islam, heart of Asia"); its incipit.)
Afghanistan	"Dā Də Bātorāno Kor" (Note: Pashto: دا د باتورانو کور)	"This is the Home of the Brave"	1996-2001; 2021-	Mullah Faqir Muhammad Darwesh	None	—	—
Afghanistan	"Surūd Millī" (Note: Persian: سرود ملی) "Millay Surūd" (Note: Pashto: ملی سرود)	"National Anthem"	2006-, in exile	Abdul Bari Jahani	Babrak Wassa		—
Albania (Italian Protectorate)	"Marcia Reale d'Ordinanza"	"Royal March of Ordinance"	1939-1943 (royal anthem)	Napoleone Giotti	Giuseppe Gabetti		—
Armenia	"Azgayin Sahmanadrutʼyan Yerg" (Note: Armenian: Ազգային սահմանադրության երգ)	"National Constitution Song"	1855-1918 (unofficial)	Harutiun Svachean	Gabriel Yeranyan	—	—
Armenia	"Mar Hayreniq" (Note: Armenian: Մեր Հայրենիք)	"My Fatherland"	1918-1922	Mikael Nalbandian	Barsegh Kanachyan		—
Austria	"Gott erhalte Franz den Kaiser"	"God Save Emperor Francis"	1797–1835; 1848–1854	Lorenz Leopold Haschka	Joseph Haydn		(Note: The same tune was used for numerous Austrian and Austro-Hungarian national anthems; only the lyrics changed. Although the official lyrics were in German, versions of the anthems used during the imperial period (until 1918) existed in several other languages from throughout the empire: Croatian, Czech, Hungarian, Italian, Polish and Slovene.)
Austria	"Segen Öst'reichs hohem Sohne"	"Blessings to Austria's high son"	1835–1848	Joseph Christian von Zedlitz	Joseph Haydn		(Note: The same tune was used for numerous Austrian and Austro-Hungarian national anthems; only the lyrics changed. Although the official lyrics were in German, versions of the anthems used during the imperial period existed in several other languages from throughout the empire: Czech, Croatian, Hungarian, Italian, Polish and Slovene.)
Austria	"Kaiserhymne"	"Emperor's Hymn"	1852-1918	Johann Gabriel Seidl	Joseph Haydn		
Austria	"Deutschösterreich, du herrliches Land"	"German Austria, you wonderful country"	1920–1929 (de facto)	Karl Renner	Wilhelm Kienzl		—
Austria	"Österreichische Bundeshymne"	"Austrian Federal Hymn"	1929–1938	Ottokar Kernstock	Joseph Haydn		
Azerbaijan	"Azərbaycan Sovet Sosialist Respublikasının Himni"	"Anthem of the Azerbaijan Soviet Socialist Republic"	1991–1992	Suleyman Rustam; Samad Vurgun; Huseyn Arif	Uzeyir Hajibeyov		—
Belarus	"Vajacki marš" (Note: Belarusian: "Ваяцкі марш")	"March of the Warriors"	1918–1919	Makar Kastsevich	Vladimir Teravsky		—
Bosnia and Herzegovina	"Jedna si jedina" (Note: Serbo-Croatian: "Једна си једина")	"You are the One and Only"	1992–1999	Edin Dervišhalidović	Unknown, arranged by Edin Dervišhalidović		—
Brazil	"Hino da Independência"	"Hymn of Independence"	1822–1831	Evaristo da Veiga	Pedro I of Brazil		—
Bulgaria	"Šumi Maritsa" (Note: Bulgarian: "Шуми Марица")	"Maritsa Rushes"	1886–1944	Nikola Zhivkov	Ivan Vazov		(Note: From 1908 a royal anthem, "Anthem of His Majesty the Tsar", (Note: Bulgarian: "Химн на Негово Величество Царя"; transliterated as "Himn na Negovo Velichestvo Tsarya") was adopted and played immediately after the anthem whenever the monarch was present.)
(People's Republic of Bulgaria) Bulgaria	"Republiko Naša, Zdravej!" (Note: Bulgarian: "Републико наша, здравей!")	"Hail to our Republic!"	1944–1950	Krum Penev	Georgi Dimitrov		—
(People's Republic of Bulgaria) Bulgaria	"Bǎlgarijo Mila" (Note: Bulgarian: "Българийо мила")	"Dear Bulgaria"	1950–1964	Nikola Furnadshiev; Mladen Issaev; Elisaveta Bagrjana	Georgi Dimitrov; Georgi Zlatev-Tscherkin; Svetoslav Obretenov		—
(Konbaung dynasty) Burma	"Cam-rataung:kywan:lum:su." (Note: Burmese: စံရာတောင်ကျွန်းလုံးသူ့)	"The Whole of Residential Southern Island is His"	1805–1885	Myawaddy Mingyi U Sa			—
(State of Burma) Burma	"Diu. Ba.ma Sihkyang:" (Note: Burmese: တို့ဗမာသီချင်း)	"Our Burma Song"/ "We Burman Song"	1943–1945	Thakin Ba Thaung and YMB Saya Tin	YMB Saya Tin		(Note: Popularly known "ကမ္ဘာမကြေ" (Kaba Ma Kyei), its music was later used as a template for the National Anthem of Burma which is also known as Kaba Ma Kyei.)
Cambodia	"Damnoer Satharonarodth Khmer" (Note: Khmer: ដំណើរសាធារណរដ្ឋខ្មែរ)	"March of the Khmer Republic"	1970–1975	Khieu Chum			—
(Cambodia) Kampuchea	"Dap Prampi Mesa Chokchey" (Note: Khmer: ដប់ប្រាំពីរមេសាមហាជោគជ័យ)	"Glorious Seventeenth of April"	1976–1979 (internationally depicted until 1993)	Unknown			—
(Cambodia) Kampuchea	"Bât Châmrieng ney Sathéarônârôdth Brâchéaméanit Kâmpŭchéa" (Note: Khmer: បទចម្រៀងនៃសាធារណរដ្ឋប្រជាមានិតកម្ពុជា)	"Anthem of the People's Republic of Kampuchea"	1979-1992	Unknown			—
Cambodia	"Song of the Paris Peace Agreement"		1992-1993	None (instrumental)	Norodom Ranariddh		(Note: "Song of the Paris Peace Agreement" served as the national anthem from 8 February 1992 to 24 September 1993, when the country was administered by the "United Nations Transitional Authority in Cambodia" (UNTAC) until "Nokor Reach" was restored in September 1993.)
Canada	"The Maple Leaf Forever"		1867-1980 (de facto)	Alexander Muir			—
Cape Verde	"Esta É a Nossa Pátria Bem Amada"	"This Is Our Beloved Country"	1975–1996	Amílcar Cabral	Xiao He		(Note: "Esta É a Nossa Pátria Bem Amada" was adopted in 1975 by both Cape Verde and Guinea-Bissau on their respective independence from Portugal. Cape Verde introduced a unique anthem in 1996, but it remains the national anthem of Guinea-Bissau.)
Chile	"Canción Nacional Chilena"	"Chilean National Song"	1819–1847	Bernardo de Vera y Pintado	Manuel Robles Gutiérrez		—
China	"Pu Tian Yue" (Note: Chinese: 普天樂)	"Whole Sky Song"	1878-1896	Zeng Jize			—
China	"Li Zhong Tan Yue" (Note: Chinese: 李中堂乐)	"Tune of Li Zhongtang"	1896–1906	Li Hongzhang			—
China	"Song Long Qi" (Note: Chinese: 颂龙旗)	"Praise the Dragon Flag"	1906–1911	"Collective"			—
China	"Gong Jin'ou" (Note: Chinese: 鞏金甌)	"Cup of Solid Gold"	1911–1912	Yan Fu	Bo Tong		—
China	"Wǔzú gònghé gē" (Note: Chinese: 五族共和歌)	"Song of Five Races Under One Union"	1912-1913	Shen Enfu	Shen Pengnian		—
China	"Zhōngguó xióng lì yǔzhòujiān" (Note: Chinese: 中國雄立宇宙間)	"China Heroically Stands in the Universe"	1915–1921	Yin Chang	Wang Lu		—
China	"Qing yun gē" (Note: Chinese: 卿云歌)	"The Song to the Auspicious Cloud"	1913–1915; 1921–1928	Zhang Taiyan	Xiao Youmei		—
China	"Guómín gémìng gē" (Note: Chinese: 國民革命歌)	"Revolution of the Citizens"	1926–1928	Liao Qianwu	Traditional	—	—
China	"Zhōnghuá Mínguó guógē" (Note: Chinese: 中華民國國歌)	"National Anthem of the Republic of China"	1928–1949	Yat-sen Sun	Maoyun Cheng		(Note: Currently used as the national anthem of Taiwan.)
China	"Dōngfāng Hóng" (Note: Chinese:東方紅)	"The East is Red"	1966-1976 (de-facto)	Li Youyuan	Traditional		(Note: Served as the unofficial anthem during the "Cultural Revolution" from 1966-1976 when the author of "March of the Volunteers", Tian Han was purged.)
Chinese Soviet Republic	"Guójìgē" (Note: Chinese: 国际歌)	"The Internationale"	1931–1937	Qu Qiubai	Pierre De Geyter		
Comoros	"Wungwana Ngasi Nuwo"	"We have the Freedom"	1975–1978	Unknown			—
Congo Free State	"Vers l'avenir"	"Towards the Future"	1905-1908	Gentil Theodoor Antheunis	François-Auguste Gevaert		—
(Republic of the Congo) Congo	"Les Trois Glorieuses"	"The Three Glorious Days"	1969–1991	Henri Lopès	Philippe Mockouamy		—
(Khedivate of Egypt) Egypt	"Salam Affandina"	"Peace be upon you"	1871–1922; 1936–1958	—	Giuseppe Pugioli		
Egypt	"Eslami ya Misr" (Note: Egyptian Arabic: اسلمى يا مصر)	"Be Safe Oh Egypt"	1923–1936	Mostafa Saadeq Al-Rafe'ie	Safar Ali		
Egypt	"Alsalam Aljumhuriu Almisri"	"Egyptian Republican Anthem"	1953–1958	—	Giuseppe Pugioli		
Egypt	"Walla Zaman Ya Selahy" (Note: Egyptian Arabic: والله زمان يا سلاحي)	"Oh For Ages! My Weapon!"	1971–1979	Salah Jahin	Kamal Al Taweel		—
El Salvador	"Himno Nacional de El Salvador"	"National Anthem of El Salvador"	1866-1871	Tomás M. Muñoz	Rafael Orozco	—	—
El Salvador	"El Salvador Libre"	"Free El Salvador"	1891-1894	Césare Georgi Vélez		—	—
Ethiopia	"Ityopp'ya Hoy Dess Yibelish" (Note: Amharic: ኢትዮጵያ ሆይ ደስ ይበልሽ)	"Ethiopia Be Happy"	1930–1975	"Collective"	Kevork Nalbandyan		—
Ethiopia	"Ityopp'ya, Ityopp'ya, Ityopp'ya qida mi" (Note: Amharic: ኢትዮጵያ, ኢትዮጵያ, ኢትዮጵያ ቅደሚ)	"Ethiopia, Ethiopia, Ethiopia Be First"	1975–1992	Assefa Gebre-Mariam Tessama	Daniel Yohannes Haggos		—
(Kingdom of France) France	"Marche Henri IV"	"March of Henry IV"	1590-1789	Unknown			
(Kingdom of France) France	"Vive Louis XVI"	"Long Live Louis XVI"	1789-1792	Unknown			
(First French Empire) France	"Chant du départ"	"Song of the Departure"	1804–1815	Marie-Joseph Chénier	Étienne Nicolas Méhul		(Note: Although it is the first to appear on this list, "Chant du départ" was not the original national anthem of France; "La Marseillaise", the modern national anthem, was originally used from 1795 to 1799. It was readopted in 1870.)
(First French Empire) France	"Veillons au salut de l'Empire"	"Let's ensure the salvation of the Empire"	1804-1815 (Unofficial)	Adrien-Simon Boy	François-Joseph Gossec		
France	"Le Retour des Princes français à Paris"	"The Return of the French Princes to Paris"	1814–1815; 1815–1830	Unknown	François-Henri Castil-Blaze		—
France	"Où peut-on être mieux qu’au sein de sa famille ?"	"Where can you be better than in your family ?"	1814–1815; 1815–1830 (Unofficial)	Jean-François Marmontel	André Grétry	—	—
France	"La Parisienne"	"The Parisian"	1830–1848	Casimir Delavigne	Daniel Auber		—
France	"Le Chant des Girondins"	"The Song of Girondists"	1848–1852	Alexandre Dumas; Auguste Maquet; Claude-Joseph Rouget de Lisle	Alphonse Varney		—
France	"Partant pour la Syrie"	"Departing for Syria"	1852–1870	Alexandre de Laborde	Hortense de Beauharnais		—
France	"Maréchal, nous voilà !"	"Marshal, Here we are !"	1941-1944 (Unofficial)	André Montagnard	credited to André Montagnard and Charles Courtioux, actually plagiarised from Casimir Oberfeld		—
France	"Chant des Partisans"	"Song of the Partisans"	1943-1944 (Unofficial)	Joseph Kessel and Maurice Druon	Anna Marly		—
(Georgia (country)) Georgia	"Dideba" (Note: Georgian: "დიდება")	"Praise"	1918–1920; 1990–2004	Kote Potskhverashvili			—
Germany	"Das Lied der Deutschen"	"The Song of the Germans"	1848-1849 (Unofficial)	August Heinrich Hoffmann von Fallersleben	Joseph Haydn		—
Germany	"Heil dir im Siegerkranz"	"Hail to Thee in Victor's Crown"	1871–1918	Heinrich Harries	Unknown		—
Germany	"Die Wacht am Rhein"	"The Watch on the Rhine"	1871-1918 (Unofficial)	Max Schneckenburger	Karl Wilhelm (conductor)		—
Germany	"Das Lied der Deutschen"	"The Song of the Germans"	1922–1933	August Heinrich Hoffmann von Fallersleben	Joseph Haydn		(Note: During Germany's Weimar period, all three verses of "Das Lied der Deutschen" were sung, whereas today only the third verse is sung.)
Germany	"Das Lied der Deutschen"	"The Song of the Germans"	1933–1945	August Heinrich Hoffmann von Fallersleben	Joseph Haydn		(Note: During Germany's Nazi period, only the first verse of "Das Lied der Deutschen" was sung, and followed by "Horst-Wessel-Lied", the SA song written by Horst Wessel.)
Germany	"Horst-Wessel-Lied"	"Song of Horst Wessel"	1933–1945	Horst Wessel			(Note: During Germany's Nazi period, only the first verse of "Das Lied der Deutschen" was sung, and followed by "Horst-Wessel-Lied", the SA song written by Horst Wessel.)
West Germany	"Ich hab' mich ergeben"	"I have given myself"	1949–1952	Hans Ferdinand Maßmann	August Daniel von Binzer		(Note: Unofficial, de facto. Shares the same tune as the current Micronesian national anthem.)
West Germany	"Hymne an Deutschland"	"Hymn to Germany"	1950-1952 (De facto)	Rudolf Alexander Schröder	Hermann Reutter	—	—
West Germany	"Das Lied der Deutschen"	"The Song of the Germans"	1952–1990	August Heinrich Hoffmann von Fallersleben	Joseph Haydn		(Note: Although officially all three verses were designated as the West German national anthem, in practice only the third verse was actually performed in public.)
Guatemala	"La Granadera"	"The Grenadier"	1847–1879	Rómulo Durón	Unknown		—
Guatemala	"Himno Popular de Guatemala"	"People's Anthem of Guatemala"	1879–1896	Ramón Molina	Rafael Álvarez Ovalle		—
Greece	"Ύmnos tes 21es Aprilioe" (Note: Greek: "Ύμνος της 21ης Απριλίου")	"Anthem of the 21st of April"	1967-1974 (Unofficial)	George Oikonomidis	George Katsaros		—
Grenada	"Grenada National State Anthem"		1967–1974	Rolstan Percival Jawahir Adams	John George Fletcher		—
Haiti	"Quand nos Aïeux brisèrent leurs entraves"	"When our ancestors broke their chains"	1893–1904	Oswald Durand	Unknown		—
Honduras	"La Granadera"	"The Grenadier"	1838–1915	Rómulo Durón	Unknown		—
Honduras	"Dios Salve a Honduras"	"God Save Honduras"	1890–1915	None (instrumental)	"Laurcano Campos"	—	—
Hungary	"Internacionálé"	"The Internationale"	1919	Eugène Pottier; Ernő Bresztovszky (translation)	Pierre De Geyter		—
Hungary	"Ébredj Magyar"	"Wake up, Hungarian!"	1944-1945	Károly Uy and Miklós Bitskey	Sámy Zoltán		—
Iceland	"Eldgamla Ísafold"	"Ancient Iceland"	1918-1944 (Unofficial)	Bjarni Thorarensen	Unknown		—
Persia	"Salām-e Shāh" (Note: Persian: سلام شاه)	"Royal Salute"	1873–1909	None (instrumental)	Alfred Jean Baptiste Lemaire		—
Persia	"Salāmati-ye Dowlat-e 'Aliyye-ye Irān" (Note: Persian: سلامتی دولت علیهٔ ایران)	"Salute of the Sublime State of Persia"	1909–1933	Unknown	Gholam-Reza Minbashian		—
Iran	"Sorude Melli" (Note: Persian: سرود ملی)	"National Anthem"	1933–1979	Mohammad-Hashem Afsar	Davud Najmi Moghaddam		(Note: Tune same as that used in the royal anthem and flag anthem of Iran at the time.)
(Pahlavi Iran) Iran	"Ey Iran" (Note: Persian: ای ایران)	"Oh Iran"	1979–1980	Hossein Gol-e-Golab	Ruhollah Khaleghi		—
Iran	"Payandeh Bada Iran" (Note: Persian: پاینده بادا ایران)	"A Lasting Iran"	1980–1990	Abolghasem Halat	Mohammad Beglary-Pour		—
Iraq	"As-Salam al-Malaki"	"Peace to the King"	1924–1958	None (instrumental)	A. Chaffon		(Note: Title also given as "The Royal Salute" (Arabic: السلام الملكي))
Iraq	"Mawtini"	"My Country"	1958–1965, 2003–2004	None (instrumental)	L. Zanbaka		(Note: Not to be confused with the current Iraqi national anthem, which shares the same name.)
Iraq	"Walla Zaman Ya Selahy"	"Oh For Ages! My Weapon!"	1965–1981	Salah Jahin (Note: Iraq didn't adopt lyrics)	Kamal Al Taweel		(Note: Title in Arabic: والله زمان يا سلاحي)
Iraq	"Ardulfurataini" (Note: Iraqi Arabic: أرض الفراتين)	"The Land of the Euphrates"	1981–2003	Shafiq Alkamali	Walid Georges Gholmieh		—
Ireland	"God Save Ireland"		1916, 1919-1922 (Unofficial)	Timothy Daniel Sullivan	George Frederick Root	—	—
(Republic of Ireland) Ireland	"Let Erin Remember"		1924–1926	Unknown		—	(Note: De facto, never officially adopted.)
Italy	"Marcia Reale d'Ordinanza"	"Royal March of Ordinance"	1861–1943, 1944–1946	Unknown	Giuseppe Gabetti		—
Italy	"La Leggenda del Piave"	"The Legend of Piave"	1943–1944	E. A. Mario			—
Italy	"Giovinezza"	"Youth"	1924–1945 (de facto)	Nino Oxilia	Salvatore Gotta		—
Japan	"Kimigayo" (Note: Japanese: "君きみ が 代")	"His Majesty's Reign"	1869-1880	Traditional "Waka poem" from the "Kokin Wakashū"	John William Fenton		(Note: "Lyrics were kept for the current anthem.)
Alash	"Oian, Qazaq!" (Note: Kazakh: "Оян, Қазақ!")	"Wake Up, Kazakh!"	1917-1920	Unknown		—	—
Kazakhstan	"Qazaqstan Respwblïkasınıñ memlekettik änuranı" (Note: Kazakh: "Қазақстан Республикасының Мемлекеттік Әнұраны")	"Anthem of the Republic of Kazakhstan"	1992–2006	Muzafar Alimbayev; Kadyr Myrzaliyev; Tumanbai Moldigaliyev; Zhadyra Daribayeva	Mukan Tulebayev; Yevgeny Brusilovsky; Latif Khamidi		—
Korea	"Daehan jeguk aegukga" (Note: Korean: 대한제국 애국가)	"Patriotic song of the Great Korean Empire"	1902–1910	Unknown	Franz Eckert		—
Chōsen	"Kimigayo"	"His Imperial Majesty's Reign"	1910–1945	Unknown	Franz Eckert		—
Korea	"Aegukga"	"Patriotic Song"	1919–1945	Unknown	Unknown (set to the tune of "Auld Lang Syne"		(Note: Lyrics same as those used in the current South Korean national anthem.)
South Korea	"Aegukga"	"Patriotic Song"	1945–1948	Unknown			
Kosova	"Himni i Flamurit"	"Hymn to the Flag"	1991-2000	Aleksandër Stavre Drenova	Ciprian Porumbescu		—
Kuwait	"As-salām al-amīrī" (Note: Arabic: السلام الأميري)	"Amiri Salute"	1951–1978	None (instrumental)	Yusuf Adees		(Note: The modern national anthem of Kuwait, adopted in 1978, retains "Amiri Salute" in its entirety as an opening fanfare.)
Laos	"Pheng Xat Lao" (Note: Lao: ເພງຊາດລາວ)	"Anthem of the Lao people"	1951–1975	Maha Phoumi	Thongdy Sounthonevichit		(Note: After the founding of the present Lao People's Democratic Republic, "Pheng Xat Lao" had its words, but not its music, changed.)
Libya	"Lībīya, Lībīya, Lībīya" (Note: Libyan Arabic: لیبیا، لیبیا، لیبیا)	"Libya, Libya, Libya"	1951–1969	Al Bashir Al Arebi	Mohammed Abdel Wahab		(Note: "Lībīya, Lībīya, Lībīya" was relinquished in 1969, was but re-adopted as the national anthem of Libya after the victory of the National Transitional Council over the Gaddafi regime in 2011, the only difference being the omission of a verse glorifying King Idris.)
Libya	"Walla Zaman Ya Selahy"	"Oh My Weapon"	1969–1972	Salah Jahin	Kamal Al Taweel		—
Libya	"Allahu Akbar" (Note: Libyan Arabic: الله أكبر)	"God is Greatest"	1972–2011	Mahmood El-Sharif	Abdalla Shams El-Din		—
Maldives	"Salaamathi" (Note: Dhivehi:ސަލާމަތީ)	"Safety"	?-1948	None (instrumental)	Unknown	—	—
Maldives	"Gaumee Salaam" (Note: Dhivehi: "ޤައުމީ ސަލާމް")	"National Salute"	1948-1972	Mohamed Jameel Didi	Unknown (set to the tune of "Auld Lang Syne"	—	(Note: "Lyrics were kept for the current anthem.)
Mali Federation	"Hymne du Mali"	"Anthem of Mali"	1960	Léopold Sédar Senghor	Banzumana Sissoko	—	—
Marshall Islands	"Ij Io̧kwe Ļo̧k Aelōn̄ Eo Aō"	"I Love the Islands"	1986–1991	Unknown	Samuel Langrine		—
Mauritania	"Nashid Wataniin Muritaniin" (Note: Arabic: نشيد وطني موريتاني)	"National Anthem of Mauritania"	1960–2017	Baba Ould Cheikh	Tolia Nikiprowetzky		—
Mexico	"Veni Creator Spiritus"	"Come, Creator Spirit"	1821-1823	Rabanus Maurus	Unknown		—
Micronesia	"Preamble"		1979–1991	Unknown			—
Moldavian Democratic Republic	"Deșteaptă-te, române!"	"Awaken thee, Romanian!"	1917–1918	Andrei Mureșanu	Anton Pann		—
Moldova	"Deșteaptă-te, române!"	"Awaken thee, Romanian!"	1991–1994	Andrei Mureșanu	Anton Pann		—
Mongolia	"Zuun Langiin Joroo Luus" (Note: Mongolian: ᠵᠠᠭᠤᠨ ᠯᠠᠩ ᠤᠨ ᠵᠢᠷᠤᠭ᠎ᠠ ᠯᠠᠭᠤᠰᠠ (original orthography))	"The Hundred-Tael Pacing Mule"	1911–1919, 1921–1924	Unknown			—
Mongolian People's Republic	"Моngol Internatsional" (Note: Mongolian: ᠮᠣᠩᠭᠣᠯ ᠢᠨᠲ᠋ᠧᠷᠨᠠᠼᠢᠤᠨᠠᠯ (original orthography))	"Mongol Internationale"	1924–1950	Sonombalshiryn Bujannemech	Magsarshawyn Durgarshaw		—
Montenegro	"Ubavoj nam Crnoj Gori" (Note: Serbian Cyrillic: "Убавој нам Црној Гори")	"Our Beautiful Montenegro"	1910–1918	Jovan Sundečić	Jovo Ivanišević		—
Mozambique	"Viva, Viva a FRELIMO"	"Long Live FRELIMO"	1975–2002	Justino Sigaulane Chemane			—
Namibia	"Nkosi Sikelel' iAfrika"	"Lord Bless Africa"	1990–1991	Enoch Sontonga	Enoch Sontonga and Joseph Parry		—
Nepal	"Shriman Gambhir" (Note: Nepali: श्रीमान गम्भीर)	"May Glory Crown Our Illustrious Sovereign"	1962–2006	Chakrapani Chalise	Bakhatbir Budhapirthi		—
Netherlands	"Wien Neêrlands Bloed"	"Those in whom Dutch blood"	1815–1932	Hendrik Tollens	Johann Wilhelm Wilms		—
Nicaragua	"Nicaragua"		1876–1889	F. Alvarez	J. del Carmen Vega		
Nicaragua	"Marcha Roberto Sacasa"	"March of Roberto Sacasa"	1889–1893	None (instrumental)	Alejandro Cousin		
Nicaragua	"Hermosa Soberana"	"Beautiful and Sovereign"	1893–1910	Unknown	Alejandro Cousin	—	
Niger	"La Nigérienne"	"The Nigerien"	1961–2023	Maurice Albert Thiriet	Robert Jacquet; Nicolas Abel François Frionnet		—
Nigeria	"Nigeria We Hail Thee"		1960–1978	Lilian Jean Williams	Frances Benda		—
Nigeria	"Arise, O Compatriots"		1978–2024	John A. Ilechukwu; Eme Etim Akpan; B. A. Ogunnaike; Sota Omoigui; P. O. Aderibigbe	Nigerian Police Band under the directorship of B. E. Odiasse		
Norway	"Norges Skaal"	"Toast to Norway"	1771–1819	Johan Nordahl Brun	Unknown		—
Norway	"Sønner av Norge"	"Sons of Norway"	1820–c.1905	Henrik Anker Bjerregaard	Christian Blom	—	—
Pakistan	"Tarana-e-Pakistan" (Note: Urdu: ترانہ پاکستان)	"Anthem of Pakistan"	1947–1950	Jagan Nath Azad		—	—
Pakistan (East)	"Pakistan Zindabad (Tarana-i-Pakistan)"	"Long Live Pakistan (Tarana of Pakistan)"	1956–1971	Golam Mostofa	Nazir Ahmed	—	—
Palestine	"Mawtini"	"My Homeland"	1988–1996	Ibrahim Tuqan	Mohammed Flayfel		—
Philippines	"Marangal na Dalit ng Katagalugan"	"Noble Hymn of the Tagalogs"	1895–1899	Juan Nakpil		—	—
(Second Philippine Republic) Philippines	"Awit sa Paglikha ng Bagong Pilipinas"	"Hymn to the Creation of a New Philippines"	1943-1945	Catalino S. Dionisio	Felipe Padilla de León	—	—
Poland	"Bogurodzica"	"Mother of God"	977–1795	Adalbert of Prague			(Note: Bogurodzica was created somewhere between the 10th and 13th centuries. Adalbert of Prague is believed to be the creator of the Polish hymn by most scholars; he lived between 956 and 997. Bogurodzica was used as the national anthem of the Kingdom of Poland from its creation until 1795 with the end of the Crown of the Kingdom of Poland)
Portugal	"Hymno Patriótico"	"Patriotic Hymn"	1809–1834	Unknown	Marcos António Portugal		—
Portugal	"Hino da Carta"	"Hymn to the Charter"	1834–1911	Pedro IV of Portugal			—
Qatar	"An-Nashīd al-Waṭani l-dawlat Qaṭar"	"National Anthem"	1954–1996	None (instrumental)	Unknown		—
Rhodesia	"God Save the Queen"		1965-1970	Unknown			—
Rhodesia	"Rise, O Voices of Rhodesia"		1974–1979	Mary Bloom	Ludwig van Beethoven		(Note: Rhodesia's 1965 Unilateral Declaration of Independence (UDI) went unrecognised by the United Kingdom and the United Nations, both of which continued to consider Rhodesia to be the British colony of Southern Rhodesia. Despite declaring independence, the "de facto" Rhodesian government still maintained loyalty to Elizabeth II and so retained Britain's national anthem, "God Save the Queen", until it declared Rhodesia a republic in 1970. A replacement state anthem was not adopted until 1974, when "Rise, O Voices of Rhodesia" came into use. As its independence was illegal, "God Save the Queen" remained Rhodesia's "de jure" national anthem throughout the UDI period of 1965 to 1979.)
Romania	"Marș triumfal"	"Triumphant March"	1862–1884	None (instrumental)	Eduard Hübsch	—	
Romania	"Trăiască Regele"	"Long live the King"	1884–1948	Vasile Alecsandri	Eduard Hübsch		
Romania	"Zdrobite cătușe"	"Broken Handcuffs"	1948–1953	Aurel Baranga	Matei Socor		
Romania	"Te slăvim, Românie"	"We glorify thee, Romania"	1953–1975	Eugen Frunză; Dan Deșliu	Matei Socor		
Romania	"E scris pe tricolor Unire"	"Unity is written on our flag"	1975–1977	Andrei Bârseanu	Ciprian Porumbescu		
Romania	"Trei culori"	"Three Colours"	1977–1989	Unknown; adapted from the original "Cântecul tricolorului"	Ciprian Porumbescu		
Romania	"Trei culori"	"Three Colours"	1989-1990	Ciprian Porumbescu			—
Russia	"Kol' Slaven" (Note: Russian: "Коль славенъ")	"How Glorious"	1790-1816, 1918–1920	Mikhail Kheraskov	Dmitry Bortniansky		—
Russia	"Molitva russkikh" (Note: Russian: "Молитва русских")	"The Prayer of Russians"	1816–1833	Vasily Zhukovsky	Unknown (same tune as "God Save the King")		—
Russia	"Bozhe, Tsarya khrani!" (Note: Russian: "Боже, Царя храни!")	"God Save the Tsar!"	1833–1917	Vasily Zhukovsky	Alexei Lvov		—
Russia	"Rabochaya Marselyeza" (Note: Russian: "Рабочая Марсельеза")	"Worker's Marseillaise"	1917	Pyotr Lavrov	Robert Schumann		—
Russia	"Rabochaya Marselyeza"	"Worker's Marseillaise"	1917–1918	Pyotr Lavrov	Robert Schumann		(Note: The "Worker's Marseillaise" was briefly used alongside "The Internationale" by the Russian Soviet Federative Socialist Republic from 1917 to 1918.)
Russian SFSR	"Internatsional" (Note: Russian: "Интернационал")	"The Internationale"	1917–1922	Eugène Pottier	Pierre De Geyter		(Note: Subsequently adopted by the Soviet Union in 1922 and used until 1944; the "Worker's Marseillaise" was briefly used alongside "The Internationale" by Russia from 1917 to 1918.)
Russia	"Patrioticheskaya Pesnya"' (Note: Russian: "Патриотическая песня")	"The Patriotic Song"	1990–2000	Unknown	Mikhail Glinka		
Rwanda	"Rwanda Rwacu"	"Our Rwanda"	1962–2002	Michael Habarurema; Abanyuramatwi			—
San Marino	"Inno di San Marino"	"Anthem of San Marino"	?–1894 (de facto)	Ulisse Balsimelli	Aurelio Muccioli	—	
Saudi Arabia	"السلام الملكي السعودي"	"Long live our King"	1953–1984	No lyrics	Abdul Rahman Al-Khateeb		—
Serbia	"Vostani Serbije" (Note: Serbian: "Устани Србијо")	"Arise, Serbia"	1815-1882 (Unofficial)	Dositej Obradović	None	—	(Note: Originally did not have formal musical notes, it was later set to music written by Vartkes Baronijan, Zlatan Vauda and Ljuba Manasijević.)
Serbia	"Oj Srbijo, mila mati" (Note: Serbian: "Ој Србијо, мила мати")	"Oh Serbia, Dear Mother"	1941–1944 (Unofficial)	Luka Sarić	Vojtěch Šístek	—	—
Seychelles	"En Avant"	"Forward"	1976–1978	Unknown		—	—
Seychelles	"Fyer Seselwa"	"Be Proud Seychellois"	1978–1996	Unknown	Pierre Dastros-Géze		—
(Thailand) Siam	"Chom Rat Chong Charoen" (Note: Thai: "จอมราชจงเจริญ")	"Long live the Great King"	1852–1871	Phraya Srisunthonwohan (Noi Āchāryānkura)	Unknown		—
Siam	"Bulan Loi Luean" (Note: Thai:"บุหลันลอยเลื่อน")	"The Floating Moon on the Sky"	1871-1888	Unknown	Rama II (original) Christopher Hewetson (Western arrangement)	—	—
Siam	"Phleng Sansoen Phra Barami" (Note: Thai: เพลงสรรเสริญพระบารมี)	"Glorify His prestige"	1888–1932	Unknown	Narisara Nuwattiwong Vajiravudh		(Note: Although replaced as national anthem in 1932, "Sansoen Phra Barami" was retained as Siam's (and, following the country's change of name in 1939, Thailand's) royal anthem.)
Slovakia	"Hej, Slováci"	"Hey, Slovaks"	1939–1945	Samuel Tomášik	Unknown		—
Somalia	"Heesta qaranqa Soomaaliya"	"National anthem of Somalia"	1960–2000	None (instrumental)	Giuseppe Blanc		—
Somalia	"Soomaaliyeey toosoo"	"Somalia, Wake Up"	2000–2012	Ali Mire Awale	Ali Mire Awale; Yusuf Haji Aden	—	(Note: Served as Somalia's national anthem until 2012, when it was replaced with "Qolobaa Calankeed".)
South Africa	"God bewaar ons Koningin"	"God Save the King"	1910–1957	Unknown			(Note: Was the sole de jure national anthem from 1910 to 1938. From 1938 to 1957, it officially shared co-national anthem status with "Die Stem van Suid-Afrika", upon which the latter became the sole national anthem. It remained the royal anthem until 1961.)
South Africa	"Die Stem van Suid-Afrika"	"The Call of South Africa"	1938–1997	Cornelis Jacobus Langenhoven	Marthinus Lourens de Villiers		(Note: From 1938 to 1957, it served as a co-national anthem with equal status with "God Save the King and "God Save the Queen". It had served as a sort of de facto co-national anthem since the 1920s. From 1957 to 1994, it was the sole national anthem. "The Call of South Africa" and "God Bless Africa" became co-national anthems of South Africa in 1994. The modern South African national anthem, adopted in 1997, uses elements from each as separate segments in a single composition.)
South Africa	"Nkosi Sikelel' iAfrika"	"Lord Bless Africa"	1994–1997	Enoch Sontonga	Enoch Sontonga and Joseph Parry		(Note: "The Call of South Africa" and "God Bless Africa" became co-national anthems of South Africa in 1994. The modern South African national anthem, adopted in 1997, uses elements from each in separate segments.)
Spain	"Himno de Riego"	"Anthem of Riego"	1820-1823; 1873-1874; 1931–1939	José Melchor Gomis			
Spain	"Triple Himno"	"Triple Anthem"	1936-1939	Ignacio Baleztena Ascaráte (March of Oriamendi); José Antonio Primo de Rivera (Cara al Sol); N/A (Marcha Real)	José Juan Santesteban (March of Oriamendi); Juan Tellería, Juan R. Buendia (Cara al Sol); Manuel de Espinosa de los Monteros (Marcha Real)	—	(Note: The "Triple Anthem" was a mix of the March of Oriamendi, the anthem of the Carlists, Cara al Sol, the anthem of the Falange, and the Marcha Real)
Spain	"Marcha Granadera"	"Grenadier March"	1936–1975	José María Pemán	Bartolomé Pérez Casas		(Note: Remains the national anthem of Spain, however the lyrics have since been removed and it is now referred to under its title of "Marcha Real".)
Sweden	"Gustafs skål"	"Gustav's Toast"	1772–1792	Carl Michael Bellman		—	—
Sweden	"Bevare Gud vår kung"	"God Save Our King"	1805–1809	Abraham Niclas Edelcrantz	Unknown		—
Switzerland	"Rufst du, mein Vaterland"	"When you call, my fatherland"	c. 1850–1961	Johann Rudolf Wyss; Henri Roehrich	Unknown (same tune as "God Save the King")		
Syria	"Humat ad-Diyar" (Note: Arabic: حُمَاةَ الدِّيَارِ)	"Guardians of the Homeland"	1938–1958	Mohammed Flayfel	Khalil Mardam Bey		—
Syria	"Humat ad-Diyar" (Note: Arabic: حُمَاةَ الدِّيَارِ)	"Guardians of the Homeland"	1961–1963	Mohammed Flayfel	Khalil Mardam Bey		—
Syria	"Humat ad-Diyar" (Note: Arabic: حُمَاةَ الدِّيَارِ)	"Guardians of the Homeland"	1963–2024	Mohammed Flayfel	Khalil Mardam Bey		(Note: Syria has been governed by a transitional government since the fall of the Assad regime on 8 December 2024, and it remains unclear whether this song will continue to be used as the national anthem. In March 2025, President Ahmed al-Sharaa signed the Constitutional Declaration, whose Article 5 states that the national anthem shall be determined by law.)
Togo	"L'Unité Nationale"	"National Unity"	1979-1992	"Collective"		—	—
Tunisia	"Salam al-Bey" (Note: Tunisian Arabic: سلام الباي)	"Beylical Salute"	1846–1958	Unknown		—	—
Tunisia	"Ala Khallidi" (Note: Tunisian Arabic: ألا خلّدي)	"Immortal and Precious"	1958–1987	Jalaleddine Naccache	Salah El Mahdi	—	—
Turkey	"İstiklâl Marşı"	"Independence March"	1924–1930	Mehmet Akif Ersoy	Ali Rıfât Çağatay		—
Turkmenistan	"Türkmenistan Sowet Socialistik Respublikasy Döwlet Gimni"	"State Anthem of the Turkmen Soviet Socialist Republic"	1991–1996	—	Veli Mukhatov		(Note: Previously, with lyrics, used as the regional anthem of the Soviet Union's Turkmen SSR until 1991.)
United States	"Hail, Columbia"		1789–1931 (de facto)	Joseph Hopkinson	Philip Phile		—
United States	"My Country, 'Tis of Thee"		c. 1831–1931 (de facto)	Samuel Francis Smith	Unknown (same tune as "God Save the King")		(Note: "My Country, 'Tis of Thee" is generally considered to have been the "de facto" national anthem of the United States prior to 1931, but not universally. Alternatives included "Hail, Columbia", and the modern anthem, "The Star-Spangled Banner".)
Ukraine	"Derzhavnyy himn Ukrayinskoyi Radyanskykh Sotsialistychnoyi Respubliky" (Note: "Ukrainian: Державний гімн Української Радянської Соціалістичної Республіки)	"State Anthem of the Ukrainian SSR"	1991–1992	Mykola Bazhan	Anton Dmytrovych Lebedynets		
Upper Volta	"Hymne National Voltaïque"	"Voltaique National Anthem"	1960–1984	Robert Ouedraogo			—
Vatican City	"Marcia trionfale"	"Triumphal March"	1929–1950	(instrumental only)	Viktorin Hallmayer		(Note: The Papal States became part of Italy in 1870, but the anthem was retained as the Vatican City's first anthem until 1950.)
Vietnam	"Đăng đàn cung"	"The Emperor Mounts His Throne"	1802–1945	Ung Thieu	J.B. Chaigneau		—
Vietnam	"Việt Nam minh châu trời Đông"	"Viet Nam, the Pearl in the Eastern Sky"	1945	Hùng Lân		—	—
Zaire	"La Zaïroise"	"The Zairian"	1972–1997	Joseph Lutumba	Simon-Pierre Boka Di Mpasi Londi		—
Zambia	"Nkosi Sikelel' iAfrika"	"Lord Bless Africa"	1964–1973	Enoch Sontonga	Enoch Sontonga and Joseph Parry		—
Zimbabwe	"Ishe Komborera Africa"	"God Bless Africa"	1980–1994	Enoch Sontonga	Enoch Sontonga and Joseph Parry		(Note: "Ishe Komborera Africa" is a translation of "Nkosi Sikelel' iAfrika" from Xhosa into Shona and Ndebele.)

=== Sovereign states (abolished) ===
State	National anthem title in local language(s)	English translation of title	Period	Lyrics writer(s)	Anthem composer(s)	Audio	Notes
Republic of Artsakh	"Azat u ankakh Artsakh" (Note: Armenian: "Ազատ ու անկախ Արցախ")	"A Free and Independent Artsakh"	1994–2023	Vardan Hakobyan	Armen Nasibyan		
Austria	"Gott erhalte Franz den Kaiser"	"God Save Francis the Emperor"	1854–1867	Johann Gabriel Seidl	Joseph Haydn		
Austria-Hungary	"Gott erhalte, Gott beschütze"	"God preserve, God protect"	1867–1918	Johann Gabriel Seidl	Joseph Haydn		
Azad Hind	"Shubh Sukh Chain"	"Auspicious Happiness"	1943–1945	Abid Hasan; Mumtaz Hussain	Ram Singh Thakuri	—	(Note: The same tune is used for the current Indian national anthem.)
Azerbaijan People's Government	"Yaşa, yaşa Azərbaycan!"	"Long Live Azerbaijan!"	1945-1946	Jahangir Jahangirov	Mir Mehdi Etima		—
Baden	"Badnerlied"	"Song of Baden"	1865–1871	Unknown		—	(Note: The anthems of the previously independent German kingdoms and duchies continued to be used as regional anthems until the fall of the German Empire in 1918.)
Bavaria	"Bayernhymne"	"Hymn of Bavaria"	1806–1871	Michael Öchsner	Max Kunz		
Bavaria	"Die Internationale"	"The Internationale"	1919	Eugène Pottier; Emil Luckhardt (translation)	Pierre De Geyter		—
Biafra	"Land of the Rising Sun"		1967–1970	Unknown	Jean Sibelius		—
Bophuthatswana (Bantustan)	"Lefatshe leno la bo-rrarona"	"This Land of Our Forefathers"	1976–1994	J. M. Ntsime	E. B. Mathibe; J. J. Loots		—
Brunswick	"Marsch Herzog von Braunschweig"	"March Duke of Brunswick"	1815-1918	None (instrumental)	Unknown		—
Cabinda	"A Pátria Imortal"	"The Immortal Fatherland"	1975-1976	Unknown		—	—
Central America	"La Granadera"	"The Grenadier"	1823–1839	Rómulo Durón	Unknown		—
Central Lithuania	"Rota"	The Oath	1920-1922	Maria Konopnicka	Feliks Nowowiejski		—
Chechen Republic of Ichkeria	"Joƶalla ya marşo" (Note: Chechen: Ӏожалла я маршо)	"Death or Freedom"	1991–2000	Abuzar Aydamirov	Ali Dimayev or Umar Beksultanov		—
Ciskei (Bantustan)	"Nkosi Sikelel' iAfrika"	"Lord Bless Africa"	1976–1994	Enoch Sontonga	Enoch Sontonga and Joseph Parry		—
Confederate States	"God Save the South"		1861–1865 (de facto)	George Henry Miles	Charles Ellerbrock		
Confederate States	"Dixie"		1861-1865 (de facto)	Daniel Decatur Emmett			(Note: The Confederate States never adopted an official national anthem. The Civil War Trust firmly states that the "honor rightly belongs to" "God Save the South", the first piece of music published in the Confederacy, "because of its stirring poetry and its outstanding musical setting". Commonly cited alternatives include the popular song "Dixie" and "The Bonnie Blue Flag", a marching song.)
Corsican Republic	"Dio vi Salvi Regina"	"God Save Thee Queen"	1755–1769 (de facto)	Francis de Geronimo			—
Kingdom of Corsica	"Dio vi Salvi Regina"	"God Save Thee Queen"	1794–1796	Francis de Geronimo			—
Counani	"Marche triomphale de Counani"	"Triumphal March of Counani"	1890-1891	None (instrumental)	Hilarion de Croze	—	—
Creta	"Kritikos Ymnos" (Note: Greek: "Κρητικός Ύμνος")	"Cretan Anthem"	1898–1908	Ioannis Polemis	Dionysios Davrangas		—
Crimea	"Ant etkenmen"	"I Have Promised"	1917–1918	Noman Çelebicihan	probably Çelebicihan itself (traditionally believed to be folk music)	—	—
Cyrenaica	"Alnashid Alwataniu Li'Iimarat Biriqa" (Note: Arabic: "النشيد الوطني لإمارة برقة")	"The National Anthem of the Emirate of Cyrenaica"	1949–1951	Unknown		—	—
Czechoslovakia	"Kde domov můj" "Nad Tatrou sa blýska"	"Where is my home?" and "Lightning over the Tatras"	1918–1939; 1945–1993	Josef Kajetán Tyl; Janko Matúška	František Škroup; Unknown		(Note: Only the first verses of each anthem were sung during the union of the Czech lands with Slovakia.)
Danzig	"Für Danzig"	"For Danzig"	1920–1939	Paul Enderling	Georg Göhler		—
Don Republic	"Gimn Donskikh Kazakov"	"Anthem of the Don Cossacks"	1919–1921	Fyodor Ivanovich Anisimov			—
East Germany	"Auferstanden aus Ruinen"	"Arisen from Ruins"	1949–1990	Johannes R. Becher	Hanns Eisler		—
East Turkestan	"Qurtulush Yolida" (Note: Uyghur: " قۇرتۇلۇش يولیدا")	"On the Road to Salvation"	1933–1934	Mehmet Ali Tevfik	Unknown		—
Far Eastern Republic	"The Internationale"		1920-1922	Eugène Pottier	Pierre De Geyter		—
Gran Colombia	"Marcha Libertadora"	"Liberating March"	1819–1830	Unknown			—
Hanover	"Heil dir, Hannover"	"Hail to you, Hanover"	beginning of the 18th century–1866	Unknown	George Frideric Handel		—
Hyderabad	"O Osman"		1947–1948	Unknown		—	—
Hatay State	"İstiklal Marşı"	"Independence March"	1938-1939	Mehmet Akif Ersoy	Osman Zeki Üngör (composer) and Edgar Manas (orchestration)		—
Hawaii	"God Save the King"		1810–1860	Unknown			—
Hawaii	"E Ola Ke Alii Ke Akua"	"God Save the King"	1860–1866	Lunalilo	Unknown		—
Hawaii	"He Mele Lahui Hawaii"	"The Song of the Hawaiian Nation"	1866–1876	Liliuokalani	Unknown	—	—
Hawaii	"Hawaiʻi Ponoʻī"	"Hawaii's Own True Sons"	1876–1893	Kalakaua	Henri Berger		—
Taiping Heavenly Kingdom	"Tiāncháo zànměi gē"	"Ode to the Heavenly Kingdom"	?–1864	Unknown			
Ikaria	"Ύmnos Eleetheras Politeias ikarias" (Note: Greek: " Ύμνος Ελευθέρας Πολιτείας Ικαρίας")	"Anthem of the Free State of Ikaria"	1912	Frangiskos Karrer	Konstantinos Psachos	—	—
Imerina	"Andriamanitra ô! Andriamanitra ô! Tahionao ny Mpanjakanay"	"O God, bless our Queen"	?–1897	Unknown		—	—
North Ingria	"Nouse, Inkeri"	"Wake up, Ingria"	1919–1920	Mooses Putro and Paavo Räikkönen	Unknown	—	—
Katanga	"La Katangaise"	"The Katangan"	1960–1963	Unknown	Joseph Kiwele		—
Kokand	"Turkiston muxtoriyatining madhiyasi" (Note: Uzbek:ترکستان مختاریتی‌نینگ مدحیه‌سی)	"Anthem of Autonomous Turkestan"	1917–1918	Choʻlpon	No official music	—	—
Kuban	"Ty, Kuban', Ty nasha Rodina" (Note: Russian:Ты, Кубань, Ты наша Родина)	"You, Kuban, You Are Our Motherland"	1918–1920	Unknown		—	—
Latvian Socialist Soviet Republic	"Internacionāle"	"The Internationale"	1918-1920	Eugène Pottier	Pierre De Geyter		—
Los Altos	"La Granadera"	"The Grenadier"	1838–1840; 1848–1849	Rómulo Durón	Unknown		—
Luhansk People's Republic	"Himn Luganskey Narodney Respubliki" (Note: Russian:Гимн Луганской Народной Республики)	"State anthem of the Luhansk People's Republic"	2014-2016	Vladimir Mikhailov	Georgy Galin	—	—
Luhansk People's Republic	"Himn Luganskey Narodney Respubliki" (Note: Russian:Гимн Луганской Народной Республики)	"State anthem of the Luhansk People's Republic"	2016–2022	Vladimir Mikhailov	Georgy Galin	—	—
Mahabad	"Ey Reqîb" (Note: Kurdish: ئەی ڕەقیب)	"Oh Enemy"	1945–1947	Dildar	Unknown		(Note: The song "Ey Reqîb" is still used as the regional anthem of Iraqi Kurdistan, and as the anthem of the Kurdish people in general.)
Maakhir	"Soomaaliyeey toosoo"	"Somalia, Wake Up"	2007–2009	Ali Mire Awale	Ali Mire Awale; Yusuf Haji Aden	—	(Note: Served as Somalia's national anthem until 2012, when it was replaced with "Qolobaa Calankeed".)
Manchukuo	"Mǎnzhōu guó guógē" (Note: Chinese: 滿洲國國歌)	"National anthem of Manchukuo"	1933–1942	Zheng Xiaoxu	Takatsu Toshi, Sonoyama Minpei and Muraoka Gakudō		—
Manchukuo	"Mǎnzhōu guó guógē" (Note: Chinese: 滿洲國國歌)	"National anthem of Manchukuo"	1942–1945	The national anthem committee	Kosaku Yamada and Kiyoshi Nobutoki		—
Mecklenburg-Schwerin	"Gott Segne Friedrich Franz"	"God Bless Friedrich Franz"	1815-1918	Unknown			—
Mecklenburg-Strelitz	"Vandalia"		1836-1918	Johann Friedrich Bahrdt	Carl Ludwig von Oertzen	—	—
Modena and Reggio	"Gott erhalte Franz den Kaiser"	"God Save Emperor Francis"	1815-1859	Lorenz Leopold Haschka	Joseph Haydn		—
New Granada	"Al Veinte De Julio"	"The 20th of July"	1831-1858	Unknown	José Joaquín Guarín	—	—
Northern Epirus	"Hýmnos eis tin Eleutherían" (Note: Greek: "Ὕμνος εἰς τὴν Ἐλευθερίαν")	"Hymn to Liberty"	1914	Dionysios Solomos	Nikolaos Chalikiopoulos Mantzaros		—
Oldenburg	"Heil dir, o Oldenburg"	"Hail to thee, o Oldenburg"	1844–1871	Theodor von Kobbe	Cecilia, Grand Duchess of Oldenburg		
Orange Free State	"Heft, Burgers, 't lied der vrijheid"	"Sing, Citizens, the song of Freedom"	1854–1902	H. A. L. Hamelberg	W. F. G. Nicolai		
Ottoman Empire	"Mahmudiye Marşı"	"March of Mahmud"	1829–1839; 1918–1922	None (instrumental)	Giuseppe Donizetti		(Note: The last Ottoman sultan, Mehmed VI, decided not to have a special march for himself, but used the first Ottoman anthem, "Mahmudiye".)
Ottoman Empire	"Mecidiye Marşı"	"March of Abdülmecid"	1839–1861	None (instrumental)	Giuseppe Donizetti		—
Ottoman Empire	"Aziziye Marşı"	"March of Abdülaziz"	1861–1876	None (instrumental)	Callisto Guatelli	—	—
Ottoman Empire	"Hamidiye Marşı"	"March of Abdulhamid"	1876–1909	Hacı Emin Bey	Necip Paşa		—
Ottoman Empire	"Reşadiye Marşı"	"March of Mehmed Reşad"	1909–1918	Unknown	Italo Selvelli		—
Papal States	"Marcia trionfale"	"Triumphal March"	1857–1870	(instrumental only)	Viktorin Hallmayer		
Paris Commune	"La Marseillaise de la Commune"	"The Marseillaise of the Commune"	1971	Claude Joseph Rouget de Lisle	Julie Favre		—
Parthenopean Republic	"Inno alla Repubblica Partenopea"	"Hymn to the Parthenopean Republic"	1799	Unknown	Domenico Cimarosa	—	—
Persian Socialist Soviet Republic	"Anternaasionaal" (Note: Persian: "انترناسیونال")	"The Internationale"	1920-1921	Eugène Pottier; Abolqasem Lahouti (translation)	Pierre De Geyter		—
Polish–Lithuanian Commonwealth	"Gaude Mater Polonia"	"Rejoice, oh Mother Poland"	?–1795	Vincent of Kielcza	Unknown		—
Provisional Democratic Government	"Ímnos tou DSE" (Note: Greek: "Ύμνος του ΔΣΕ")	"Anthem of DSE"	1947-1949	Unknown		—	—
Prussia	"Borussia"	"Prussia"	1820–1830	Joseph Friedrich Leopold Dunker	Gaspare Spontini		—
Prussia	"Preußenlied"	"Song of Prussia"	1830–1840	Bernhard Thiersch	August Neithardt		—
Rif	"Arrif Tammurt neɣ" (Note: Tamazight: "ⴰⵔⵔⵉⴼ ⵜⴰⵎⵎⵓⵔⵜ ⵏⴰⵖ") (Note: Arabic: "الريف موطننا")	"Rif, my country"	1921-1926	Unknown		—	—
Roman Republic	"Il Canto degli Italiani"	"The Song of Italians"	1849-1850	Goffredo Mameli	Michele Novaro		—
Ryukyu	"Ishinagu no uta" (Note: Okinawan: "石なぐの歌")	"Pebble Song"	?-1879	Gushikawa Chōei		—	—
San Marco	"Inno Nasionale Veneto"	"Veneto National Anthem"	1848-1849	Unknown	Antonio Vivaldi	—	—
Sarawak	"Gone Forth Beyond the Sea"		1872–1946	Margaret Brooke	Unknown		—
Sardinia	"S'hymnu sardu nationale"	"The Sardinian National Anthem"	1842–1861	Vittorio Angius	Giovanni Gonella	—	—
Saxe-Meiningen	"Meininger Hymne"	"Anthem of Meiningen"	pre 1836–1918	Ludwig Bechstein	Richard Mühlfeld	—	—
Saxe-Weimar-Eisenach	"Weimars Volkslied"	"Weimar Folk Song"	1847-1918	Peter Cornelius	Franz Liszt	—	—
Saxony	Gott segne Sachsenland	"God save Saxony"	1815-1842	Siegfried August Mahlmann	Unknown		—
Saxony	"Sachsenlied"	"Saxon Song"	1842-1918	Maximilian Hallbauer	Ernst Julius Otto	—	
Serbia and Montenegro	"Hej, Slaveni"	"Hey, Slavs"	1992–2006	Samuel Tomášik	Michał Kleofas Ogiński		(Note: Serbia and Montenegro was called the Federal Republic of Yugoslavia until 4 February 2003.)
Serbian Krajina	"Bože pravde" (Note: Serbian: "Боже правде")	"God of Justice"	1991-1995	Jovan Đorđević	Davorin Jenko		—
Serbian Krajina	"Himna Krajini" (Note: Serbian: "Химна Крајини")	"Anthem to Krajina"	1991–1995 (Unofficial)	Unknown		—	—
Siberia	"Kantatnyy Gimn Sibiri"	"Cantata Anthem of Siberia"	1918	Anatoly Shtylov	N. Kiselev	—	—
Sikkim	"Drenjong Silé Yang Chhagpa Chilo"	"Why is Sikkim Blooming So Fresh and Beautiful?"	?–1975	Unknown		—	—
Sikh Empire	"Dēg Tēg Fateh" (Note: Punjabi:ਦੇਗ ਤੇਗ਼ ਫ਼ਤਿਹ)	"Victory to Charity and Arms"	1799–1849	Unknown		—	—
Slovak Soviet Republic	"Internacionála"	"The Internationale"	1919	Eugène Pottier	Pierre De Geyter		—
Somaliland	"National Anthem of Somaliland"		1960	None (instrumental)	R.A.Y. Mitchell	—	—
South Maluku	"Maluku, Tanah Airku"	"Maluku, My Homeland"	1950–1963	Chris Soumokil and O. Sahalessy	Unknown	—	—
Soviet Union	"Internatsional"	"The Internationale"	1922–1944	Eugène Pottier	Pierre De Geyter		—
Soviet Union	"Gosudarstvenniy Gimn SSSR" (Note: Russian: "Государственный гимн СССР")	"State anthem of the Soviet Union"	1944–1991	Sergey Mikhalkov	Alexander Alexandrov		—
Syria	"Suriyah, Ya Dhat al-Majdi" (Note: Arabic: "سوريا يا ذات المجد")	"O Syria, Who Owns the Glory"	1919–1920	Mukhtar al-Taneer	Ahmed Flayfel and Mohammed Flayfel		—
Talysh-Mughan	"Ozod Vətən"	"Free Motherland"	1993	Unknown		—	—
Tamil Eelam	"Eruthu Paar Kodi" (Note: Tamil: ஏறுதுபார் கொடி)	"Look the Flag is Rising"	1980s–2008	Puthuvai Rathinathurai	Unknown		—
Tibet	"Gyallu" (Note: Tibetan: "བོད་རྒྱལ་ཁབ་ཆེན་པོའི་རྒྱལ་གླུ།")	"Tibetan National Anthem"	c. 1950–1951	Trijang Rinpoche	Unknown (Traditional)		—
Transkei (Bantustan)	"Nkosi Sikelel' iAfrika"	"Lord Bless Africa"	1976–1994	Enoch Sontonga	Enoch Sontonga and Joseph Parry		—
Tuscany	"La Leopolda"	"The Leopolda"	1820s–1860	None (instrumental)	Egisto Mosell		—
Transvaal	"Volkslied van Transvaal"	"People's Song of the Transvaal"	1875–1902	Catharina van Rees	Catharina van Rees		
Tungus Republic	"Sargylardaah sakhalarbyt"	"Sakha covered with happiness"	1924–1925	Anempodist Sofronov	Adam Skriabin		—
Two Sicilies	"Inno al Re"	"Hymn to the King"	1816–1861	Unknown	Giovanni Paisiello		—
Tuva	"Tyva Internatsional" (Note: Tuvan: "Тыва Интернационал")	"Tuvan Internationale"	1921–1944	Unknown	Unknown (Traditional)		—
Tuva	"Tooruktug Dolgai Tañdym (Note: Tuvan: "Тооруктуг долгай таңдым")	"The Taiga Filled With Pine Nuts"	1944	Ayana Samiyayevna Mongush	Unknown (Traditional)		—
United Arab Republic	"Walla Zaman Ya Selahy" (Note: Arabic: "والله زمان يا سلاحي")	"Oh My Weapon"	1960–1971	Salah Jahin	Kamal Al Taweel		—
Venda (Bantustan)	"Pfano na vhuthihi"	"Peace and Togetherness"	1979–1994	Unknown			—
South Vietnam	"Tiếng gọi thanh niên"	"Call to the Citizens"	1955–1975	Luu Huu Phuoc, Mai Văn Bộ	Luu Huu Phuoc		(Note: The song was originally called "Thanh Niên Hành Khúc" (English: "March of the Youths"); the title and words were altered significantly when it became national anthem, though the music remained the same. Luu Huu Phuoc was still officially credited for both the music and the lyrics.)
South Vietnam	"Giải phóng miền Nam"	"Liberate the South"	1975–1976	Luu Huu Phuoc, Mai Văn Bộ, Huỳnh Văn Tiểng	Luu Huu Phuoc	—	—
Western Thrace	"Batı Trakya Milli Marşı"	"Western Thrace National Anthem"	1913	Unknown	Süleyman Askeri Bey	—	—
Württemberg	"Württemberger Hymne"	"Hymn of Württemberg"	1806–1871	Unknown	Peter Josef von Lindpaintner	—	
Kingdom of Yemen	"Tahiātin Milkiayet" (Note: Arabic: "تحية ملكية")	"Royal Salute"	1927–1962	Muhammad Ahmed Haydara	Unknown		—
North Yemen	"al Watani" (Note: Arabic: "ال وطني")	"Peace To The Land"	1962–1978	Collective	Unknown		—
North Yemen	Iiradat 'Uma (Note: Arabic: "إرادة أمة")	"A Nation's Will"	1978–1990	Ahmed Al Amari	Ali Al Ansi		—
South Yemen	"al-šīd al-ūṭnī lǧmhūrīẗ al-īmn al-dīmqrāṭīẗ al-šʿbīẗ" (Note: Arabic: "النشيد الوطني لجمهورية اليمن الديمقراطية الشعبية")	"National Anthem of the People's Democratic Republic of Yemen"	1967-1979	None (instrumental)	Abdulqader Jumaa Khan		—
South Yemen	"al-Jumhūrīyah al-Muttaḥidâh" (Note: Arabic: "الجمهورية المتحدة")	"United Republic"	1979–1989	Abdullah "Al-Fadhool" Abdulwahab Noman	Ayoob Tarish		—
Yugoslavia	"Himna Kraljevine Jugoslavije"	"Hymn of the Kingdom of Yugoslavia"	1918–1941	Jovan Đorđević; Antun Mihanović; Simon Jenko	Davorin Jenko; Josif Runjanin		(Note: It was a medley of "Bože pravde", "Lijepa naša domovino" and "Naprej, zastava slave", used by Serbia, Croatia and Slovenia respectively.)
Yugoslavia	"Hej, Slaveni"	"Hey, Slavs"	1977–1992	Samuel Tomášik	Michał Kleofas Ogiński		
Zanzibar	"National Anthem of Zanzibar"		?-1890	None (instrumental)	Unknown	—	—
Zanzibar	"National March for the Sultan of Zanzibar"		1911–1964	None (instrumental)	Donald Tovey	—	—

=== Territories ===
State	National anthem title in local language(s)	English translation of title	Period	Lyrics writer(s)	Anthem composer(s)	Audio	Notes
SSR Abkhazia	"Internatsional" (Note: Russian: "")	"The Internationale"	1921–1931	Eugène Pottier	Pierre De Geyter		—
Alsace-Lorraine	"Elsässisches Fahnenlied"	"Hymn to the Alsatian Flag"	1911-1918	Emil Woerth			—
Anhalt	"Anhalt Lied"	"Song of Anhalt"	1878-1918	Alexander von Marées	Karl Appel	—	—
Ankole	"Ensi Nkore"	"Our Land Ankole"	?-1967	Unknown		—	—
Armenian SSR	"Haykakan SSH orhnerg" (Note: Armenian: "Հայկական ՍՍՀ օրհներգ")	"Anthem of the Armenian SSR"	1944–1991	Sarmen	Aram Khachaturian		—
Azerbaijan SSR	"Azərbaycan Sovet Sosialist Respublikasının Himni" (Note: Azerbaijani: Азәрбајҹан Совет Сосиалист Республикасынын Һимни (original orthography))	"Anthem of the Azerbaijan Soviet Socialist Republic"	1945–1991	Suleyman Rustam; Samad Vurgun; Huseyn Arif	Uzeyir Hajibeyov		—
Bizone	"Trizonesien-Song"	"Trizonesia Song"	1948-1949 (unofficial)	Karl Berbuer		—	—
Brandenburg	"Brandenburglied"		1923-1936	Gustav Büchsenschütz		—	—
Byelorussian SSR	"Dzyarzhauny himn BSSR" (Note: Belarusian: "Дзяржаўны гімн БССР")	"State Hymn of the Byelorussian Soviet Socialist Republic"	1952–1991	Nestar Sakalowski	Mihas' Klimovich		—
Checheno-Ingush ASSR	"Checheno-Ingushetiya Moya" (Note: Russian: "Чечено-Ингушетия Моя")	"My Checheno-Ingushetia"	1966-1991	Nurdin Muzayev	Aleksandr Khalebskii		—
Congress Poland	Pieśń narodowa za pomyślność króla"	"National Song to the King's Well-being"	1816-1918	Alojzy Feliński	Jan Nepomucen Piotr Kaszewski	—	—
Dagestan	"Dagestan, Ty Otčizna Svyataya" (Note: Russian: "Дагестан, ты отчизна святая")	"Dagestan, You Holy Fatherland"	2003-2016	Shirvani Chalayev	Shirvani Chalayev	—	—
East Prussia	"Sie sagen all, du bist nicht schön"	"They all say, that you aren't beautiful"	late 1880s-1930s	Johanna Ambrosius	Karl Anton Guske	—	—
East Prussia	"Ostpreußenlied"	"East Prussian Song"	1930s-1945	Erich Hannighofer	Herbert Brust	—	—
Estonian SSR	"Eesti Nõukogude Sotsialistliku Vabariigi hümn"	"Anthem of the Estonian Soviet Socialist Republic"	1945–1990	Johannes Semper	Gustav Ernesaks		—
Federal Territories	"Maju dan Sejahtera"	"Progress and Prosper"	2006-2011	Datuk Wah Idris		—	—
French Cochinchina	"Chinh phụ ngâm"	"Lament of the soldier's wife"	1946-1949	Đặng Trần Côn	Võ Văn Lúa	—	—
Galicia	"Marcha do Reino de Galizia"	"March of the Kingdom of Galicia"	c.16th century-1833	Unknown		—	—
Gazankulu (Bantustan)	"Hosi Katekisa Afrika"	"God Bless Africa"	1973-1994	Enoch Sontonga			—
Georgian SSR	"Sakartvelos sabch'ota socialist'uri resp'ublikas sakhelmts'ipo himni" (Note: Georgian: "საქართველოს საბჭოთა სოციალისტური რესპუბლიკის სახელმწიფო ჰიმნი")	"State Anthem of the Georgian Soviet Socialist Republic"	1946–1990	Grigol Abashidze; Alexander Abasheli	Otar Taktakishvili		—
Georgian SSR	"Dideba" (Note: Georgian: "დიდება")	"Glory"	1990-1991	Kote Potskhverashvili			—
Greater Lebanon	"lbnān lā tẖšَ ālʿdā" (Note: Arabic: "لبنان لا تخشَ العدا")	"Lebanon, Fear Not Adversity"	1920-1927	Maroun Ghosn	Bechara Ferzan	—	—
Hesse	"Hessenlied"	"Song of Hesse"	1910–1919	Unknown	Albrechta Brede	—	—
Hong Kong	"Tin Jau Neoi Wong" (Note: Chinese: 天佑女王)	"God Save the Queen"	1841–1941; 1945–1997	Unknown			—
Jersey	"Ma Normandie"	"My Normandy"	1836-2025	Frédéric Bérat		—	—
Jersey	"Island Home"		2008-2025	Gerard Le Feuvre		—	—
Kamchatka Oblast	"Gimn Kamchatskaya oblast'" (Note: Russian "Гимн Камчатская область")	"Anthem of Kamchatka Oblast"	2004-2007	Boris Dubrovin (poet)	Evgeniy Morozov (choirmaster)		—
Karafuto Prefecture	"Karafuto tōka" (Note: Japanese: "樺太島歌")	"The song of Karafuto island"	1938-1949	Honma Issaku	Kōsaku Yamada	—	—
Karelo-Finnish SSR	"Karjalais-suomalainen SNT hymni"	"Anthem of the Karelo-Finnish SSR"	1945-1956	Armas Äikiä	Karl Rautio		—
Kazakh SSR	"Qazaq Sovettik Socïalïstik Respwblïkasınıñ memlekettik änuranı" (Note: Kazakh: "Қазақ Советтiк Социалистік Республикасының мемлекеттік әнұраны")	"Anthem of the Kazakh Soviet Socialist Republic"	1945–1992	Abdilda Tazhibaev; Sydyk Mukhamedzhanov; Gabit Musirepov	Mukan Tulebayev Yevgeny Brusilovsky Latif Khamidi		(Note: The same melody was used for the Kazakhstan national anthem in the early years of independence, before it was replaced with the current anthem, "Meniñ Qazaqstanım".)
Khakassia	"Moya Khakasiya" (Note: Russian: "Моя Хакасия")	"My Khakassia"	2007-2015	Olga Krivenko	Tatiana Shalginova	—	—
Kirghiz SSR	"Kyrgyz SSR Mamlekettik Gimni" (Note: Kirghiz: "Кыргыз ССР Мамлекеттик Гимни")	"Anthem of the Kirghiz SSR"	1936–1991	K. Malikov; T. Sydykbekov; M. Tokobaev; A. Tokombaev.	Vladimir Vlasov; Abdylas Maldybaev; Vladimir Fere		—
Latvian SSR	"Latvijas Padomju Sociālistiskās Republikas himna"	"Anthem of the Latvian Soviet Socialist Republic"	1945–1990	Fricis Rokpelnis; Jūlijs Vanags	Anatols Liepiņš		—
Lithuanian SSR	"Lietuvos Tarybų Socialistinės Respublikos himnas"	"Anthem of the Lithuanian Soviet Socialist Republic"	1950–1988	Antanas Venclova	Balys Dvarionas; Jonas Švedas		—
Lokot Autonomy	"Ot kraja i do kraja" (Note: Russian: "От края и до края")	"From land to land"	1941-1944	Ivan Dzerzhinsky			—
Lombardy-Venetia	"Inno Patriottico"	"The Patriotic Song"	1815-1867	Lorenz Leopold Haschka	Joseph Haydn		—
Louisiana	"Give Me Louisiana"		1970-2021	Doralice Fontane	John Croom	—	—
Macau	"A Portuguesa"	"The Portuguese"	1910–1999	Henrique Lopes de Mendonça	Alfredo Keil		(Note: From 1809 until 1826, the anthem of Macau was "Hymno Patriótico" followed by "Hino da Carta" (from 1826-1911), the same as that of Portugal.)
Macedonia	"Marš na makedonskite revolucioneri" (Note: Macedonian: "Марш на македонските револуционери")	"March of the Macedonian Revolutionaries"	1944	Aleksandar Morfov		—	—
Martinique	"Lorizon"		2019-2021	Rosetta Varasse		—	—
Maryland	"Maryland, My Maryland"		1939–2021	James Ryder Randall	Melchior Franck		—
Moldavian SSR	"Imnul de Stat al RSS Moldovenești" (Note: Romanian: "Имнул де Стат ал РСС Молдовенешть" (original orthography))	"State Anthem of the Moldavian SSR"	1945–1991	Emilian Bukov; Ivan Bodarev	Ștefan Neaga; Eduard Lazarev		—
Montserrat	"Montserrat, My Country"		1992-2013	Denzil Edgecombe		—	—
(Kingdom of Mysore) Mysore	"Kayo Shri Gowri" (Note: Kannada: "ಕಾಯೌ ಶ್ರೀ ಗೌರಿ")	"O Goddess Gowri"	1860s–1947	Basavappa Shastry	Unknown	—	—
(Dutch East India Company) Netherlands East Indies (Indonesia)	"Het Wilhelmus" (Note: Melayu:"Willem dari Nassou")	"The William / William of Nassau"	1932–1943	Philips of Marnix, or Dirck Coornhert or Petrus Dathenus	Adrianus Valerius		(Note: From 1815 until 1932, the anthem was "Wien Neêrlands Bloed", the same as that of the Netherlands.)
Netherlands Antilles	Anthem without a title		2000–2010	Zahira Hiliman; Lucille Berry-Haseth	Zahira Hiliman		-
Dutch New Guinea	Hai Tanahku Papua	"Oh My Land Papua"	1961–1963	Rev. Izaak Samuel Kijne	Marius Adrianus Brandts Buys sr.		—
Newfoundland	"Ode to Newfoundland"		1907–1949	Cavendish Boyle	Hubert Parry		(Note: When Newfoundland joined the Canadian Confederation in 1949, "Ode to Newfoundland" lost its status as a national anthem. The Canadian province of Newfoundland became the first to adopt a provincial anthem in 1980 when the song was readopted.)
Neutral Moresnet	"La Amikeja Marŝo"	"The Amikejo-March"	1908–1915	Unknown	Unknown (same tune as "O Tannenbaum")	—	—
Pomerania	"Pommernlied"	"Pomeranian Song"	1853-1945	Adolf Pompe	Karl August Groos	—	—
Prussia	"Freistaat Preußen Marsch"	"Free State of Prussia March"	1922–1935	None (instrumental)	Theodore Grawert		—
Republika Srpska	"Bože pravde" (Note: Serbian: "Боже правде")	"God of Justice"	1992-2008	Jovan Đorđević	Davorin Jenko		—
Reuss-Gera	"Heil unserm Fürsten, Heil!"	"Hail to our Prince, Hail!"	1871-1918	Unknown			—
Reuss-Greiz	"Gott, erhalt in deiner Gnaden unsern Fürsten, deinen Knecht"	"God, preserve in your grace our prince, your servant"	1860-1918	Julius Dietel	Joseph Haydn		—
Saarland	"Saarlandlied"	"Song of Saarland"	1947–1957	Richard Limberger	Karl Hogrebe	—	—
Sarawak	"Fair Land Sarawak"		1946–1973	FC Ogden	Dato' Haji Wan Othman		—
Sarawak	"Sarawak Bahagia"	"Happy Sarawak"	1973-1988	Unknown			—
Schaumburg-Lippe	"Heil unserm Fürsten, heil"	"Hail to our Prince, hail!"	1857-1918	Unknown			—
Slovenia	"Naprej, zastava slave"	"Forward, Flag of Glory"	1860–1989	Simon Jenko	Davorin Jenko		(Note: "Naprej, zastava slave" is still used by the Slovenian Armed Forces as its official song.)
Tajik SSR	"Gimni Respublikai Sovetii Sotsialistii Tojikiston" (Note: Tajik: "Гимни Республикаи Советии Сотсиалистии Тоҷикистон")	"State Anthem of the Tajik Soviet Socialist Republic"	1946–1994	Abolqasem Lahouti	Suleiman Yudakov		—
Travancore	"Vanchishamangalam" (Note: Malayalam: "വഞ്ചി ഭൂമി")	"The Lord of Vanchi"	1937-1947	Ulloor S. Parameswara Iyer	Unknown		—
Trieste	"Inno Di San Giusto"	"Hymn to Saint Justus"	1947–1954	Unknown		—	—
Turkmen SSR	"Türkmenistan Sowet Sosialistik Respublikasy Döwlet Gimni" (Note: Turkmen: "Түркменистан Совет Социалистик Республикасы")	"State Anthem of the Turkmen Soviet Socialist Republic"	1946-1991	"Collective"	Veli Mukhatov		—
Ukrainian SSR	"Derzhavnyy himn Ukrayinskoyi Radyanskoyi Sotsialistychnoyi Respubliky" (Note: "Ukrainian: Державний гімн Української Радянської Соціалістичної Республіки)	"State Anthem of the Ukrainian SSR"	1949–1991	Pavlo Tychyna; Mykola Bazhan	Anton Dmytrovych Lebedynets		—
Uzbek SSR	"O'zbekiston Sovet Sotsialist Respublikasining davlat madhiyasi" (Note: "Uzbek: Ўзбекистон Совет Социалист Республикасининг давлат мадҳияси (original orthography))	"State Anthem of the Uzbek Soviet Socialist Republic"	1947–1992	Timur Fattah; Turab Tula	Mutal Burkhanov		—
Virginia	"Carry Me Back to Old Virginia"		1940-1997	James Alan Bland		—	
Virginia	"Shenandoah"		2006	Unknown			—
Waldeck and Pyrmont	"Mein Waldeck"	"My Waldeck"	1879–1929	Philipp Ludwig Bunsen	Benjamin Christoph Friedrich Rose	—	—
Westphalia	"Westfalenlied"	"Westphalia Anthem"	1886-1946	Emil Rittershaus	Peter Johann Peters		—
West Prussia	"Westpreußenlied"	"West Prussian Song"	1878-1920	Unknown		—	—

== See also ==
- Historical Chinese anthems
- List of national anthems
- List of regional anthems
