= Wanke nicht, mein Vaterland =

The present-day State of Schleswig-Holstein within Germany

Wanke nicht, mein Vaterland ("Do not falter, my fatherland"), also known as Schleswig-Holstein, meerumschlungen ("Schleswig-Holstein, embraced by the sea") or Schleswig-Holstein-Lied is the unofficial anthem of Schleswig-Holstein. It was written in 1844 and presented at the Schleswiger Sängerfest. The tune was written by Carl Gottlieb Bellmann (1772–1862). The text had originally been written by Berlin-based lawyer Karl Friedrich Straß (1803–1864) but rewritten by Matthäus Friedrich Chemnitz (1815–1870) shortly before the start of the Sängerfest in order to represent the then atmosphere in a better way. The song expresses the wish for a united, independent and German Schleswig-Holstein.

== History ==
=== Middle Ages ===
Following the death of Adolphus VIII, childless duke of Schleswig and count of Holstein, in 1459 the nobility was keen to preserve the unity of both countries under the rule of one monarch. After the failure of the first attempts to find a successor, the Danish king Christian I came into consideration. In 1460, he was finally elected after having granted certain privileges to the nobility, amongst others the independence of Schleswig and Holstein from the Kingdom of Denmark. According to the Ripener Urkunde, no legal link existed between Schleswig, Holstein and Denmark, save the personal union. It furthermore assured that „dat se bliven ewich tosamende ungedelt“ ("that they [Schleswig and Holstein] remain united forever").

=== 19th century ===
After the wars of liberation against Napoleonic hegemony had caused national bankruptcy for Denmark in 1813, the population of Schleswig and Holstein were taxed stronger than the Danish populace by a currency reform. Thus, the rivalry between Germans and Danes became fiercer. The southern duchies of Holstein and Saxe-Lauenburg had already been constituent states of the Holy Roman Empire before 1806 and of the German Confederation in 1815 whereas the Duchy of Schleswig was a Danish fief with the Danish king as duke and liege.

In 1840, Danish was introduced as official language in Northern Schleswig but the attempt to make Danish equal to German in the entire duchy failed due to the assembly of estates loyal to the German cause.

=== Schleswiger Sängerfest ===
In the context of the German national movement of the 19th century, Sängerfeste (Festivals of Singers) with a political background took place throughout Germany (for example the Hambacher Fest). Following this tradition, Schleswig had its Sängerfest in 1844 where Matthäus Friedrich Chemnitz presented his song Wanke nicht, mein Vaterland, a rewritten version of a poem by Karl Friedrich Straß, in which he uttered his wish for a united, independent and German Schleswig-Holstein, which is the reason why he famously replaced the comma of Straß's version with a hyphen, thus stressing the union between both countries.

His version of the song became immensely popular during the Sängerfest and was promoted to a sort of "battle song" for freedom and independence.

=== 1848–1866 ===
Schleswig-Holstein as a Prussian Province within the German Empire

The political tensions culminated in the First Schleswig War of 1848 that ended three years later with the victory of Denmark without resolving the underlying problems. The Danish government pledged to reinstall the Danish state in its former form, thus granting every part of it the same rights.

In 1855, the Danish government designed a bilingual constitution that was rejected by the assembly of estates of Holstein and declared invalid by the Bundestag in Frankfurt three years later. In 1863, Denmark finally introduced a common constitution for both the Kingdom of Denmark and the Duchy of Schleswig. This violation of the agreement of 1851/1852 led to outrage in Germany.

As Denmark refused to abolish this constitution in 1864, the Second Schleswig War broke out, this time ending with German victory. Thereafter, Austria and Prussia administered the duchies of Schleswig, Holstein and Lauenburg together. After the Austro-Prussian War of 1866, Prussia annexed the duchies, forming the Province of Schleswig-Holstein.

== Lyrics ==
Coat of arms of Schleswig-Holstein

Schleswig-Holstein, meerumschlungen,
Deutscher Sitte hohe Wacht,
Wahre treu, was schwer errungen,
Bis ein schönrer Morgen tagt!
Schleswig-Holstein, stammverwandt,
Wanke nicht, mein Vaterland
Schleswig-Holstein, stammverwandt,
Wanke nicht, mein Vaterland!

Ob auch wild die Brandung tose,
Flut auf Flut, von Bai zu Bai:
O, lass blühn in deinem Schoße
Deutsche Tugend, deutsche Treu.
Schleswig-Holstein, stammverwandt,
Bleibe treu, mein Vaterland!
Schleswig-Holstein, stammverwandt,
Bleibe treu, mein Vaterland!

Doch wenn inn're Stürme wüten,
Drohend sich der Nord erhebt,
Schütze Gott die holden Blüten,
Die ein mildrer Süd belebt!
Schleswig-Holstein, stammverwandt,
Stehe fest, mein Vaterland!
Schleswig-Holstein, stammverwandt,
Stehe fest, mein Vaterland!

Gott ist stark auch in den Schwachen,
Wenn sie gläubig ihm vertrau'n;
Zage nimmer, und dein Nachen
Wird trotz Sturm den Hafen schau'n!
Schleswig-Holstein, stammverwandt,
Harre aus, mein Vaterland!
Schleswig-Holstein, stammverwandt,
Harre aus, mein Vaterland!

Von der Woge, die sich bäumet
Längs dem Belt am Ostseestrand,
Bis zur Flut, die ruhlos schäumet
An der Düne flücht'gem Sand. –
Schleswig-Holstein, stammverwandt,
Stehe fest, mein Vaterland!
Schleswig-Holstein, stammverwandt,
Stehe fest, mein Vaterland!

Und wo an des Landes Marken
Sinnend blinkt die Königsau,
Und wo rauschend stolze Barken
Elbwärts ziehn zum Holstengau. –
Schleswig-Holstein, stammverwandt,
Bleibe treu, mein Vaterland!
Schleswig-Holstein, stammverwandt,
Bleibe treu, mein Vaterland!

Teures Land, du Doppeleiche,
Unter einer Krone Dach,
Stehe fest und nimmer weiche,
Wie der Feind auch dräuen mag!
Schleswig-Holstein, stammverwandt,
Wanke nicht, mein Vaterland!
Schleswig-Holstein, stammverwandt,
Wanke nicht, mein Vaterland!

Translation:

Schleswig-Holstein, embraced by the sea,
Guard of German custom,
Stay faithful to what thou hast attained
Until a more beautiful morrow comes.
Schleswig-Holstein, one kin,
Do not falter, my fatherland.
Schleswig-Holstein, one kin,
Do not falter, my fatherland.

Even if the surf wildly rages,
Entailing flood over flood, from bay to bay:
O, let German virtue and German loyalty
Flourish in thy womb.
Schleswig-Holstein, one kin,
Remain faithful, my fatherland.
Schleswig-Holstein, one kin,
Remain faithful, my fatherland.

But when inner tempests rage
And the threatening North arises,
God may protect the comely blossoms
That a milder South enlivens!
Schleswig-Holstein, one kin,
Stand firm, my fatherland.
Schleswig-Holstein, one kin,
Stand firm, my fatherland.

God is strong, even in the weak,
If they faithfully believe in Him;
Never hesitate, then your dinghy
Will reach the haven, despite the tempest.
Schleswig-Holstein, one kin,
Hold out, my fatherland.
Schleswig-Holstein, one kin,
Hold out, my fatherland.

From the wave that rears up
Along the Belt on the Baltic Sea coast,
To the high tide that restlessly foams
By the shifting sand of the dunes. –
Schleswig-Holstein, one kin,
Stand firm, my fatherland.
Schleswig-Holstein, one kin,
Stand firm, my fatherland.

And where, at the country's borderland,
The river Kongeå sparkles contemplatively,
And where rustling and proud skiffs
Move up the Elbe to Holstein. –
Schleswig-Holstein, one kin,
Remain faithful, my fatherland.
Schleswig-Holstein, one kin,
Remain faithful, my fatherland.

Dear country, double oak,
Under the roof of one crown,
Stand firm and never yield,
No matter how fiercely the foe may threaten thee!
Schleswig-Holstein, one kin,
Do not falter, my fatherland.
Schleswig-Holstein, one kin,
Do not falter, my fatherland.

=== Original lyrics by Karl Friedrich Straß (1844) ===
Schleswig, Holstein, schöne Lande,
Wo mein Fuß die Welt betrat,
O, dass stets an eurem Strande
Keime wahren Glückes Saat!
Schleswig, Holstein, stammverwandt,
Haltet fest der Eintracht Band!
Schleswig, Holstein, stammverwandt,
Haltet fest der Eintracht Band!

Wie um euch die Stürme tosen,
Wogend braust die wilde Flut,
Haltet fest der Liebe Rosen,
Haltet fest der Treue Mut!
Schleswig, Holstein, stammverwandt,
Haltet fest der Eintracht Band!
Schleswig, Holstein, stammverwandt,
Haltet fest der Eintracht Band!

Gott ist stark auch in den Schwachen,
Wenn sie gläubig ihm vertrau'n,
Und ein gutgelenkter Nachen
Kann trotz Sturm den Hafen schau'n.
Schleswig, Holstein, stammverwandt,
Haltet fest der Eintracht Band!
Schleswig, Holstein, stammverwandt,
Haltet fest der Eintracht Band!

Wie die Häuser schön umkränzen
Die umbuschte alte Schlei,
Wie die Wellen silbern glänzen,
Naht oft bald ein blum'ger Mai.
Schleswig, Holstein, stammverwandt,
Haltet fest der Eintracht Band!
Schleswig, Holstein, stammverwandt,
Haltet fest der Eintracht Band!

Translation:

Schleswig, Holstein, beautiful lands,
Where my foot entered the world,
O, may on your beaches forever
Germinate the seed of true joy!
Schleswig, Holstein, one kin,
Firmly hold the band of unity!
Schleswig, Holstein, one kin,
Firmly hold the band of unity!

The storm rages,
The wild flood rages,
Hold fast, my beloved one,
Hold fast with true and loyal courage!
Schleswig, Holstein, one kin,
Firmly hold the band of unity!
Schleswig, Holstein, one kin,
Firmly hold the band of unity!

God is strong, even in weak people,
If they piously believe in Him,
And a well-steered dinghy
Can reach the haven in spite of tempests.
Schleswig, Holstein, one kin,
Firmly hold the band of unity!
Schleswig, Holstein, one kin,
Firmly hold the band of unity!

Like houses beautifully engarland
The old Schlei,
Like waves sparkle silvery,
A bloomy May will approach anon.
Schleswig, Holstein, one kin,
Firmly hold the band of unity!
Schleswig, Holstein, one kin,
Firmly hold the band of unity!

=== Explanation of the lyrics ===
The "double oak" refers to a tree with two different trunks that grows separately but is nonetheless united. "Under the roof of one crown" expresses the wish to have a common government. The "threatening north" and the "mild south" allude to Denmark and Germany respectively. The "wild surf" represents bothersome foreign influences, and "inner tempests" apply to conflicts within Schleswig.

== See also ==
- Badnerlied
- Bayernhymne
- Brandenburglied
- Elsässisches Fahnenlied
- Frankenlied
- Hessenlied
- Niedersachsenlied
- Ostpreußenlied
- Preußenlied
- Württemberger Hymne
- Zu Mantua in Banden
