= Yutang Tabonon =

Hymn
- Language: Cebuano
- English title: Beloved Land
- Composer: Charles Gounod
- Lyricist: Rudy Villanueva

"Yutang Tabonon" ("Beloved Land") is a Catholic hymn in the Cebuano language, praying for protection of the Filipino people.

The music is Charles Gounod's Marche Pontificale (1869); which is also the music of the Pontifical Anthem, the official anthem of the Pope and of the Holy See. The lyrics were written by Monsignor Rudy Villanueva. They are not a translation of either the Italian or the Latin lyrics of the Pontifical Anthem.

== See also ==
- Lupang Hinirang, the Philippines national anthem
