= Marcia trionfale =

Marcia trionfale may refer to:

- Victory March (film), a 1976 Italian drama film
- Marcia trionfale (Hallmayer), the second anthem of the Pope and of the Vatican City State
