= Antonio Allegra =

Italian organist and lyricist (1905–1969)

Antonio Allegra (1905 – 1969) was an Italian organist and lyricist. As one of the organists of St. Peter's Basilica at his time, he wrote the words to Inno e Marcia Pontificale, which was adopted in 1949 as the national anthem of the Holy See (Vatican City). The music was by Charles Gounod.
