= Pontifical Hymn =

National anthem of Vatican City

Inno Pontificio
- Sheet music for the "Papal Anthem"
- National anthem of the Vatican City
- Also known as: "Marche Pontificale" (English: "Pontifical March")
- Lyrics: Antonio Allegra (Italian, 1949); Raffaello Lavagna (Latin, 1991)
- Music: Charles Gounod, 1869
- Adopted: 1949
- Preceded by: "Gran Marcia Trionfale"

Audio sample
- U.S. Navy Band instrumental version in F major: file; help

The "Pontifical Hymn" (Italian: Inno Pontificio), also known as the "Pontifical Anthem and March" (Italian: Inno e Marcia Pontificale; Latin: Hymnus et modus militaris Pontificalis), is the anthem played to mark the presence of the Pope or one of his representatives, such as a nuncio, and on other solemn occasions. When the Vatican's flag is ceremonially raised, only the first eight bars are played.

While the Papal Anthem also serves as the national anthem of the Holy See and the Vatican City State, the Vatican stresses that it "is not to be understood as a national anthem"; it is a composition whose words and music "speak to the heart of many throughout the world who see in Rome the See of Peter."

== History ==
1949 recording in Italian.

The music was composed in 1869 by Charles Gounod, for the celebration on 11 April 1869 of Pope Pius IX's golden jubilee of priestly ordination. The purely instrumental piece in three parts, originally called "Marche pontificale" (French for "Pontifical March"), became extremely popular from its first performance. It was first performed that day at four o'clock in the afternoon with seven pontifical bands and a chorus of over one thousand soldiers.

On 16 October 1949, Pope Pius XII declared it the papal anthem, replacing Viktorin Hallmayer's "Marcia trionfale" (1857), which, being still the papal anthem when the Vatican City State was founded in 1929, had been treated also as the new state's anthem. Gounod's "Marche Pontificale" was first performed in this new role during a ceremony on Christmas Eve of 1949, one day before the opening of the Holy Year 1950. The old state anthem too was played for a last time, almost as a token of respect.

At that time, Antonio Allegra (1905–1969), who was then one of the organists of St. Peter's Basilica, wrote Italian lyrics for Gounod's music. Other lyrics have been composed for the music in various languages and by different authors. In 1991, Raffaello Lavagna of Savona (1918–2015) wrote Latin lyrics for a four-voice choir, on an arrangement by Alberico Vitalini.

== Lyrics ==
=== Italian lyrics by Allegra (1949) ===
Italian original

Roma immortale di Martiri e di Santi,
Roma immortale accogli i nostri canti:
Gloria nei cieli a Dio nostro Signore,
Pace ai Fedeli, di Cristo nell'amore.

A Te veniamo, Angelico Pastore,
In Te vediamo il mite Redentore,
Erede Santo di vera e santa Fede;
Conforto e vanto a chi combatte e crede,

Non prevarranno la forza ed il terrore,
Ma regneranno la Verità, l'Amore.

Salve Salve Roma, patria eterna di memorie
Cantano le tue glorie, mille palme e mille altari
Roma degli Apostoli, Madre guida dei redenti
Roma luce delle genti, il mondo spera te!

Salve Salve Roma la tue luce non tramonta
Vince l'odio e l'onta lo splendor di tua beltà
Roma degli Apostoli, madre guida dei redenti
Roma luce delle genti, il mondo spera te!

English translation

O Rome immortal of Martyrs and Saints,
O immortal Rome, accept our praises:
Glory in the heavens to God our Lord,
And peace to men who love Christ!

To You we come, Angelic Pastor,
In You we see the gentle Redeemer,
The Holy Heir of true and holy Faith;
Comfort and refuge of those who believe and fight.

Force and terror will not prevail,
But Truth and Love will reign.

Hail, Hail Rome, eternal homeland of memories
Your glories sing, a thousand palms and a thousand altars
Rome of the Apostles, Mother guide of the redeemed
Rome, the light of the people, the world hopes for you!

Hail, Hail Rome! your light does not go down
Hatred and shame overcomes the splendor of your beauty
Rome of the Apostles, guiding mother of the redeemed
Rome light of the people, the world hopes for you!

=== Latin lyrics by Lavagna (1991) ===
Latin original

Chorus:
O felix Roma – o Roma nobilis:
Sedes es Petri, qui Romae effudit sanguinem,
Petri cui claves datae sunt regni caelorum.
Pontifex, Tu successor es Petri;

Pontifex, Tu magister es tuos confirmans fratres;
Pontifex, Tu qui Servus servorum Dei,
hominumque piscator, pastor es gregis,
ligans caelum et terram.

Pontifex, Tu Christi es Vicarius super terram,
rupes inter fluctus, Tu es pharus in tenebris;
Tu pacis es vindex, Tu es unitatis custos,
vigil libertatis defensor; in Te potestas.

Vox acuta, vox altera ab acuta:
Tu Pontifex, firma es petra, et super petram
hanc aedificata est Ecclesia Dei.

Vox media, vox gravis:
Pontifex, Tu Christi es Vicarius super terram,
rupes inter fluctus, Tu es pharus in tenebris;
Tu pacis es vindex, Tu es unitatis custos,
vigil libertatis defensor; in Te potestas.

Chorus

O felix Roma – O Roma nobilis.

English translation

Chorus:
O happy Rome - O noble Rome
You are the seat of Peter, who shed his blood in Rome,
Peter, to whom the keys of the kingdom of heaven were given.
Pontiff, You are the successor of Peter;

Pontiff, You are the teacher, you confirm your brethren;
Pontiff, You who are the Servant of the servants of God,
and fisher of men, are the shepherd of the flock,
linking heaven and earth.

Pontiff, You are the vicar of Christ on earth,
a rock amidst the waves, You are a beacon in the darkness;
You are the defender of peace, You are the guardian of unity,
watchful defender of liberty; in You is the authority.

Sopranos, altos:
Pontiff, you are the unshakable rock, and on this rock
was built the Church of God.

Tenors, basses:
Pontiff, You are the vicar of Christ on earth,
a rock amidst the waves, You are a beacon in the darkness;
You are the defender of peace, You are the guardian of unity,
watchful defender of liberty; in You is the authority.

Chorus

O happy Rome - O noble Rome.

=== Current In-use Latin lyrics (Modified version of 1991 lyrics) ===
O felix Roma, O felix Roma nobilis.
O felix Roma, Roma felix Roma nobilis.
Sedes es Petri, qui Christi vicem gerit,
Sedes es Petri, qui apostolus est pacis.

𝄆 Pontifex tecum erimus omnes nos
Pontifex es magister qui tuos confirmas fratres. 𝄇

Pontifex fundamentum ac robur nostrum,
Hominumque piscator pastor es gregis ligans terram et coelum.

𝄆 Petre, tu es Christi es Vicarius super terram,
Rupes inter fluctus, tu es pharus ac veritas.
Tu Christi es caritas, tu es unitatis custos,
Promptus libertatis defensor; in te auctoritas. 𝄇

O Roma nobilis – O Roma felix nobilis. (Note: The alternative Latin lyrics can be found in the images in each of the part links.)

== See also ==
- Index of Vatican City-related articles
