= National anthem of Manchukuo =

The National anthem of Manchukuo was one of the many national symbols of independence and sovereignty created to foster a sense of legitimacy for Manchukuo in both an effort to secure international diplomatic recognition and to foster a sense of nationalism among its inhabitants.

During Manchukuo's 13-year existence, two national anthems were used.

The National anthem of Manchukuo was widely taught in schools and used in ceremonies in Manchukuo.

== 1932 proposed version ==
大滿洲國國歌(1932)
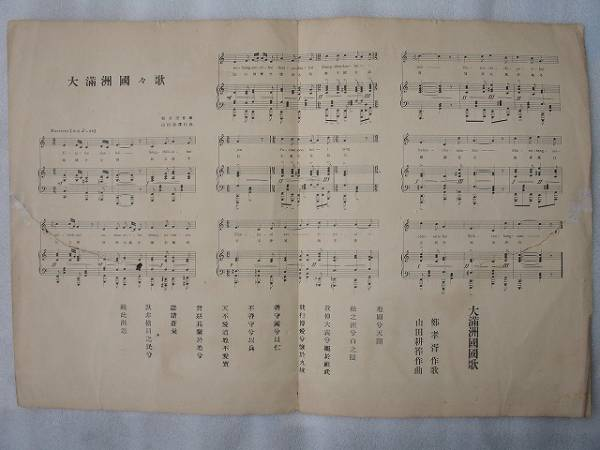
- Sheet music
- Proposed anthem of Manchukuo
- Lyrics: Zheng Xiaoxu
- Music: Kosaku Yamada
- Adopted: May 1932

External audio
- (Music only)
- 最初の満州国国歌《大滿洲國國歌》The first national anthem of Manchukuo(1932)《大滿洲建國歌》(大同元年版)

It is unclear when Manchuria began its first national anthem production, but it seems that preparations had already begun around the Manchuria National Declaration on March 1, 1932. On May 21, 1932, the Manchuria Sports Association formally applied to the Organizing Committee of the Olympics to dispatch players to the Los Angeles Olympics (held in July 1932). The Organizing Committee urges the Manchuria country to apply to the International Olympic Committee as “participation is approved by the International Olympic Committee (IOC)” and informs the Organizing Committee to send the national flag and national anthem, they have done it. On the other hand, there is still a record that the Manchuria Sports Association sent a document stating that “the national flag and national anthem were sent to the organizing committee” to the secretary general of the Olympic organizing committee. Before May, the song was completed.

However, the line "a country good at defense uses humaneness, a country bad at defense uses military force." upset the Kwantung Army, and the lyrics written in Classical Chinese were too difficult to be understood by the ordinary citizens, the drafted anthem was not favored.

Traditional Chinese	Pinyin	English translation
地闢兮天開	Dì pì xī tiān kāi	The universe created and opened up the heaven and ground
松之涯兮白之隈	Sōng zhī yá xī Bái zhī wēi	Along the Songhua River and Changbai Mountain
我伸大義兮繩於祖武	Wǒ shēn dàyì xī shéng yú zǔwǔ	We practice the righteousness, which can be traced to our ancestors
我行博愛兮懷於九垓	Wǒ xíng bó'ài xī huái yú jiǔgāi	We promote fraternity, to the end of the universe
善守國兮以仁	Shàn shǒu guó xī yǐ rén	A country good at governance relies on benevolence
不善守兮以兵	Bùshàn shǒu xī yǐ bīng	A country bad at governance relies on military force
天不愛道地不愛寶	Tiān bù ài dào dì bù ài bǎo	The heaven would be tranquil and the ground would present its goods
貨惡其棄於地兮獻諸蒼昊	Huò wù qí qì yú dì xī xiàn zhū cānghào	Treasures would be presented instead of being left in the ground
何非橫目之民兮祝此浩造	Hé fēi héngmù zhī mín xī zhù cǐ hào zào	Isn't the human race who have witnessed this grand achievement

Interpretation by author, Zheng Xiaoxu

* Praise the grandeur of the Songhua River and the Changbai Mountains.

- Explains the origins of the founding of the nation, stating that the state was established by following our ancestors.
- Proclaims to the world the principle of universal benevolence, namely the spirit of nation-building based on the Kingly Way.
- Emphasizes the difference of benevolence and martial force.
- States the principles of open doors and equal opportunity, calling upon friendly nations to help develop our treasure troves, to coexist and prosper together, and to advance the welfare of humankind.
- Finally, declares to the entire world that all peoples of all nations should be equal, and calls for joint effort and courageous progress in this great achievement, to build a land of happiness.

== 1933 version ==
滿洲國國歌
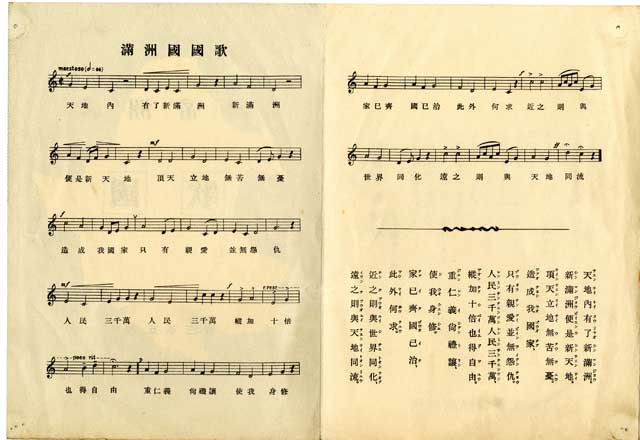
- Sheet music
- National anthem of Manchukuo
- Lyrics: Zheng Xiaoxu
- Music: Takatsu Toshi, Sonoyama Minpei, Muraoka Gakudō
- Adopted: March 1, 1933
- Relinquished: September 5, 1942

Audio sample
- National Anthem of Manchukuo: file; help

The first national anthem was declared by State Council Decree No.4, dated 24 February Dàtóng 2 (1933) but publicized on March 1. The lyrics were written by Manchukuo's first Prime Minister Zheng Xiaoxu, who was a devout Confucianist and Qing loyalist in addition to being an accomplished poet and calligrapher.

Traditional Chinese	Pinyin	English translation
天地內，有了新滿洲。	Tiān dì nèi, yǒu liǎo xīn mǎnzhōu.	(Now) on Earth, there is the new Manchuria,
新滿洲，便是新天地。	Xīn mǎnzhōu, biàn shì xīn tiān dì.	This new Manchuria is our new homeland.
頂天立地，無苦無憂，造成我國家。	Dǐng tiān lì dì, wú kǔ wú yōu, zào chéng wǒ guójiā.	Let us make our country upright and free of sadness.
只有親愛並無怨仇，	Zhǐ yǒu qīn'ài bìng wú yuànchóu,	With only love and without hatred,
人民三千萬，人民三千萬，	Rénmín sān qiān wàn, rénmín sān qiān wàn,	Thirty million people, thirty million people,
縱加十倍也得自由。	Zòng jiā shí bèi yě dé zìyóu.	at ten times more we would still be free.
重仁義，尚禮讓，使我身修；	Zhòng rényì, shàng lǐràng, shǐ wǒ shēn xiū;	With virtue and rite, rectified am I;
家已齊，國已治，此外何求。	Jiā yǐ qí, guó yǐ zhì, cǐwài hé qiú.	with the family in order and the state well-ruled, there is nothing else I want.
近之則與世界同化，	Jìn zhī, zé yǔ shìjiè tónghuà,	In the present, may we assimilate with the world;
遠之則與天地同流。	Yuǎn zhī, zé yǔ tiāndì tóng liú.	In the future, we shall resemble the Heavens and Earth.

Instrumental
Midi rendition of the 1933 version.

== 1942 version ==
滿洲國國歌
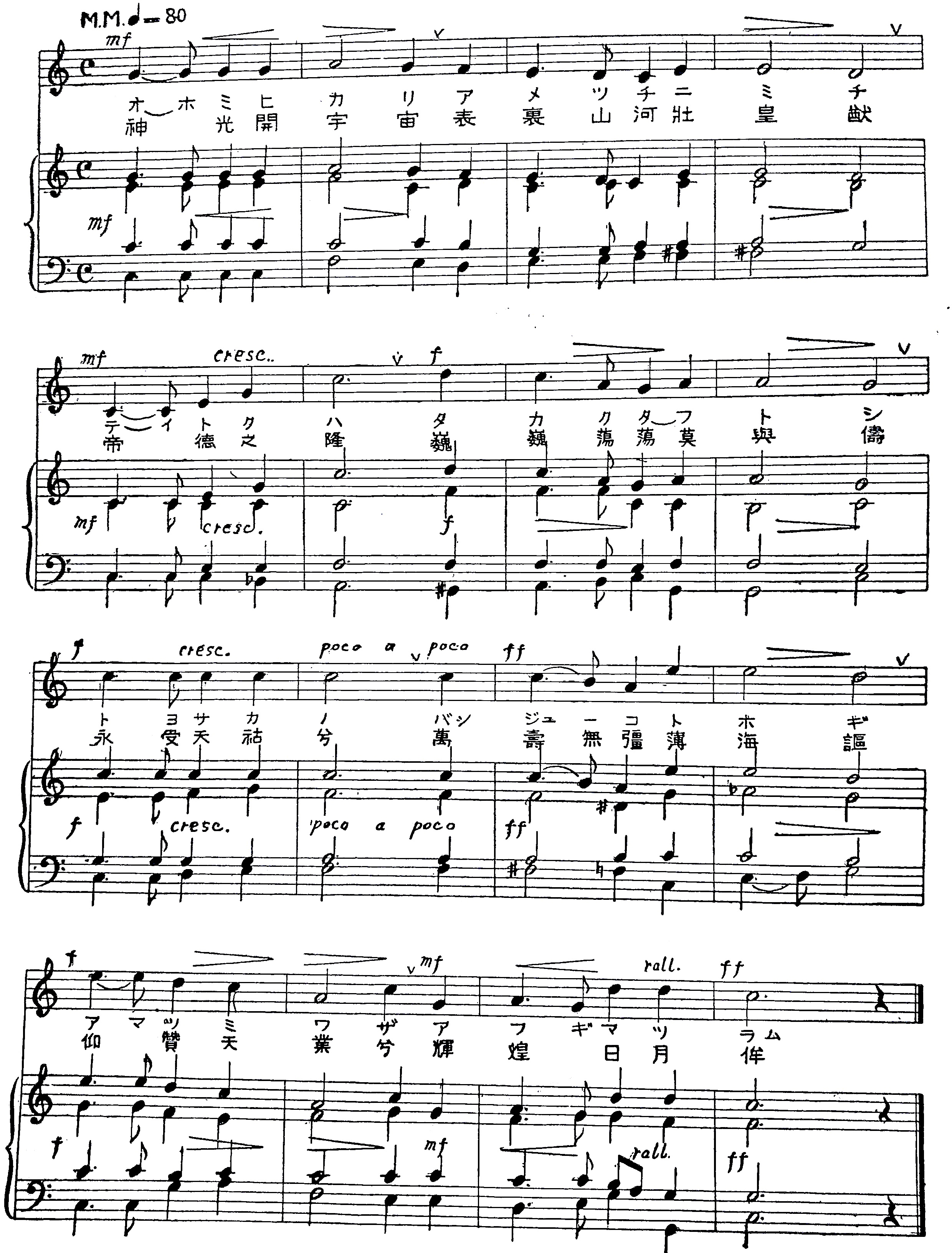
- Sheet music
- National anthem of Manchukuo
- Lyrics: The national anthem committee
- Music: Kosaku Yamada, Kiyoshi Nobutoki
- Adopted: September 5, 1942
- Relinquished: August 9, 1945

Audio sample
- National Anthem of Manchukuo (Japanese): file; help

The national anthem was changed on 5 September Kāngdé 9 (1942), by State Council Order No. 201. Prime Minister of Manchukuo Zhang Jinghui cited the 1933 version of the anthem was unsuitable for the current situations of the Empire as the reason for the change. The new anthem, with Manchurian (i.e. Mandarin Chinese) and Japanese lyrics, was written by a committee, according to Zhang. The 1933 anthem was renamed the Manchukuo Independence Song (滿洲國建國歌, pinyin: Mǎnzhōuguó jiàn guógē, Japanese Hepburn romanization: Manshukoku-kenkoku uta).

=== Lyrics ===
Traditional Chinese	Pinyin	English translation
神光開宇宙 表裏山河壯皇猷	Shén guāng kāi yǔzhòu, biǎolǐ shānhé zhuàng huáng yóu	With the Universe created in God's Light, the vast land strengthens the Emperor's rule;
帝德之隆 巍巍蕩蕩莫與儔	Dì'dé zhī lóng wēiwēi dàngdàng mò yǔ chóu	So full is His virtue, so wide that it is beyond compare
永受天祐兮 萬壽無疆薄海謳	Yǒng shòu tiān yòu xī, wànshòuwújiāng bó hǎi ōu	May He always receive divine guidance, with his years surpassing the sea;
仰贊天業兮 輝煌日月侔	Yǎng zàn tiān yè xī, huīhuáng rì yuè móu	[Let us] worship the divine work, its glory equals the sun and moon.
Japanese	Hepburn romanization	English translation
大(おほ)御(み)光(ひか)り天地(あめつち)に滿(み)ち	Ōmi-hikari ametsuchi ni michi	Filling the world with Divine light,
帝德(ていとく)は貴(たか)く尊(たふと)し	Teitoku wa takaku tōtoshi	The Emperor's virtue is noble and worshipped.
豐榮(とよさか)の萬壽(ばんじゆ)言(こと)祝(ほ)ぎ	Toyosaka no banju kotohogi	Let us salute him with long life and prosperity
天(あま)つ御(み)業(わざ)仰(あふ)ぎ祭(まつ)らむ	Amatsu-miwaza aogimatsuran	And we revere the Emperor's deeds

=== Official Interpretation ===
According to the official interpretation of the anthem issued on the same day of its adoption, the "God" in the first line of the Chinese version refers to Amaterasu, the sun goddess in Shinto, referring to Manchukuo's adoption of State Shinto as its state religion in 1940. Also, God's Light is interpreted as Arahitogami, i.e. Emperor of Japan. The whole of the first line is interpreted as

with this Divine Light, the Universe is created, and the bright and peaceful (it used the kanji 昭和, cognate of Shōwa, for bright and peaceful.) Light fills and shines over our Manchurian land and rivers, and with that we have our independence and our successes after independence. His Majesty the Emperor (i.e. Kangde) received this Divine Light to rule our country and to love our citizens. The first line [...] is an ode to our state.

"The Divine Work" in the fourth line came from Kangde's Imperial Rescript on the Tenth Anniversary of the Nation on 1 March 1942, in which he mentioned,

We should sharpen our mind and spirits to sacrifice to the holy Greater East Asia War and help in the Divine Work of our Parent Nation...

and hence interpreted as:

This line describes the determination of our citizens. The Imperial Message on March 1 stated "[to] help in the Divine Work of the Parent Nation," and the Divine Work of Japan, our Parent Nation, is to revitalize East Asia and to create the Co-prosperity Sphere[...] Our country is the pioneer in the prosperity of East Asia[...] Our citizens should revere this Divine Work of our Parent Nation and to help it in all our endeavors, to finalize the goal of our independence, to rebuild the world, and that the Divine Work maybe as large and permanent as the sun and the moon.
