= State Anthem of the Luhansk People's Republic =

Anthem of the Luhansk People's Republic

Государственный гимн Луганской Народной Республики
English: "State Anthem of the Luhansk People's Republic"
- Coat of arms of the Luhansk People's Republic
- Regional anthem of the Luhansk People's Republic
- Lyrics: Vladimir Mikhailov
- Music: Grigory Galin
- Published: 29 April 2016

The State Anthem of the Luhansk People's Republic is the regional anthem of the Luhansk People's Republic, a disputed republic of Russia. It was previously the national anthem of the LPR from 2016 until 2022 when it initially operated as a breakaway state until it was annexed by Russia in 2022, an action unrecognised by most countries. Its lyrics were written by Vladimir Mikhailov, and the music was composed by Grigory Galin.

== History ==
In July 2015 work on the selection for the National Anthem of the Luhansk People's Republic began. The Ministry of Culture and the People's Council held a competition. A total of 64 proposals were submitted for the competition for consideration by the jury. The competition was held in three stages. People submitted complete works with words and melody, and individual components. The works were evaluated by important cultural figures of the LPR, as well as deputies of the People's Council Denis Miroshnichenko, Dmitry Sidorov, and Maxim Dersky.

A previous anthem was adopted in 2014, and is alternatively known as "Луганской Народной Республике - Слава!" (To the Lugansk People's Republic - Glory!) after the first line of its chorus.

The names Vladimir Mikhailov, and Georgy Galin were the pseudonyms of Vladimir Zaitsev and Yuri Dersky, who were co-chairmen for the jury of the competition.

At the plenary session of the People's Council on April 29, 2016, the Head of the Luhansk People's Republic, Igor Plotnitsky, approved the official anthem of the LPR.

Dmitry Sidorov said "Finally, we have our own anthem. This is the component that was missing. Now we have all the state symbols in full. This is the next step towards ensuring that the Luhansk People's Republic is a truly international subject of law".

== Lyrics ==
=== Current anthem (2016–present) ===
Russian official

I
Над тобою победы знамёна
Развеваются тысячи лет,
Наша Родина непобеждённых,
Кто оставил в истории след!
Пусть гремят ещё грозы над краем,
Мы стояли на том и стоим:
Славу предков своих оправдаем —
Дело правое! Мы — победим!

Припев:
Луганская Народная
Республика свободная!
Свет солнца восходящего,
И сотни нелёгких дорог.
Луганская Народная
Республика свободная!
С нами сила земли,
С нами воля людей,
С нами Бог!

II
Мы трудом своим землю прославим,
Мы потомков достойных взрастим.
Наша Родина, наша Держава.
Твоё имя в сердцах сохраним.
И освятится сила народа
В наш единый и крепкий союз.
Будет братство в нём, честь и свобода,
И Соборная, славная Русь!

Припев

Russian Latin alphabet

I
Nad toboju pobedy znamëna
Razvevajutsja tysjači let,
Naša Rodina nepobeždënnych,
Kto ostavil v istorii sled!
Pustʹ gremjat eščë grozy nad kraem,
My stojali na tom i stoim:
Slavu predkov svoih opravdaem —
Delo pravoe! My — pobedim!

Pripev:
Luganskaja Narodnaja
Respublika svobodnaja!
Svet solnca voschodjaščego,
I sotni nelëgkich dorog.
Luganskaja Narodnaja
Respublika svobodnaja!
S nami sila zemli,
S nami volja ljudej,
S nami Bog!

II
My trudom svoim zemlju proslavim,
My potomkov dostojnych vzrastim.
Naša Rodina, naša Deržava.
Tvoë imja v serdcach sochranim.
I osvjatitsja sila naroda
V naš edinyj i krepkij sojuz.
Budet bratstvo v nëm, čest' i svoboda,
I Sobornaja, slavnaja Rus'!

Pripev

IPA transcription

I
[ˈnat taˌbojʲu paˈbʲɛdɨ ˌznaˌmʲoˌna]
[rʌzvʲivˈɑj͡ut͡sjʲa ˈtɨsʲat͡ʂʲi ˈlʲɛt]
[ˌnaʂa ˈrodʲina ˌnʲɛˌpoˌbʲɛʐdʲˌonnɨx]
[ˌkto aˈstavʲil f ɨˈstorʲii ˈsʲlʲɛt]
[ˌpusʲtʲ ɡrʲˈɛmʲat jʲɛˈʂʲo ɡraˈzɨ ˈnat ˌkraˌjʲɛm]
[ˌmɨ staˈjʲalʲi na ˈtom ˌɨ staˈim]
[ˈslavu prʲˈɛtkaf svaˌix apravˈdajʲɛm]
[dʲˈɛla ˈpravajʲɛ ˌmɨ ˌpoˌbʲɛˌdʲim]

[prʲɪ.ˈpʲɛf]:
[ˌluˌɡanˌskaˌjʲa naˈrodnajʲa]
[rʲɛspˈublʲika svaˈbodnajʲa]
[ˈsvʲɛt ˈsont͡sa vasxadʲˈaʂʲɛva]
[ˌi ˈsotʲnʲi nʲɛˈlʲoxʲkʲix daˈrok]
[ˌluˌɡanˌskaˌjʲa naˈrodnajʲa]
[rʲɛspˈublʲika svaˈbodnajʲa]
[s ˌnamʲi ˈsʲila ˈzʲɛmlʲi]
[s ˌnamʲi ˈvolʲa lʲuˈdʲɛjʲ]
[s ˌnamʲi ˈbok]

II
[ˌmɨ truˈdom svaˌim ˈzʲɛmlʲu praˈslavʲim]
[ˌmɨ paˈtomkaf daˈstojʲnɨx vzraˈsʲtʲim]
[ˌnaʂa ˈrodʲinaˌnaʂa dʲɛrʐˈava]
[tvaˌjʲo ˈɨmʲa f sʲɛrˈt͡st͡sax saxraˈnʲim]
[ˌi ˌoˌsvʲatʲˌit͡sjʲa ˈsʲila ˌnaˌroˌda]
[f ˈnaʂ jʲɛdʲˈinɨjʲ ˌɨ krʲˈɛpkʲijʲ saˈjʲus]
[ˈbudʲɛd ˈbrat͡st͡stva f ˌnʲomˈt͡ʂʲɛsʲtʲ ˌɨ svaˈboda]
[ˌi saˈbornajʲaˈslavnajʲa ˈrusʲ]

[prʲɪ.ˈpʲɛf]:

English

I
Above you are the banners of victory
Wafting for thousands of years,
Our homeland of unbeatable,
Who has made a mark in history!
Let more thunders roll over the land,
We stood for it and still stand:
We`ll rejustify our forefather's glory
It`s Just! We`ll be victorious!

Chorus:
Luhansk People`s
Republic is free!
Light of the rising sun,
and hundreds of tough roads.
Luhansk People`s
Republic is free!
With us is the power of the land,
With us is the will of the people,
God is with us!

II
We`ll glorify our land by effort,
We`ll produce worthy descendants.
Our homeland (motherland), Our [great] Nation.
Your name we`ll in our hearts shall keep.
And the power of the people shall be sacred
To our unified and sturdy union.
There`ll be brotherhood, honor, and freedom,
And the 'Sobornial', glorious Rus!

Chorus:

=== Previous anthem (2014–2016) ===
Russian Cyrillic	Transliteration	English Translation
1 куплет: Земля моя щедрая, сердце Донбасса, Мой добрый родительский дом! Как хочется мне лик твой светлый прекрасный и словом согреть и трудом! Всё есть у тебя - реки, нивы и степи и твой работящий народ! Поют тебе птицы в сияющем небе и нежно алеет восход! Припев: Луганской Народной Республике слава в стремленьи К свободе достойный пример! Ты счастье своё заслужила по праву, Живи и цвети, молодая держава, живи и цвети, ЛНР!	1 Kuplet: Zelmya moya shedraya, serdtse Donbassa, Moy dobriy roditelskiy dom! Kak khochetsya mne lyk tvoy svetley prekrasney y snovom sorget' y trudom! Vse est' u tebya - reky, nyve y stepy y tvoy rabotyazhyy narod! Poyut tebe ptytse v siyayoushem nebe y nesno aleyet voskhod! Pripev: Luganskoy Narodnoy Respublike slava, v stremeni K svobode dostoyney primer! Te schastse svoye zaslushylya po pravu, Zhivi y sveti, molodaya derzhava, zhivi i sveti, LNR!	1st verse: My humble land is the heart of Donbass, the kind home of my parents! How I yearn for your bright splendor to be glorified by word and labor! You have every thing you need - rivers, fields, and steppes, and your hardworking people! Birds sing to you from the shining sky, and the sunrise proudly reddens for you! Chorus: To the Luhansk People's Republic, Glory! A worthy example in the pursuit of freedom! You have earned your happiness, it is your right, Live and blossom, young nation, live and blossom, LPR!
2 куплет: В суровое время, в лихую годину была ты сильна и строга, но дети твои общим небом единым с тобой побеждали врага! Я знаю теперь под напором могучим всё зло обращается в тлен, а скрывшие солнце свинцовые тучи разгонят ветра перемен! Припев: Луганской Народной Республике слава в стремленьи К свободе достойный пример! Ты счастье своё заслужила по праву, Живи и цвети, молодая держава, живи и цвети, ЛНР!	2 Kuplet: V surovoe vremja, v lihuju godinu byla ty sil'na i stroga, no deti tvoi obshhim nebom edinym s toboj pobezhdali vraga! Ja znaju teper' pod naporom moguchim vsjo zlo obrashhaetsja v tlen, a skryvshie solnce svincovye tuchi razgonjat vetra peremen! Pripev: Luganskoy Narodnoy Respublike slava, v stremeni K svobode dostoyney primer! Te schastse svoye zaslushylya po pravu, Zhivi y sveti, molodaya derzhava, zhivi i sveti, LNR!	2nd verse: Through severe and hard times, you always remained strong and stubborn, And your children, through a collective outrage, defeated the enemy with you! I know now, that under great pressure, all evil turns to mere ash! These clouds of lead that have blocked out the sun will be dispersed by the winds of change! Chorus: To the Luhansk People's Republic, Glory! A worthy example in the pursuit of freedom! You have earned your happiness, it is your right, Live and blossom, young nation, live and blossom, LPR!
3 куплет: Немало усилий республике нашей в грядущем придётся свершить, чтоб стать настоящею полною чашей всем тем, кто достоин здесь жить! И всё же Всевышним во веки хранима, бесчётно ты встретишь зарю, земля моя нива, много раз твоё имя торжественно я повторю! Припев: Луганской Народной Республике слава в стремленьи К свободе достойный пример! Ты счастье своё заслужила по праву, Живи и цвети, молодая держава, живи и цвети, ЛНР!	3 kuplet: Nemalo usilij respublike nashej v grjadushhem pridjotsja svershit', chtob stat' nastojashheju polnoju chashej vsem tem, kto dostoin zdes' zhit'! I vsjo zhe Vsevyshnim vo veki hranima, beschjotno ty vstretish' zarju, zemlja moja niva, mnogo raz tvojo imja torzhestvenno ja povtorju! Pripev: Luganskoy Narodnoy Respublike slava, v stremeni K svobode dostoyney primer! Te schastse svoye zaslushylya po pravu, Zhivi y sveti, molodaya derzhava, zhivi i sveti, LNR!	3rd verse: Our Republic will need to accomplish many great deeds in the years to come, So that it can become a truly full bowl to those who are worthy to live here! And yet, for eternity, under the Almighty's guard, you will meet uncountable dawns! You are my land, many races are tied to it, and I will always repeat this triumphantly! Chorus: To the Luhansk People's Republic, Glory! A worthy example in the pursuit of freedom! You have earned your happiness, it is your right, Live and blossom, young nation, live and blossom, LPR!
