= Westpreußenlied =

"Westpreußenlied" (English: West Prussia Song) was the anthem of the Prussian province of West Prussia from 1901 to its dissolution in 1920. The song was composed in 1901 by composer Paul Felske.

== Lyrics ==
I. Westpreußen, mein lieb' Heimatland,
Wie bist du wunderschön!
Mein ganzes Herz, dir zugewandt,
Soll preisend dich erhöh'n.
Im Weichselgau ich Hütten bau,
Wo Korn und Obst der Flur entsprießt,
Wo Milch und Honig fließt.
Wo Korn und Obst der Flur entsprießt,
Wo Milch und Honig fließt.

II. O Land, durch Deutsche Tüchtigkeit
Und Deutschen fleiß erblüht,
dir schwört mein Herz ergebenheit
Und Treue mein Gemüt.
Durch Deutsche Kraft und Wissenschaft,
Sei Deutsches Wesen, Deutsche Art
Dir alle Zeit gewahrt
Sei deutsches Wesen, Deutsche Art
Dir alle Zeit gewahrt!

Translation:

I. West Prussia, my lovely homeland,
You are so beautiful!
My whole heart directed at you,
Shall exalt you with praisings.
On the Vistula district, I build cabins,
Where grain and fruit spout from the fields,
Where milk and honey flows.
Where grain and fruit spout from the fields,
Where milk and honey flows.

II. O Land, through German efficiency
And German diligence, made to blossom,
To you, my heart pledges devotion
and Loyalty my soul
Through German strength and science,
Be German nature, German custom
Forever kept to you.
Be German nature, German custom
Forever kept to you.
