= Salut à toi, pays de nos aïeux =

National anthem of Togo

Terre de nos aïeux
English: Land of our forefathers
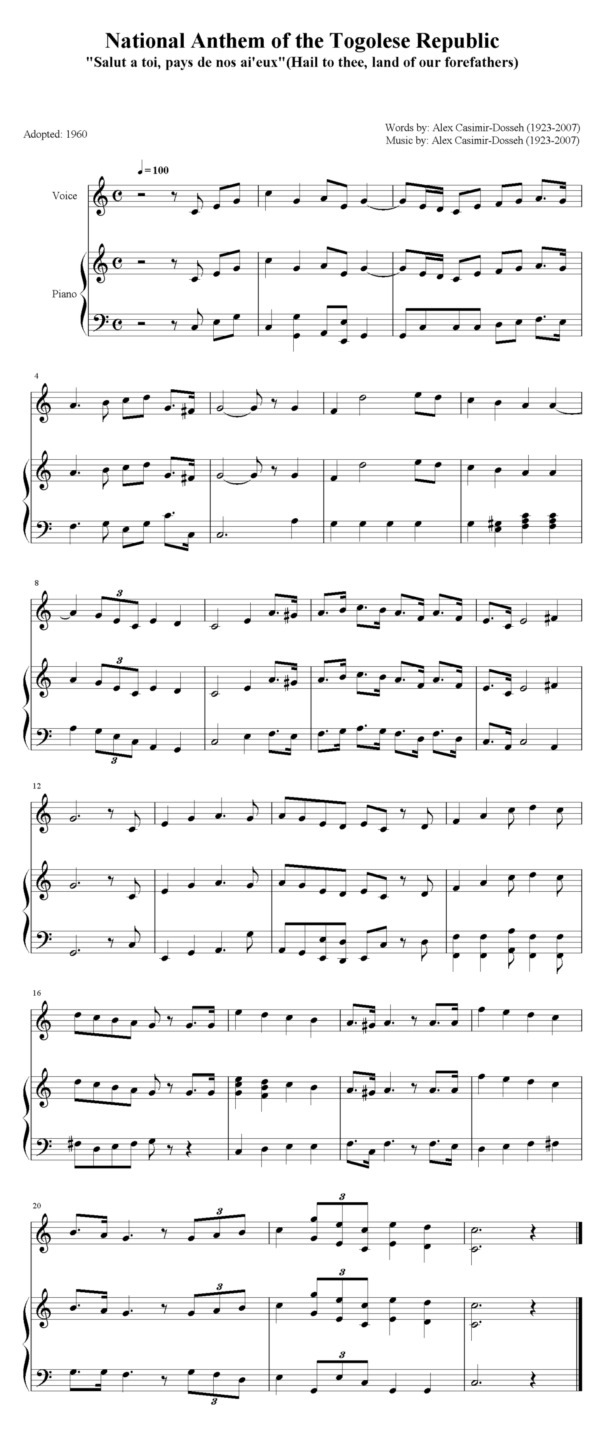
- National anthem of Togo
- Lyrics: Alex Casimir-Dosseh, 1960
- Music: Alex Casimir-Dosseh, 1960
- Adopted: 1960
- Readopted: 1992
- Relinquished: 1979

Audio sample
- U.S. Navy Band instrumental version: file; help

"Terre de nos aïeux" (English: "Land of our forefathers") is the national anthem of Togo. The words and music were written by Alex Casimir-Dosseh, and it was the national anthem from independence in 1960 until 1979. In 1979, it was replaced in its capacity by a different composition created by the party of the Rally of the Togolese People. It was readopted in 1992.

== Lyrics ==
French lyrics

I
Salut à toi pays de nos aïeux,
Toi qui les rendait forts, paisibles et joyeux,
Cultivant vertu, vaillance,
Pour la postérité. (Note: Sometimes written prospérité ('prosperity').)
Que viennent les tyrans, ton cœur soupire vers la liberté.
Togo debout, luttons sans défaillance.
Vainquons ou mourons, mais dans la dignité.
Grand Dieu, toi seul nous a exaltés
Du Togo pour la prospérité.
Togolais viens, bâtissons la cité.

II
Dans l’unité nous voulons te servir,
C’est bien là de nos cœurs, le plus ardent désir.
Clamons fort notre devise,
Que rien ne peut ternir.
Seul artisan de ton bonheur, ainsi que de ton avenir,
Brisons partout les chaînes de la traîtrise,
Et nous te jurons toujours fidélité
Et aimer servir, se dépasser,
Faire encore de toi sans nous lasser,
Togo chéri, l’or de l’humanité.

III
Salut, salut à l'Univers entier.
Unissons nos efforts sur l'immense chantier
D'où naîtra toute nouvelle
La Grande Humanité.
Partout au lieu de la misère, apportons la félicité.
Chassons du monde la haine rebelle.
Finis l'esclavage et la captivité.
À l'étoile de la liberté,
Renouons la solidarité
Des nations dans la fraternité.

English translation

I
Hail to you, land of our forefathers,
You who made them strong, peaceful and happy,
Cultivating virtue, valour
For posterity.
Should tyrants come, may your heart long for freedom.
Togo arise, let us fight without faltering.
Victory or death, but in dignity.
God almighty, You alone have exalted us
From Togo for prosperity.
Togolese come, let us build the state.

II
In unity we want to serve you,
It is indeed the most burning desire of our hearts.
Let us loudly proclaim our motto,
Which nothing can tarnish.
Sole architect of your happiness, as well as your future,
Let us break the chains of treachery everywhere,
And we swear loyalty to you always,
And to love to serve, to surpass ourselves,
To make you yet, without tiring,
Dear Togo, the gold of humanity.

III
Hail, hail to the entire universe.
Let us unite our efforts on the immense building site
From which will be reborn completely anew
Great Humanity.
Everywhere, instead of misery, let us bring happiness.
Let us chase from the world rebellious hatred.
Slavery and captivity is over.
To the star of liberty,
Let us renew the solidarity
Of nations in fraternity.

=== In local languages ===
Ewe lyrics

I
Mie dogbe na wò tɔ gbui wo nyigbã
Wòe na nutifafa ŋusē kple dzidzo wo
Wòe de kalē kple vudɔdɔ
Dzidzime vi wo me
Ne ŋutasē la wo va hã wò la wò dzidi ablɔɖe
Togo tsitre mi na mia ʋli nusētɔe
Mia ɖudzi alo mia ku boŋ kple bubu
Mawu gã wò koe do mi ɖedzi
Be Togo na yi ŋgo dedie la
Togo vi va Mia tu denyigbã la.

Kabiye lyrics

I
Di zeng ɖéou dɛ tsɔzɔna tētu
Nyɛ yɔ̀ bèwè dõng, hɛ̀ziè nē hlɔmièda
Ŋ'hawè kɩbandʋ nè abaletʋ,
Hɩdèzena kigbeleketʋ
Awiyaa nyazia ɛ̀kpang sondʋ, pɛye lila kamnya languiɛ̀da
Togo kouyi ñ'seng, ɖ'louki nyɛ yɔ̀ kalɛ̀tʋ
Pa ɖ'waba ya ɖ'dewa, ɖ'wēna kadɩ nyamtou
[Es]'so sʋsso nyédeké se ɖiiyu nèdʋ
Se Togo ɛwobina ɛ̀sinda
Togo boua kò édima dè ɛdzarè.

== History ==
=== Rally of the Togolese People-era national anthem ===
During the Third Republic, the name of the national anthem was changed to "L’Unité Nationale". This was the state anthem written by the party of Rally of the Togolese People that, between 1979 and 1992, replaced "Terre de nos aïeux". It was replaced by the old anthem in 1992, due to concerns that patriotism was equated with loyalty to the Rally.

French lyrics

Écartons tout mauvais esprit qui gêne l'unité nationale.
Combattons-le tout comme l'impérialisme.
Les règlements de compte, la haine et l'anarchie
Ne font que freiner la révolution.
Si nous sommes divisés, l'ennemi s'infiltre
Dans nos rangs pour nous exploiter.

Refrain:
A l'Union, l'Union, l'Union,
Oh, Togolais!
Nos ancêtres nous appellent.
La Paix, la Paix, la Paix,
Oh, Togolais!
Nos aïeux nous l'ordonnent.

N'oublions pas du tout l'appel historique du 30 août 69.
Écoutons-le retentir à jamais.
Notre voie de salut c'est le Rassemblement,
Rassemblement de tous les Togolais
Pour la grande victoire. Togolais debout!
Portons haut le flambeau de l'Union!

Refrain

Écartons le mauvais esprit qui gêne l'Unité africaine.
Écartons-le tout comme l'impérialisme.
Les coups de canons et les coups de fusils
Ne font que freiner l'élan de l'Afrique.
De notre désunion l'impérialisme profite,
Profite bien pour nous opposer.

Refrain

La Paix, la Paix, la Paix,
Oh, Dieu! La Paix,
La Paix pour l'Afrique!
La Paix, la Paix, la Paix,
Oh, Dieu! La Paix,
La Paix pour l'Afrique!

Ewe lyrics

English translation

Let us dismiss all the evil spirits that hinder national unity.
Let us fight it as the imperialism.
The settling of accounts, hatred and anarchy
Merely stop the revolution.
If we are divided, the enemy infiltrates
In our ranks to exploit us.

Chorus:
To the Union, Union, Union,
Oh, Togolese!
Our ancestors call us.
Peace, Peace, Peace,
Oh, Togolese!
Our forefathers instructed it us.

Let's not forget all of the historic appeal of 30 August 69.
Let's listen to the sound forever.
Our way of salvation is the Rally,
Rally of all the Togolese
For the great victory. Togo arise!
Carry the torch of the Union!

Chorus

Let us dismiss the evil spirit that hinders African Unity.
Let us dismiss it like imperialism.
The shots of cannons and rifle fires
Just slow the impetus of Africa.
From our disunity imperialism profits,
It benefits much to oppose us.

Chorus

Peace, Peace, Peace,
Oh, God! Peace,
Peace for Africa!
Peace, Peace, Peace,
Oh, God! Peace,
Peace for Africa
