= Vartkes Baronijan =

Yugoslav and Serbian composer and professor

- Варткес Баронијан
- Born: 23 April 1933; Belgrade, Kingdom of Yugoslavia
- Died: 21 March 1993 (aged 59); Belgrade, Serbia, FR Yugoslavia
- Education: University of Belgrade
- Occupation: Composer

Vartkes Baronijan (Serbian Cyrillic: Варткес Баронијан; 23 April 1933 – 21 March 1993) was a Yugoslav and Serbian composer, university professor and an editor at the Radio Television Belgrade.

== Biography ==
Baronijan was born on 23 April 1933 in Belgrade, Kingdom of Yugoslavia. He was of Armenian descent. He graduated from the Josip Slavenski Music School in Belgrade, and in 1963 from the composition department of the Faculty of Music at the University of Belgrade in the class of professor Predrag Milošević.

He wrote a large number of works such as Concerto for Orchestra, Divertimento for Flute, Clarinet, Strings and Percussion, String Quartet, Sonata, Variations, Suite for Piano, Sonata for Saxophone and Piano, a large number of solo songs. He was engaged in writing stage and film music. He is the composer of over 70 film and television productions, such as Vukovare, ljubavi moja (1993), Pamćenje zemlje (1991), Smrt gospođe ministarke (1991) (TV), Jastuk groba mog (1990) (TV), Klub 10 ( 1988) (TV), Na putu za Katangu (1987), Spa (1984) and more. He is the author of the famous book Muzika kao primenjena umetnost. A documentary film was made about him in 1995.
