= Gran Marcia Trionfale =

1857–1949 personal anthem of the Pope

Gran marcia trionfale
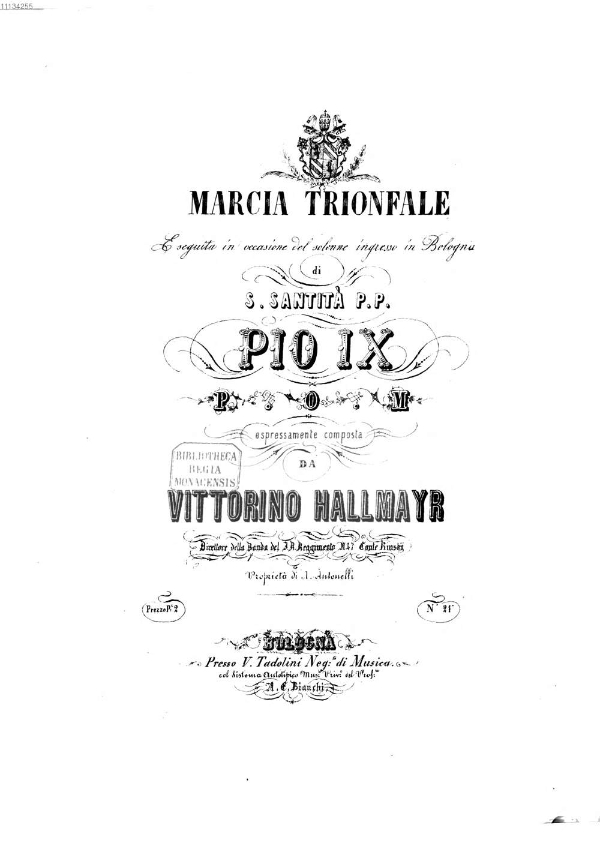
- Former national anthem of the Papal States and Vatican City
- Music: Vittorino Hallmayr, 1857
- Adopted: 1857 (Papal States); 1929 (Vatican City State)
- Relinquished: 1870 (Papal States); 1949 (Vatican City State)
- Succeeded by: "Pontifical Anthem and March"

Audio sample
- Marcia Trionfale (instrumental version): file; help

The Gran marcia trionfale (Italian for 'Grand Triumphal March') was the first personal anthem of the Pope and the first state anthem of the Vatican City State. It was written in 1857 by Viktorin Hallmayer, then director of the band of the Austrian 47th Infantry Regiment of the Line (the Count Kinsky Regiment) stationed within the Papal States.

The Marcia was played for the first time on the evening of 9 June 1857, to celebrate the entry of Pope Pius IX into Bologna. It proved immediately popular and was used repeatedly during that journey of the Pope to Florence and other central Italian cities, and on his return to Rome on 5 September 1857. This music was also played in the streets of Rome to celebrate the Lateran Treaty between the papacy and the Kingdom of Italy on 11 February 1929 and the end of the Roman Question.

Hallmayer's lively and waltz-like Marcia music was in the style of the period of its composition, but in the eve of the Holy Year 1950 Pope Pius XII decided to replace it with Charles Gounod's Marche Pontificale (composed in 1869), which had a more religious tone. It was performed officially for the last time on Christmas Eve, 1949.
