= Hessenlied =

Regional anthem of Hesse, Germany

English: Hessen song
- Regional anthem of Hesse, Germany
- Lyrics: Karl Preser
- Music: Albrecht Brede
- Adopted: 2000

The Hessenlied (Song of Hesse) is the official anthem of the German state of Hesse. The text was written by Carl Preser (1828-1910), the melody was composed by Albrecht Brede (1834-1920).

== Lyrics ==
Ich kenne ein Land, so reich und so schön,
voll goldener Ähren die Felder.
Dort grünen im Tal bis zu sonnigen Höh’n
viel dunkele, duftige Wälder.
Dort hab’ ich als Kind an der Mutter Hand
in Blüten und Blumen gesessen.
Ich grüß’ dich, du Heimat, du herrliches Land.
Herz Deutschlands, mein blühendes Hessenland.

Vom Main bis zur Weser, Werra und Lahn
ein Land voller blühender Auen,
dort glänzen die Städte, die wir alle sahn,
sind herrlich im Lichte zu schauen.
Dort hab ich als Kind an der Mutter Hand
in Blüten und Blumen gesessen.
Ich grüß dich, du Heimat, du herrliches Land.
Herz Deutschlands, mein blühendes Hessenland.

Translation:

I know a land so affluent and so beautiful,
the fields full of golden grain.
There flourish from the valley to sunny heights
many dark, fragrant forests.
Where I as a child in mother's hand
sat in blossoms and flowers.
I salute thee, thou homeland, thou magnificent land.
The heart of Germany, my thriving land Hesse.

From the Main to the Weser, Werra and Lahn
a land full of blooming meadows,
Where shine the cities that we all beheld,
are gorgeous to see in the light.
Where I as a child in mother's hand
sat in blossoms and flowers.
I salute thee, thou homeland, thou magnificent land.
The heart of Germany, my thriving land Hesse.
