= Württemberger Hymne =

Regional song of Württemberg, Germany

The Württemberger Hymne or Württemberg Anthem is a Regionalhymne or regional song, for the German state of Württemberg.

The music for the song was composed for the Kingdom of Württemberg (1806–1918) by Peter Joseph von Lindpaintner.

The lyrics begin, "Von dir, o Vaterland, zu singen / Muß wahrer Liebe wohl gelingen."

== Lyrics ==
Von Dir o Vaterland zu singen

muß wahrer Liebe wohl gelingen

da dich des Himmels Güte hält

mein Württemberg, du, das seit lange

gefeiert und mit gutem Klange

genannt bist in der weiten Welt

Du sendest aus der Kinder viele

an nahem wie an fernem Ziele

stellt sich der Württemberger ein

Er trägt, wo irgend Menschen wohnen

sein Heimatland nach allen Zonen

und draußen denkt ergiebig sein

Und deine holden Töchter leben

daheim in frommer Zucht und streben

das Heil und Glück im Hause sei

auch dessen Stütz´ und Schmuck zu werden

O sagt, welch anderes Land auf Erden

hat eine Burg die Weibertreu

Dein Volk liebt Freiheit, Lust und Frieden

doch ist das Kriegslos ihm beschieden

so übt es kühn des Kriegers Pflicht

und seine Denker, seine Weisen

hört man von 1000 Zungen preisen

und wer kennt Schwabens Sänger nicht?

Land, das man lieben muss und loben

noch bis zur stets beschirmt von oben

und dein Gedeihen ist Gottes Werk

Drum hebe dich du Wunderblume

empor zu immer neuem Ruhme

und allzeit: Hie gut Württemberg!

oder

So hebe dich du Wunderblume

empor zu immer neuem Ruhme

denn dein Gedeihen ist Gottes Werk

Land, das man lieben muss und loben

noch bis zur stets beschirmt von oben

drum allweg: Hie gut Württemberg!
