= Badnerlied =

Unofficial anthem of Baden, Germany

The Badnerlied ("Song of the People of Baden") is the unofficial hymn of the former state of Baden, now part of Baden-Württemberg.

== Origin ==
The song was adapted around 1865 from a similar hymn praising Saxony, which has since fallen into obscurity. Two reference points are the Festung in Rastatt and the industrialization of Mannheim. The verse beginning with "Alt-Heidelberg, Du feine" originates from the poem "The Trumpeter of Säckingen", a poem written around 1852 by Joseph Victor von Scheffel, who was also a resident of Baden. The earliest printed version of the Badnerlied appeared in 1906, in Marschlieder des 5. badischen Infanterieregiments Nr. 113 ("Marching songs of the 5th Infantry regiment of Baden").

== Importance ==
In the 1920s, there was talk of making the song the official hymn of Baden, but nothing came of it. The song's popularity was rekindled in the 1950s, in the wake of Baden having been absorbed into the state Baden-Württemberg, which still remains unpopular with some inhabitants; it has since remained the most popular regional hymn in south-west Germany.

The Badnerlied is played at home games of regional football, such as SC Freiburg, Karlsruher SC or 1899 Hoffenheim, but also in other contexts. The first four verses are the best known; the fifth (Der Bauer und der Edelmann...) is not as well known.

== Variations ==
The order of the verses also is subject to change, particularly swapping the second and fourth verses. Other small variations exist; in many places, steht is substituted for ist, for example In Rastatt ist die Festung becoming In Rastatt steht die Festung.

Many additional verses have been written. Particularly popular are those dealing with specific regions or cities, as well as those disparaging Swabia.

Rothaus, the state brewery of Baden, has its own modification, replacing In Rastatt ist die Festung with In Rothaus ist die Brauerei. This is particularly the case at association football games sponsored by the brewery. This is not the case with SC Freiburg; Karlsruher SC displays the text on the video screen, but the audio differs.

Charts created by the radio station SWR1 placed the Badnerlied at #9 for the whole state of Baden. Some regions scored higher; Konstanz (population 82,000) ranked it at #3; In Mosbach, it was even ranked as #1, leading an organization to name the residents of Mosbach as the 2006 Badeners of the year.

== Lyrics ==
Das schönste Land in Deutschlands Gau’n,
das ist mein Badnerland.
Es ist so herrlich anzuschau’n
und ruht in Gottes Hand.

Refrain:
D’rum grüß ich dich mein Badnerland,
du edle Perl’ im deutschen Land.
frisch auf, frisch auf; frisch auf, frisch auf;
frisch auf, frisch auf mein Badnerland.

In Karlsruh' ist die Residenz,
in Mannheim die Fabrik.
In Rastatt ist die Festung
und das ist Badens Glück.

Refrain

Alt-Heidelberg, du feine,
du Stadt an Ehren reich,
am Neckar und am Rheine,
kein’ and’re kommt dir gleich.

Refrain

In Haslach gräbt man Silbererz,
Bei Freiburg wächst der Wein,
im Schwarzwald schöne Mädchen,
ein Badner möcht’ ich sein.

Refrain

Der Bauer und der Edelmann,
das stolze Militär
die schau’n einander freundlich an,
und das ist Badens Ehr.

Refrain

Translation:

The most beautiful land in Germany
that is my land of Baden
it is so magnificent to look upon
and rests in the hand of God

Refrain:
And so, I greet you, my land of Baden
You noble pearl of Germany
Arise, arise; arise, arise!
Arise, arise my Badnerland!

The Palace is in Karlsruhe,
The factories, in Mannheim
In Rastatt, there is the stronghold
And that is Baden's fortune.

Refrain

Old Heidelberg, you noble city,
rich in honors
On the banks of the Neckar and the Rhine,
you are without equal.

Refrain

Silver ore is mined in Haslach,
In Freiburg, wine is grown,
In the Black Forest, maidens fair
I would like to be a Badner.

Refrain

The farmer and the nobleman,
the proud military
they look amicably at each other
and this is Baden’s honor.

Refrain

== Sources ==
- Waltraud Linder-Beroud: Ein neues Land – ein neues Lied? Badische Heimat 82 (2002), p. 96-109.
- Lutz Röhrich: „... und das ist Badens Glück“. Heimatlieder und Regionalhymnen im deutschen Südwesten. Auf der Suche nach Identität. Jahrbuch für Volksliedforschung, Jg. 35 (1990), p. 14-25.
