= Viktorin Hallmayer =

Austrian composer and conductor (1831–1872)

Viktorin Hallmayer (also Hallmayr; 5 September 1831 – 9 May 1872) was an Austrian composer and band conductor, best known as the author of the Marcia Trionfale, the first anthem of the Catholic Pontificate and of the Vatican City State.

Hallmayer was born in 1831 at Anthering. He composed the Marcia in 1857, when he was director of the band of the 47th Infantry Regiment of the Line (the Count Kinsky Regiment) stationed within the Papal States. He died in 1872 in Graz
