= Anthems of the Soviet Republics =

National anthems

The Soviet Union's various constituent republics each had their own anthem (generally referred as a "state anthem").

== History ==
The Russian Soviet Federative Socialist Republic was the last republic to adopt a state anthem, doing so in 1990. It had had none before this date, and used in its place the Soviet national anthem, which was "The Internationale" from 1917 to 1944 and the "National Anthem of the Soviet Union" from 1944 to 1990.

Unlike most national anthems, few of which were composed by renowned composers, the Soviet Union's various state anthems were composed by some of the best Soviet composers, including world-renowned Gustav Ernesaks (Estonia), Aram Khachaturian (Armenia), Otar Taktakishvili (Georgia), and Uzeyir Hajibeyov (Azerbaijan). After the fall of the union in 1991, one of the Soviet composers was asked to compose the current national anthem — Veli Mukhatov, who has previously composed the Turkmen SSR anthem, also composed the current State Anthem of Turkmenistan. In another case, a prior composition by the SSR Anthem's composer was re-adopted after independence: Azərbaycan marşı, which was composed by Uzeyir Hajibeyov in the 1920s, before he has been chosen to compose the Azerbaijani SSR anthem.

The lyrics present great similarities, all having mentions to Vladimir Lenin (and most, in their initial versions, to Joseph Stalin), to the guiding role of the Communist Party of the Soviet Union, and to the brotherhood of the Soviet peoples, including a specific reference to the friendship of the Russian people (the Estonian, Georgian and Karelo-Finnish anthems were apparently an exception to this last rule).

Some anthems' melody can be sung in the Soviet Union anthem lyrics (Ukrainian and Belarus are the most fitted in this case).

Most of these anthems were replaced during or after the dissolution of the USSR; Belarus, Kazakhstan (until 2006), Tajikistan, Turkmenistan (until 1996), and Uzbekistan kept the melodies, but with different lyrics. The Russian Federation itself had abandoned the Soviet hymn, replacing it with a tune by Glinka. However, with Vladimir Putin coming to power, the old Soviet tune was restored, with new lyrics written to it.

== Anthems ==
Republic	Title	Composers	Lyricists	Adopted	Relinquished
Armenian SSR	"Anthem of the Armenian SSR"	Aram Khachaturian	Sarmen	1944 1956 (mod.)	1991
Azerbaijan SSR	"Anthem of the Azerbaijan SSR"	Uzeyir Hajibeyov	Suleyman Rustam; Samad Vurgun; Huseyn Arif	1944 1978 (mod.)	1992
Byelorussian SSR	"Anthem of the Byelorussian SSR"	Nestar Sakalowski	Mihas' Klimovich	1952 1956 (mod.)	1991
Checheno-Ingush ASSR	"My Checheno-Ingushetia"	Aleksandr Khalebskii	Nurdin Muzayev	1966	1991 (Chechnya); 1992 (Ingushetia)
Estonian SSR	"Anthem of the Estonian SSR"	Gustav Ernesaks	Johannes Semper	1945; 1956 (mod.)	1990
(Georgian Soviet Socialist Republic) Georgian SSR	"Anthem of the Georgian SSR"	Otar Taktakishvili	Grigol Abashidze; Alexander Abasheli	1946 1956 (mod.)	1990
(Georgian Soviet Socialist Republic) Georgian SSR	"Dideba"	Kote Potskhverashvili	Kote Potskhverashvili	1990	2004
Kazakh SSR	"Anthem of the Kazakh SSR"	Mukan Tulebayev; Yevgeny Brusilovsky; Latif Khamidi	Abdilda Tazhibaev; Qajym Muxamedxanov; Gabit Musirepov	1945 1956 (mod.)	1991
Kirghiz SSR	"Anthem of the Kirghiz SSR"	Vladimir Vlasov; Abdylas Maldybaev; Vladimir Fere	Kubanychbek Malikov; Tugolbay Sydykbekov; Mukanbet Toktobaev; Aaly Tokombaev	1946 1956 (mod.)	1992
Latvian SSR	"Anthem of the Latvian SSR"	Anatols Liepiņš	Fricis Rokpelnis; Jūlijs Vanags	1945 1977 (mod.)	1990
(Lithuanian Soviet Socialist Republic) Lithuanian SSR	"Tautiška giesmė"	Vincas Kudirka		1944; 1988	1950 present
(Lithuanian Soviet Socialist Republic) Lithuanian SSR	"Anthem of the Lithuanian Soviet Socialist Republic"	Balys Dvarionas; Jonas Švedas	Antanas Venclova	1950; 1978 (mod.)	1988
Moldavian SSR	"Anthem of the Moldavian SSR"	Ștefan Neaga (1945); Eduard Lazarev (1980)	Emilian Bukov; Bogdan Istru	1945; 1980 (mod.)	1991
Russian SFSR	"The Patriotic Song"	Mikhail Glinka	None (instrumental)	1990	2000
Tajik SSR	"Anthem of the Tajik SSR"	Suleiman Yudakov	Abolqasem Lahouti	1946 1977 (mod.)	1994
Turkmen SSR	"Anthem of the Turkmen SSR"	Veli Mukhatov	Aman Kekilov/collective	1946; 1978 (lyrics)	1996
Tuvan ASSR	"Tooruktug Dolgay Tangdym"	Unknown	Ayana Samiyayevna Mongush	1944	2011
Ukrainian SSR	"Anthem of the Ukrainian SSR"	Anton Dmytrovych Lebedynets	Pavlo Tychyna (1949); Mykola Bazhan (1978)	1949; 1978 (mod.)	1992
Uzbek SSR	"Anthem of the Uzbek SSR"	Mutal Burkhanov	Timur Fattah; Turab Tula	1947 1978 (mod.)	1991

=== Others ===
The "Anthem of the Karelo-Finnish SSR" was used for the Karelo-Finnish SSR before it was demoted to an ASSR within the Russian SFSR. With the exception of the Checheno-Ingush ASSR and the Tuvan ASSR, autonomous republics of the Soviet Union (ASSRs) did not have their own official anthems, although unofficial versions had been used by some.

== Legal status ==
Like the hammer and sickle and red star, the public performance of the anthems of the Soviet republics and the anthem of the Soviet Union itself are considered by some as occupation symbols as well as symbols of totalitarianism and state terror by several countries formerly either members of or occupied by the Soviet Union. Accordingly, Latvia, Lithuania, Ukraine, and Estonia have banned those anthems amongst other things deemed to be symbols of fascism, socialism, communism, and the Soviet Union and its republics. In Poland, dissemination of items which are “media of fascist, communist, or other totalitarian symbolism” was criminalized in 1997. However, in 2011 the Constitutional Tribunal found this sanction to be unconstitutional. In contrast to this treatment of the symbolism, promotion of fascist, communist and other totalitarian ideology remains illegal. Those laws do not apply to the anthems of Russia, Belarus, Uzbekistan, Kazakhstan, and Tajikistan which have used the melody with different lyrics.
