= National symbols of Tajikistan =

Symbol	Name	Image
Official name	Republic of Tajikistan (and Tajikistan)	
National flag	Flag of Tajikistan	
National emblem	Coat of arms of Tajikistan	
National anthem	National anthem of Tajikistan	
National founder	Ismail Samani	
National animal	Marco Polo sheep (Ovis ammon polii)	
National bird	Golden eagle (Aquila chrysaetos)	
National flower	Red tulip (Tulipa gesneriana)	
National tree	Chinar (Platanus orientalis)	framless
National currency	Tajikistani somoni	
National dances	Pamiri dance, Women's dance Ostin, Ufar dance	
National instruments	Dutar, tanbur, rubab, tar, setar, ghijjak, doira, nay, karnay, surnay	
National poet	Abdullah Rudaki, Abdurahman Jami, Nasir Khusrav, Abulqasim Firdavsi, Umar Khayyam, Hafiz Sherazi, Jalaliddin Balkhi Mirzo Tursunzoda, Lāyiq Shēralī, Mirsaid Mirshakar, Gulnazar Keldi	
Patron saint	Zoroaster, Mir Sayyid Ali Hamadani	

The national symbols of Tajikistan are defined in Article 3 of the Constitution of Tajikistan. They consist of the flag, the coat of arms, and the national anthem.

The flag of Tajikistan

The emblem of Tajikistan

== The national anthem ==
Суруди Миллии Тоҷикистон
English: National Anthem of Tajikistan
- National anthem of Tajikistan
- Lyrics: Gulnazar Keldi
- Music: Suleiman Yudakov, 1946
- Adopted: 1991

Audio sample
- National Anthem of Tajikistan: file; help

"Surudi Milli" is the national anthem of Tajikistan, officially adopted in 1991. The lyrics were written by Gulnazar Keldi and the music by Suleiman Yudakov, the same melody from the Anthem of the Tajik Soviet Socialist Republic. Note the Cyrillic script is the only official script of the country and the Perso-Arabic script is not well known in the country itself and is just provided as a comparison to the Tajik language since it is a dialect of Persian.

Lyrics:

Tajik Cyrillic script (official)

Диёри арҷманди мо,
Ба бахти мо сари азизи ту баланд бод,
Саодати ту, давлати ту бегазанд бод.
Зи дурии замонаҳо расидаем,
Ба зери парчами ту саф кашидаем, кашидаем.

Зинда бош, эй Ватан,
Тоҷикистони озоди ман!

Барои ному нанги мо
Ту аз умеди рафтагони мо нишонаӣ,
Ту баҳри ворисон ҷахони ҷовидонаӣ,
Хазон намерасад ба навбаҳори ту,
Ки мазраи вафо бувад канори ту, канори ту.

Зинда бош, эй Ватан,
Тоҷикистони озоди ман!

Ту модари ягонаӣ,
Бақои ту бувад бақои хонадони мо,
Мароми ту бувад мароми ҷисму ҷони мо,
Зи ту саодати абад насиби мост,
Ту ҳастиву ҳама ҷаҳон ҳабиби мост, ҳабиби мост.

Зинда бош, эй Ватан,
Тоҷикистони озоди ман!

Transliteration

Diyori arjmandi mo
Ba baĉti mo sari azizi tu baland bod,
Saodati tu, davlati tu begazand bod.
Zi duriyi zamonaho rasidayem,
Ba zeri parčami tu saf kašidayem, kašidayem.

Zinda boš, ey Vatan,
Tojikistoni ozodi man!

Baroyi nomu nangi mo
Tu az umedi raftagoni mo nišonayī,
Tu bahri vorison jahoni jovidonayī,
Ĉazon namerasad ba navbahori tu,
Ki mazrayi vafo buvad kanori tu, kanori tu.

Zinda boš, ey Vatan,
Tojikistoni ozodi man!

Tu modari yagonayī,
Baqoyi tu buvad baqoyi ĉonadoni mo,
Maromi tu buvad maromi jismu joni mo,
Zi tu saodati abad nasibi most,
Tu hastivu hama jahon habibi most, habibi most.

Zinda boš, ey Vatan,
Tojikistoni ozodi man!

Rough English translation

Our beloved country,
We are happy to see your pride.
Let your happiness and prosperity be forever.
We have reached this day since ancient times,
We stand under your flag, under your flag.

Long live my homeland, my free Tajikistan!

You are a symbol of our ancestors' hope
Our honour and dignity,
You are an eternal world for your sons,
Your spring will never end,
We remain loyal to you, loyal to you.

Long live my homeland, my free Tajikistan!

You are a mother for all of us,
Your future is our future,
Your meaning is the meaning of our souls and bodies,
You give us happiness forever,
Because of you, we love the world, love the world.

Long live my homeland, my free Tajikistan!
