= Muhadow =

Muhadow or Muhadov or Mukhatov (f. Muhadowa or Muhadova, Russian: Мухадов) is a Russianized Turkmen family name.

Muhadow may refer to:

- Weli Muhadow (1916–2005), Soviet and Turkmen composer
- Çariýar Muhadow (b. 1969), Turkmen football player
- Azat Muhadow (b. 1981), Turkmen football player
- Süleýman Muhadow (b. 1993), Turkmen football player
