= Anthem of the Uzbek Soviet Socialist Republic =

O‘zbekiston SSR davlat madhiyasi
English: State Anthem of the USSR
- Ўзбекистон ССР давлат мадҳияси Гимн Узбекской ССР
- Former regional anthem of the Uzbek Soviet Socialist Republic
- Lyrics: Timur Fattah and Turab Tula
- Music: Mutal Burhonov, 1947
- Adopted: 1947
- Relinquished: 1991
- Succeeded by: State Anthem of Uzbekistan

Audio sample
- 1968 official band instrumental recording by the Brass Band of the USSR Ministry of Defence: file; help

The State Anthem of the Uzbek Soviet Socialist Republic (Note: Uzbek: Ўзбекистон Совет Социалист Республикасининг давлат мадҳияси, romanized: O‘zbekiston Sovet Socialist Respublikasining davlat madhiyasi; Russian: Гимн Узбекской Советской Социалистической Республики, romanized: Gimn Uzbekskoj Sovetskoj Socialističeskoj Respubliki) was adopted and approved in 1947 as an official state symbol by the Supreme Soviet of the Uzbek Soviet Socialist Republic. The authors of the lyrics were the poets Turab Tula and Timur Fattah. The music of the anthem is credited to Mutal Burhonov, whose music is retained in the current national anthem of Uzbekistan.

== Background ==
The anthem was used 1947 to 1991. The music was composed by Mutal Burkhanov, and the words were written by Timur Fattah and Turab Tula. The anthem, such as those of the Tajik SSR and the Turkmen SSR, opens with a salute to the Russian people. The Uzbeks are not mentioned until the fourth line.

The melody is used in the current national anthem of Uzbekistan, with different lyrics. It is one of the four remaining post-Soviet countries, along with Russia, Belarus, and Tajikistan, to continuously use their Soviet-era anthems with different lyrics. The Soviet-era lyrics were removed after the Uzbek SSR changed its name to the Republic of Uzbekistan and declared independence on 31 August 1991, when Abdulla Oripov wrote new lyrics adopted in 1992.

== Lyrics ==
=== Post-Stalinist lyrics ===
==== Uzbek version ====
Official orchestral and choral vocal version

Cyrillic script

Ассалом, Рус халқи, буюк оғамиз,
Барҳаёт доҳиймиз Ленин, жонажон, жонажон!
Озодлик йўлини Сиз кўрсатдингиз,
Советлар юртида Ўзбек топди шон!

Нақарот:
Партия раҳнамо, жон Ўзбекистон,
Серқуёш ўлкасан, обод, баркамол!
Тупроғинг хазина, бахтинг бир жаҳон,
Советлар юртида сенга ёр иқбол!

Серқуёш ўлкада кўрмасдик зиё,
Дарёлар бўйида эдик сувга зор, сувга зор.
Тонг отди, Инқилоб, Ленин раҳнамо,
Раҳнамо Лениндан халқлар миннатдор!

Нақарот

Коммунизм гулбоғи мангу навбаҳор,
Тоабад қардошлик – дўстлик барҳаёт, барҳаёт!
Советлар байроғи ғолиб, барқарор,
Бу байроқ нуридан порлар коинот!

Нақарот

Latin script

Assalom, Rus xalqi, buyuk ogʻamiz,
Barhayot dohiymiz Lenin, jonajon, jonajon!
Ozodlik yoʻlini Siz koʻrsatdingiz,
Sovetlar yurtida Oʻzbek topdi shon!

Naqarot:
Partiya rahnamo, jon Oʻzbekiston,
Serquyosh oʻlkasan, obod, barkamol!
Tuprogʻing xazina, baxting bir jahon,
Sovetlar yurtida senga yor iqbol!

Serquyosh oʻlkada koʻrmasdik ziyo,
Daryolar boʻyida edik suvga zor, suvga zor.
Tong otdi, Inqilob, Lenin rahnamo,
Rahnamo Lenindan xalqlar minnatdor!

Naqarot

Kommunizm gulbogʻi mangu navbahor,
Toabad qardoshlik – doʻstlik barhayot, barhayot!
Sovetlar bayrogʻi gʻolib, barqaror,
Bu bayroq nuridan porlar koinot!

Naqarot

IPA transcription (Note: See Help:IPA/Uzbek and Uzbek phonology.)

[ʔɐs.sɐˈlɔm | rus χɐlˈqɪ | bʊˈjʊk | ʔɔ.ʁɐˈmɪz |]
[bɐr.ɦɐˈjɔt dɔ.ɦɪˈmɪz ˈle.nɪn | 𝄆 dʒɔ.nɐˈdʒɔn 𝄇 ‖]
[ʔɔ.zɔdˈlɪk jɵ.lɪˈnɪ sɪz | kɵr.sɐtˈdɪŋ.gɪz |]
[sɔ.ʋetˈlar jʊr.tɪˈda | ʔɵzˈbek | tɔpˈdɪ ʃɔn ‖]

[nɐ.qɐˈrɔt]
[ˈpar.tɪ.jɐ rɐɦ.nɐˈmɔ | dʒɔn ʔɵzˌbe.kɪsˈtɔn |]
[ser.qʊˈjɔʃ | ʔɵl.kɐˈsan ʔɔˈbɔt bɐr.kɐˈmɔl ‖]
[tʊp.rɔˈʁɪŋ χɐ.zɪˈna bɐχˈtɪŋ bɪr dʒɐˈɦɔn |]
[sɔ.ʋetˈlar jʊr.tɪˈda | seŋˈga jɔr | ʔɪqˈbɔl ‖]

[ser.qʊˈjɔʃ | ʔɵl.kɐˈda | kɵrˈmas | dɪk zɪˈjɔ |]
[dɐr.jɔˈlar bɵ.jɪˈda ʔeˈdɪk 𝄆 sʊʋˈga zɔr 𝄇 ‖]
[tɔŋ ʔɔtˈdɪ ʔɪn.qɪˈlɔp ˈle.nɪn rɐɦ.nɐˈmɔ |]
[rɐɦ.nɐˈmɔ le.nɪnˈdan χɐlqˈlar mɪn.nɐtˈdɔr ‖]

[nɐ.qɐˈrɔt]

[kɔm.mʊˈnɪzm | gʊl.bɔˈʁɪ | mɐŋˈgʊ | nɐʋ.bɐˈɦɔr |]
[tɔ.ʔɐˈbat qɐr.dɔʃˈlɪk dɵstˈlɪk | 𝄆 bɐr.ɦɐˈjɔt 𝄇 ‖]
[sɔ.ʋetˈlar bɐj.rɔˈʁɪ ʁɔˈlɪp bɐr.qɐˈrɔr |]
[bu bɐjˈrɔq nʊ.rɪˈdan | pɔrˈlar | kɔ.ʔɪˈnɔt ‖]

[nɐ.qɐˈrɔt]

==== English translation ====
Peace be upon you, Russians, our great comrades,
Long live our dear leader Lenin, our beloved – our beloved!
You have shown us the path to freedom,
In the land of Soviets, Uzbeks found glory!

Chorus:
The Party is our guide, dear Uzbekistan,
A sunny land you are, rich and harmonious!
Your soil is a treasure, your joy is endless,
May you be blessed in the land of the Soviets!

In the sunny land we could not see the light,
By river banks we were thirsty for water, for water.
Yet forth Lenin came and morning rose upon us;
He who shall remain eternally in our hearts.

Chorus

The garden of communism shall forever blossom,
Eternal brotherhood – friendship shall live on, shall live on!
The Soviet banner is victorious and firm,
The universe shines from the light of this flag!

Chorus

=== Original lyrics ===
==== Uzbek version ====
Cyrillic script

Ассалом, рус халқи, буюк оғамиз,
Ассалом, доҳимиз Сталин, жонажон, жонажон!
Озодлик йўлини Сиз кўрсатдингиз,
Советлар элида ўзбек топди шон.

Нақарот 1:
Бўл омон, пахтакор ҳур Ўзбекистон,
Сен Шарқда нурафшон юртим, топ камол,
Советлар байроғи, зафар байроғи —
Доимо бахш этар сенга шон-иқбол.

Серқуёш ўлкада кўрмасдик зиё,
Дарёлар бўйида эдик сувга зор, сувга зор.
Барқ урди чин қуёш — Ленин доҳимиз,
Йўллади Сталин — биз бўлдик бахтиёр.

Нақарот 2:
Бўл омон, пахтакор ҳур Ўзбекистон,
Бадавлат, фаровон юртим, топ камол.
Советлар байроғи, зафар байроғи —
Доимо бахш этар сенга шон-иқбол.

Илму фан нури-ла йўлимиз равшан,
Абадий қардошдир Совет халқлари, халқлари.
Босқинчи ёвларни этиб тору-мор,
Борамиз биз янги зафарлар сари.

Нақарот 3:
Бўл омон, пахтакор ҳур Ўзбекистон,
Енгилмас, қаҳрамон юртим, топ камол.
Советлар байроғи, зафар байроғи —
Доимо бахш этар сенга шон-иқбол.

Latin script

Assalom, Rus xalqi, buyuk ogʻamiz,
Assalom, dohimiz Stalin, jonajon, jonajon!
Ozodlik yoʻlini Siz koʻrsatdingiz,
Sovetlar elida oʻzbek topdi shon.

Naqarot 1:
Boʻl omon, paxtakor hur Oʻzbekiston,
Sen Sharqda nurafshon yurtim, top kamol.
Sovetlar bayrogʻi, zafar bayrogʻi —
Doimo baxsh etar senga shon-iqbol.

Serquyosh oʻlkada koʻrmasdik ziyo,
Daryolar boʻyida edik suvga zor, suvga zor.
Barq urdi chin quyosh — Lenin dohimiz,
Yoʻlladi Stalin — biz boʻldik baxtiyor.

Naqarot 2:
Boʻl omon, paxtakor hur Oʻzbekiston,
Badavlat, farovon yurtim, top kamol.
Sovetlar bayrogʻi, zafar bayrogʻi —
Doimo baxsh etar senga shon-iqbol.

Ilmu fan nuri-la yoʻlimiz ravshan,
Abadiy qardoshdir Sovet xalqlari, xalqlari.
Bosqinchi yovlarni etib toru mor,
Boramiz biz yangi zafarlar sari!

Naqarot 3:
Boʻl omon, paxtakor hur Oʻzbekiston,
Yengilmas, qahramon yurtim, top kamol.
Sovetlar bayrogʻi, zafar bayrogʻi —
Doimo baxsh etar senga shon-iqbol.

IPA transcription

[ʔɐs.sɐˈlɔm | rus χɐlˈqɪ | bʊˈjʊk | ʔɔ.ʁɐˈmɪz |]
[ʔɐs.sɐˈlɔm dɔ.ɦɪˈmɪz ˈsta.lɪn | 𝄆 dʒɔ.nɐˈdʒɔn 𝄇 ‖]
[ʔɔ.zɔdˈlɪk jɵ.lɪˈnɪ sɪz | kɵr.sɐtˈdɪŋ.gɪz |]
[sɔ.ʋetˈlar jʊr.tɪˈda | ʔɵzˈbek | tɔpˈdɪ ʃɔn ‖]

[nɐ.qɐˈrɔt bɪr]
[bɵl ʔɔˈmɔn pɐχ.tɐˈkɔr | ɦʊr ʔɵzˌbe.kɪsˈtɔn |]
[sen ʃɐrkˈda nʊ.rɐfˈʃɔn jʊrˈtɪm | tɔp kɐˈmɔl ‖]
[sɔ.ʋetˈlar bɐj.rɔˈʁɪ | zɐˈfar bɐj.rɔˈʁɪ |]
[dɔ.ʔɪˈmɔ baχʃ ʔeˈtar seŋˈga ʃɔn | ʔɪqˈbɔl ‖]

[ser.qʊˈjɔʃ | ʔɵl.kɐˈda | kɵrˈmas | dɪk zɪˈjɔ |]
[dɐr.jɔˈlar bɵ.jɪˈda ʔeˈdɪk 𝄆 sʊʋˈga zɔr 𝄇 ‖]
[barq ʔʊrˈdɪ tʃɪn qʊˈjɔʃ | ˈle.nɪn dɔ.ɦɪˈmɪz |]
[jɵl.lɐˈdɪ ˈsta.lɪn | bɪz bɵlˈdɪk bɐχ.tɪˈjɔr ‖]

[nɐ.qɐˈrɔt ʔɪkˈkɪ]
[bɵl ʔɔˈmɔn pɐχ.tɐˈkɔr | ɦʊr ʔɵzˌbe.kɪsˈtɔn |]
[bɐ.dɐʋˈlat | fɐ.rɔˈʋɔn jʊrˈtɪm | tɔp kɐˈmɔl ‖]
[sɔ.ʋetˈlar bɐj.rɔˈʁɪ | zɐˈfar bɐj.rɔˈʁɪ |]
[dɔ.ʔɪˈmɔ baχʃ ʔeˈtar seŋˈga ʃɔn | ʔɪqˈbɔl ‖]

[ʔɪlˈmʊ fan | nʊˈrɪ.lɐ | jɵ.lɪˈmɪz | rɐʋˈʃan |]
[ʔɐ.bɐˈdi qɐrˈdɔʃ.dɪr sɔˈʋet 𝄆 χɐlq.lɐˈrɪ 𝄇 ‖]
[bɔs.qɪnˈtʃɪ jɔʋ.lɐrˈnɪ | ʔeˈtɪp tɔˈrʊ mɔr |]
[bɔˈra.mɪz bɪz jɐŋˈgɪ zɐ.fɐrˈlar saˈrɪ ‖]

[nɐ.qɐˈrɔt ʔʊtʃ]
[bɵl ʔɔˈmɔn pɐχ.tɐˈkɔr | ɦʊr ʔɵzˌbe.kɪsˈtɔn |]
[jeŋ.ɡɪlˈmas | kɐɦ.rɐˈmɔn jʊrˈtɪm | tɔp kɐˈmɔl ‖]
[sɔ.ʋetˈlar bɐj.rɔˈʁɪ | zɐˈfar bɐj.rɔˈʁɪ |]
[dɔ.ʔɪˈmɔ baχʃ ʔeˈtar seŋˈga ʃɔn | ʔɪqˈbɔl ‖]

==== English translation ====
Peace be upon you, Russians, our great brothers,
Peace be upon our immortal leader, dear Stalin!
You have shown us the path of freedom,
In the Soviet land, the Uzbeks are glorified!

Chorus 1:
Long live the land of cotton, free Uzbekistan,
Bright hearth of the east, reach perfection.
Banner of Soviets, banner of victory,
May you forever be glorious.

On hot days the sun was hidden from us,
We were thirsty even by filled rivers.
Yet the faithful sun of Lenin shone upon us,
And Stalin showed us the way to our happiness!

Chorus 2:
Long live the land of cotton, free Uzbekistan,
My rich, prosperous country, reach perfection.
Banner of Soviets, banner of victory,
May you forever be glorious.

With the light of science, our path is now clear,
The Soviets are our eternal brothers.
Annihilating intruding enemies,
Let us advance to new victories!

Chorus 3:
Long live the land of cotton, free Uzbekistan,
My invincible, heroic country, reach perfection.
Banner of Soviets, banner of victory,
May you forever be glorious.
