= State Anthem of Turkmenistan =

Türkmenistanyň Döwlet senasy
English: State Anthem of Turkmenistan
- National anthem of Turkmenistan
- Also known as: Türkmenistanyň Döwlet gimni (1996-2008)
- Lyrics: Saparmyrat Nyýazow, 1996; Modified in 2008 (current version)
- Music: Weli Muhadow
- Adopted: 27 September 1996 (original version)
- Readopted: 2008 (current version)
- Preceded by: Anthem of the Turkmen Soviet Socialist Republic

Audio sample
- U.S. Navy Band instrumental rendition in F major: file; help

Original choral recording

The State Anthem of Turkmenistan was adopted as the national anthem of Turkmenistan in 1996, replacing the Anthem of the Turkmen Soviet Socialist Republic. After the death of Saparmyrat Nyýazow in 2006, the lyrics were modified in 2008 by removing his title of "Türkmenbaşy" in the refrain. (Note: The title is sometimes also ambiguously translated as "Independent, Neutral Turkmenistan State Anthem", a literal translation from the title in Turkmen. Since the Cyrillic script is still widely used for Turkmen, it is rendered in Cyrillic as: Гарашсыз, Битарап Түркменистаның Дөвлет Гимни. The title in the Arabic script is written as: قاراشسؽز، بيتاراپ تۆرکمنيستانؽنگ دولت گيمنى. The title is pronounced [ˌɢɑɾɑʃˈθɯð | ˌbiːtɑˈɾɑp tʏɾkˌmønʏθːɑˈnɯŋ dœβˈlet gɪmˈnɪ]) The music was composed by Weli Muhadow, who also composed the music for the Soviet-era anthem.

The lyrics were originally written by the first president of Turkmenistan, Saparmyrat Nyýazow, also known as Türkmenbaşy, who died on 21 December 2006. Less than two years after his death, references to him in the chorus were replaced with "the people", and both the third and final verse and the chorus at the start of the piece were removed. The national anthem is played at the start of radio and television broadcasts at 6:55 a.m. local time and played again when radio and television stations sign off.

== History ==
Until 1996, Turkmenistan, which received independence a few years earlier, used the Turkmen SSR anthem without words as the state anthem. The new anthem was adopted on 27 September 1996 by the People's Council of Turkmenistan in Bayramali. The anthem, known by the first sentence of the chorus, "The great creation of Türkmenbaşy", in reference to the country's first leader Saparmyrat Nyýazow, was used from 1997 to 2008, when it was given minor changes when his successor, Gurbanguly Berdimuhamedow, ordered to do so following Nyýazow's death in 2006.

== Lyrics ==
=== Current official ===
Turkmen original	IPA transcription as sung (Note: See Help:IPA/Turkmen and Turkmen grammar § Phonology.)
I Janym gurban saňa, erkana ýurdum Mert pederleň ruhy bardyr köňülde. Bitarap, Garaşsyz topragyň nurdur Baýdagyň belentdir dünýäň öňünde. Gaýtalama: Halkyň guran baky beýik binasy Berkarar döwletim, jigerim–janym. Başlaryň täji sen, diller senasy Dünýä dursun, sen dur, Türkmenistanym! II; Gardaşdyr tireler, amandyr iller Owal–ahyr birdir biziň ganymyz. Harasatlar almaz, syndyrmaz siller Nesiller döş gerip gorar şanymyz. Gaýtalama	I [d͡ʒɑː.ˈnɯm ɢʊɾ.ˈbɑːn θɑŋ.ˈɑ | ˌeɾ.qɑː.ˈnɑ jʊɾ.ˈdʊm |] [meɾt ˌpe.deɾ.ˈleŋ ɾuː.ˈχɯ | ˈbɑːɾ.dɯɾ ˌkœŋ.ʏl.ˈlø ‖] [ˌbiː.tɑ.ˈɾɑp ˌɢɑ.ɾɑʃ.ˈθɯð | ˌtop.ɾɑ.ˈʁɯŋ nuːɾ.ˈdʊɾ |] [ˌbɑj.dɑ.ˈʁɯŋ be.ˈlenː.dɪɾ | dʏn.ˈjæːŋ ˌœŋ.ʏn.ˈnø ‖] [ˌɢɑj.tɑ.ɫɑ.ˈmɑ] [χɑɫ.ˈqɯŋ ɢʊ.ˈɾɑn bɑː.ˈqɯ | be.ˈjɪk ˌbɪ.nɑː.ˈθɯ |] [ˌbeɾ.qɑ.ˈɾɑːɾ ˌdœβ.le.ˈtɪm | ˌd͡ʒɪ.ɣe.ˈɾɪm d͡ʒɑː.ˈnɯm ‖] [ˌbɑʃ.ɫɑ.ˈɾɯŋ tæː.ˈd͡ʒɪ θen | dɪl.ˈleɾ ˌθe.nɑː.ˈθɯ |] [dʏn.ˈjæː dʊɾ.ˈθʊn θen dʊɾ | tʏɾk.ˌmø.nʏθ.θɑː.ˈnɯm ‖] II [ɢɑɾ.ˈdɑʒ.dɯɾ ˌtiː.ɾe.ˈleɾ | ɑ.ˈmɑːn.nɯɾ iːl.ˈleɾ |] [o.ˌβɑ.ɫ‿ɑː.ˈχɯːɾ ˈbɪɾ.dɪɾ | bɪ.ˈðɪŋ ˌɢɑː.nɯ.ˈmɯð ‖] [ˌχɑ.ɾɑ.θɑːt.ˈɫɑɾ ɑɫ.ˈmɑð | ˌθɯːn.nɯɾ.ˈmɑð θiːl.ˈleɾ |] [ˌne.θɪl.ˈleɾ dœːʃ ge.ˈɾɪp | ɢoː.ˈɾɑɾ ˌʃɑ.nɯ.ˈmɯð ǁ] [ˌɢɑj.tɑ.ɫɑ.ˈmɑ]
Perso-Arabic script	Cyrillic script
١ جانؽم قربان ساݣا، ارقانا يوُردوُم مرت پدرلڭ روُخؽ باردؽر کؤڭۆلده. بيتاراپ، قاراشسؽز توْپراغؽڭ نوُردوُر بايداغؽڭ بلنتدير دنیأڭ اؤڭۆنده. قايتالاما: خلقؽڭ قرآن باقؽ بييك بيناسؽ برقارار دولتيم، جگريم–جانؽم. باشلارؽڭ تأجى سن، ديللر سناسؽ دنیا دوُرسوُن، سن دوُر، تۆرکمنيستانؽم! ٢ قارداشدؽر تيرلر، آماندؽر ايللر اول–آخر بيردير بيزيڭ قانؽمؽز. خاراساتلاز آلماز، سؽندؽرماز سيللر نسللر دؤش گريپ قوْرار شانؽمؽز. قايتالاما	I Җаным гурбан саңа, эркана юрдум Мерт педерлең рухы бардыр көңүлде. Битарап, Гарашсыз топрагың нурдур Байдагың белентдир дүнйәң өңүнде. Гайталама: Халкың гуран бакы бейик бинасы Беркарар дөвлетим, җигерим – җаным. Башларың тәҗи сен, диллер сенасы Дүнйә дурсун, сен дур, Түркменистаным! II; Гардашдыр тирелер, амандыр иллер Овал-ахыр бирдир бизиң ганымыз. Харасатлар алмаз, сындырмаз силлер Несиллер дөш герип горар шанымыз. Гайталама

English translation

I
My soul is a sacrifice to you, my beloved country,
The spirit of a brave father is in my heart.
The light of a neutral and independent land
Your flag is raised high before the world.

Chorus:
The great eternal creation of the people,
My sovereign state, my heart and soul.
You are the crown of heads, the praise of tongues.
Let the world stand still, let you be still, Turkmenistan!

II
The tribes are brothers; the nations live in peace.
(Referring to tribes that were once rivals, but are now at peace.)
For after all, our blood is one.
No storms nor floods can ever break us,
Generation after generation will rise to defend our honour.

Chorus

=== Original version ===
U.S. Navy Band instrumental version (1997–2008 anthem)

Modern digital instrumental and choral rendition in F-sharp major

Turkmen original	IPA transcription as sung
Gaýtalama: Türkmenbaşyň guran beýik binasy Berkarar döwletim, jigerim–janym. Başlaryň täji sen, diller senasy Dünýä dursun, sen dur, Türkmenistanym! I Janym gurban saňa, erkana ýurdum Mert pederleň ruhy bardyr köňülde. Bitarap, Garaşsyz topragyň nurdur Baýdagyň belentdir dünýän öňünde. Gaýtalama II; Gardaşdyr tireler, amandyr iller Owal–ahyr birdir biziň ganymyz. Harasatlar almaz, syndyrmaz siller Nesiller döş gerip gorar şanymyz. Gaýtalama III; Arkamdyr bu daglar, penamdyr düzler Ykbalym, namysym, togabym, Watan! Saňa şek ýetirse, kör bolsun gözler Geçmişim, geljegim, dowamym, Watan!	[ˌɢɑj.tɑ.ɫɑ.ˈmɑ] [tʏɾk.ˌmøn.bɑ.ˈʃɯŋ ɢʊ.ˈɾɑn | be.ˈjɪk ˌbɪ.nɑː.ˈθɯ |] [ˌbeɾ.qɑ.ˈɾɑːɾ ˌdœβ.le.ˈtɪm | ˌd͡ʒɪ.ɣe.ˈɾɪm d͡ʒɑː.ˈnɯm ‖] [ˌbɑʃ.ɫɑ.ˈɾɯŋ tæː.ˈd͡ʒɪ θen | dɪl.ˈleɾ ˌθe.nɑː.ˈθɯ |] [dʏn.ˈjæː dʊɾ.ˈθʊn θen dʊɾ | tʏɾk.ˌmø.nʏθ.θɑː.ˈnɯm ‖] I [d͡ʒɑː.ˈnɯm ɢʊɾ.ˈbɑːn θɑŋ.ˈɑ | ˌeɾ.qɑː.ˈnɑ jʊɾ.ˈdʊm |] [meɾt ˌpe.deɾ.ˈleŋ ɾuː.ˈχɯ | ˈbɑːɾ.dɯɾ ˌkœŋ.ʏl.ˈlø ‖] [ˌbiː.tɑ.ˈɾɑp ˌɢɑ.ɾɑʃ.ˈθɯð | ˌtop.ɾɑ.ˈʁɯŋ nuːɾ.ˈdʊɾ |] [ˌbɑj.dɑ.ˈʁɯŋ be.ˈlenː.dɪɾ | dʏn.ˈjæːŋ ˌœŋ.ʏn.ˈnø ‖] [ˌɢɑj.tɑ.ɫɑ.ˈmɑ] II [ɢɑɾ.ˈdɑʒ.dɯɾ ˌtiː.ɾe.ˈleɾ | ɑ.ˈmɑːn.nɯɾ iːl.ˈleɾ |] [o.ˌβɑ.ɫ‿ɑː.ˈχɯːɾ ˈbɪɾ.dɪɾ | bɪ.ˈðɪŋ ˌɢɑː.nɯ.ˈmɯð ‖] [ˌχɑ.ɾɑ.θɑːt.ˈɫɑɾ ɑɫ.ˈmɑð | ˌθɯːn.nɯɾ.ˈmɑð θiːl.ˈleɾ |] [ˌne.θɪl.ˈleɾ dœːʃ ge.ˈɾɪp | ɢoː.ˈɾɑɾ ˌʃɑ.nɯ.ˈmɯð ǁ] [ˌɢɑj.tɑ.ɫɑ.ˈmɑ] III [ɑɾ.ˈqɑm.dɯɾ buː dɑːʁ.ˈɫɑɾ | pe.ˈnɑːm.dɯɾ dʏð.ˈløɾ |] [ɯɢ.bɑː.ˈɫɯm nɑː.mɯ.ˈθɯm | to.ʁɑ.ˈbɯm βɑ.ˈtɑn ‖] [θɑŋ.ˈɑ ʃek ˌje.tɪɾ.ˈθe | kœːɾ boɫ.ˈθʊn gœð.ˈløɾ |] [ˌget͡ʃ.mɪ.ˈʃɪm ˌgel.d͡ʒe.ˈɣɪm | ˌdo.βɑː.ˈmɯm βɑ.ˈtɑn ‖]
Perso-Arabic script	Cyrillic script
قايتالاما: تۆرکمنباشینگ قرآن بييك بيناسؽ برقارار دولتيم، جگريم–جانؽم. باشلارؽنگ تأجى سن، ديللر سناسؽ دنیا دوُرسوُن، سن دوُر، تۆرکمنيستانؽم! ١ جانؽم قربان سانگا، ارقانا يوُردوُم مرت پدرلنگ روُخؽ باردؽر کؤنگۆلده. بيتاراپ، قاراشسؽز توْپراغؽنگ نوُردوُر بايداغؽنگ بلنتدير دنیأنگ اؤنگۆنده. قايتالاما ٢ قارداشدؽر تيرلر، آماندؽر ايللر اول–آخر بيردير بيزينگ قانؽمؽز. خاراساتلاز آلماز، سؽندؽرماز سيللر نسللر دؤش گريپ قوْرار شانؽمؽز. قايتالاما ٣ آرقامدؽر بوُ داغلار، پنامدؽر دۆزلر إقبالؽم، نامؽسؽم، تغابؽم، وطن! سانکا شك يتيرسه، کور بوْلسوُن گؤزلر گچميشيم، گلجگيم، دوْوامؽم، وطن!	Гайталама: Түркменбашың гуран бейик бинасы Беркарар дөвлетим, җигерим–җаным. Башларың тәҗи сен, диллер сенасы Дүнйә дурсун, сен дур, Түркменистаным! I Җаным гурбан саңа, эркана юрдум Мерт педерлең рухы бардыр көңүлде. Битарап, Гарашсыз топрагың нурдур Байдагың белентдир дүнйәң өңүнде. Гайталама II; Гардашдыр тирелер, амандыр иллер Овал–ахыр бирдир бизиң ганымыз. Харасатлар алмаз, сындырмаз силлер Несиллер дөш герип горар шанымыз. Гайталама III; Аркамдыр бу даглар, пенамдыр дүзлер Ыкбалым, намысым, тогабым, Ватан! Саңа шек етирсе, көр болсун гөзлер Гечмишим, гелҗегим, довамым, Ватан!

English translation

Chorus:
The great eternal creation of Türkmenbaşy
My sovereign state, my heart and soul.
You are the crown of heads, the praise of tongues.
Let the world stop, let you stand still, Turkmenistan!

I
My soul is a sacrifice to you, my beloved country,
The spirit of a brave father is in my heart.
The light of a neutral and independent land
Your flag is raised high before the world

Chorus

II
The tribes are brothers; the nations live in peace.
(Referring to tribes that were once rivals, but are now at peace.)
For after all, our blood is one.
No storms nor floods can ever break us,
Generation after generation will rise to defend our honour.

Chorus

III
These mountains are my back, these plains are my refuge.
My destiny, my honor, my homeland!
If he doubts you, may his eyes be blinded.
My past, my present, my future, my homeland!
