= Iskodar =

Iskodar Искодар
- Location in Tajikistan
- Coordinates: 39°27′10″N 68°29′14″E
- Country: Tajikistan
- Region: Sughd Region
- District: Ayni District

Population (2017)
  - Total: 1,322

Iskodar (Tajik: Искодар) is a village in Sughd Region, northern Tajikistan. It is part of the jamoat Dardar in the Ayni District. It has a population of 1,332 people as of 2017.
