= Anthem of the Tajik Soviet Socialist Republic =

Surudi Milliy JŞS Tojikiston
English: State Anthem of the Tajik Soviet Socialist Republic
- Суруди Миллии ҶШС Тоҷикистон
- Regional anthem of the Tajik Soviet Socialist Republic Former national anthem of Tajikistan (Note: Without lyrics.)
- Lyrics: Abulqosim Lohutiy
- Music: Sulaymon Yudakov, 1946
- Adopted: 1946
- Readopted: 1991 (without lyrics)
- Relinquished: 1991 (with lyrics); September 1994 (music only)
- Succeeded by: "Surudi Milliy"

Audio sample
- Official orchestral and choral vocal recording: file; help

1968 official band instrumental recording
Performed by the Brass Band of the Ministry of Defence of the USSR

The State Anthem of the Tajik Soviet Socialist Republic (Note: Tajik: Суруди миллии Ҷумҳурии Шӯравии Сосиалистии Тоҷикистон, romanized: Surudi milliyi Jumhuriyi Sho‘raviyi Sosialistiyi Tojikiston, IPA: [sʊˈrudi mɪlˈlijɪ dʒʊmɦʊˈrijɪ ʃɵrɐˈʋijɪ sɔsɪʔɐˈlistɪjɪ tɔˌdʒikɪsˈtɔn]; Russian: Государственный гимн Таджикской Советской Социалистической Республики, romanized: Gosudarstvennyj gimn Tadžikskoj Sovetskoj Socialističeskoj Respubliki) was the regional anthem of Tajikistan when it was a constituent republic of the Soviet Union, known as the Tajik Soviet Socialist Republic. The music and the lyrics were created in 1946, and the anthem was adopted later that year. The lyrics were dropped after the dissolution of the Soviet Union in 1991, and the national anthem of the newly independent Tajikistan had used the same melody without any lyrics until 1994, when the country adopted a new anthem, under the title "Surudi Milliy", with new lyrics, while retaining the same melody.

== Background ==
The anthem was used between 1946 and 1994. The music was composed by Sulaymon Yudakov, and the lyrics were written by Abulqosim Lohutiy. The melody is preserved in "Surudi Milliy", the current national anthem of Tajikistan, with different lyrics. In 1977, the lyrics were changed to remove mentions of Joseph Stalin. This is the version presented here for the Tajik version, but the Russian version given here is the old one.

Unlike other former Soviet countries, like Belarus, Kazakhstan, and Uzbekistan, that appropriated their old Soviet-era regional anthems as national ones but did so without the Soviet lyrics, Tajikistan retained the Soviet lyrics for some time before replacing them in 1994.

It is also one of the nine countries to continuously use their Soviet-era anthems; the other eight being Uzbekistan, Russia (since 2000), Kazakhstan (until 2006), Turkmenistan (until 1996), Belarus, Kyrgyzstan (until 1992), Azerbaijan (until 1992), and Ukraine (until 1992).

== Lyrics ==
=== Post-Stalinist lyrics ===
==== Tajik version ====
Cyrillic script

Чу дасти Рус мадад намуд,
бародарии халқи Совет устувор шуд,
ситораи ҳаёти мо шарорабор шуд.
Гузаштаҳои пурифтихори мо
ба ҷилва омаданду дар диёри мо, диёри мо
Мустақил давлати Тоҷикон барқарор шуд.

Ба ҳоли таб даруни шаб
Садои раъди даъвати Ленин фаро расид
Зи барқи байрақаш сиёҳии ситам парид
Саодати ҷовидон дар ин замин
Зи партия ба мо расид, ба партия сад офарин
Марду озода моро чунин ӯ бипарварид.

Шиори мо диҳад садо:
Баробарӣ, бародарӣ миёни халқи мо.
Зи хонадони мо касе намешавад ҷудо,
Ягонагиро ба худ сипар кунем
Ба сӯи фатҳи Коммунизм сафар кунем, сафар кунем,
Зинда бод мулки мо, халқи мо, Иттиҳоди мо.

Perso-Arabic script

،چو دست روس مدد نمود
،برادرئ خلق سوویت استوار شد
.ستارهٔ حیات ما شراره‌بار شد
گذشته‌های پرافتخار ما
به جلوه آمدند و در دیار ما، دیار ما
.مستقل دولت تاجیکان برقرار شد

به حال تب درون شب
صدای رعد دعوت لنین فرا رسید
ز برق بیرقش سیاهی ستم پرید
سعادت جاودان در این زمین
ز پارتیه به ما رسید، به پارتیه صد آفرین
.مرد آزاده مارا چنین نو بپرورید

شعار ما دهد صدا
.برابری، برادری میان خلق ما
،ز خاندان ما كسی نمی‌شود جدا
يگانگی را به خود سپر كنیم
،به سوی فتح كمونیزم سفر كنیم، سفر كنیم
.زنده باد ملك ما، خلق ما، اتحاد ما

Latin script

Chu dasti Rus madad namud,
Barodariyi xalqi Sovet ustuvor shud,
sitorayi hayoti mo sharorabor shud.
Guzashtahoyi puriftixori mo
Ba jilva omadandu dar diyori mo, diyori mo
Mustaqil davlati Tojikon barqaror shud.

Ba holi tab daruni shab
Sadoyi ra’di da’vati Lenin faro rasid
Zi barqi bayraqash siyohiyi sitam parid
Saodati jovidon dar in zamin
Zi partiya ba mo rasid, ba partiya sad ofarin
Mardu ozoda moro chunin o‘ biparvarid.

Shi’ori mo dihad sado:
Barobariy, barodariy miyoni xalqi mo.
Zi xonadoni mo kase nameshavad judo,
Yagonagiro ba xud sipar kunem
Ba so‘yi fathi Kommunizm safar kunem, safar kunem,
Zinda bod mulki mo, xalqi mo, Ittihodi mo.

IPA transcription (Note: See Help:IPA/Persian and Tajik phonology.)

[tʃu ˈdas.tɪ rus | mɐˈdad nɐˈmud |]
[bɐˌrɔ.dɐˈri.jɪ χɐlˈqɪ sɔˈʋet ʔʊs.tʊˈʋɔr ʃʊd |]
[sɪ.tɔˈra.jɪ ɦɐˈjɔ.tɪ mɔ ʃɐˌrɔ.rɐˈbɔr ʃʊd ǁ]
[gʊˌzɐʃ.tɐˈɦɔ.jɪ pʊˌrɪf.tɪˈχɔ.rɪ mɔ |]
[ba dʒɪlˈʋa ʔɔ.mɐˈdan.dʊ dar 𝄆 dɪˈjɔ.rɪ mɔ 𝄇]
[mʊs.tɐˈqɪl dɐʋˈla.tɪ tɔ.dʒiˈkɔn bɐr.qɐˈrɔr ʃʊd ǁ]

[ba ˈɦɔ.lɪ tab | dɐˈru.nɪ ʃab |]
[sɐˈdɔ.jɪ ˈraʔ.dɪ dɐʔˈʋa.tɪ ˈle.nin fɐ.ˈrɔ rɐˈsid |]
[zɪ ˈbar.qɪ bɐj.rɐˈqaʃ sɪ.jɔˈɦi.jɪ sɪˈtam pɐˈrid |]
[sɐ.ʔɔˈda.tɪ dʒɔ.ʋɪˈdɔn dar ʔin zɐˈmin ǁ]
[zɪ ˈpar.ti.jɐ ba mɔ rɐˈsid | ba ˈpar.ti.jɐ sɐd ʔɔ.fɐˈrin |]
[ˈmar.dʊ ʔɔ.zɔˈda ˈmɔ.rɔ tʃʊˈnin ʔɵ ˈbɪ.pɐr.ʋɐˌrid ǁ]

[ʃɪˈʔɔ.rɪ mɔ | dɪˈɦad sɐˈdɔ |]
[bɐˌrɔ.bɐˈri bɐˌrɔ.dɐˈri mɪˈjɔ.nɪ ˈχal.qɪ mɔ |]
[zɪ χɔ.nɐˈdɔ.nɪ mɔ kɐˈse nɐˌme.ʃɐˈʋad dʒʊˈdɔ |]
[jɐˌgɔ.nɐˈgi.rɔ ba χud sɪˈpar ˈkʊ.nem ‖]
[ba ˈsɵ.jɪ ˈfa.tɪ kɔ.muˈnizm 𝄆 sɐˈfar ˈkʊ.nem 𝄇 |]
[zɪnˈda bɔd ˈmʊl.kɪ mɔ | ˈχal.qɪ mɔ | ˌʔɪ.tɪˈɦɔ.dɪ mɔ ‖]

==== Russian version ====
Руси рука на все века
В семью могучую слила советский весь народ.
Над нами новая судьба в лучах зари встаёт.
Мы древней доблестью вновь сердца зажгли,
Повсюду слава гремит родной земли, родной земли.
В государстве таджикском таджик воле гимн поёт.

Под игом тьмы томились мы.
Но грянул громом благодатным Ленина призыв,
Багряной молнией сверкнуло знамя, тьму пронзив.
Счастливый день, вольный труд, стальную мощь
Нам партия-мать несёт, любимый вождь, любимый вождь.
Нас растила она, в трудах и в битвах закалив.

Велим сынам, подобно нам,
Крепить народов братство, наш святой советский строй,
И верность вечную хранить семье своей большой.
Единство стало нам вековым щитом.
И коммунизм на земле мы возведём, мы возведём.
Век живи, милый край, век живи, наш Союз родной!

==== English translation ====
When Russia's hand supported us,
The guild of the Soviet folk was created,
The star of our life was enlightened.
Oh, our pasts with effulgence filled
Came to vision into our land, our homeland.
An independent state of the Tajik folk was formed.

Feverishness during the night
The thunderous roar of Lenin's summon sounded
From the glow of his flag, there the dark oppression went
The eternal happiness that lies upon this Earth
Was delivered to us from the Party of hundred creations,
Like a father who fought for and nurtured us anew.

Our motto shall call to us
Equality, fraternity among our folk
From our family no one shall break apart
We shall craft a shield of unity
Toward communist victory we'll travel on, we'll travel on.
Long live our land, our folk, our union.

=== Original lyrics ===
==== Tajik version ====
Cyrillic script

Чу дасти рус мадад намуд,
бародарии халқи Совет устувор шуд,
ситораи ҳаёти мо шарорабор шуд.
Гузаштаҳои пурифтихори мо
ба ҷилва омаданду дар диёри мо, диёри мо
Мустақил давлати тоҷикон барқарор шуд.

Ба ҳоли таб даруни шаб
Садои раъди давъати Ленин ба мо расид
Зи барқи байрақаш сиёҳии ситам парид
Саодати ҷовидон дар ин замин
Дар ин замон ба мо расид аз(и) Сталин аз(и) Сталин
Марду озода моро чунин ӯ бипарварид.

Ба расми мо, зи насли мо
Касе намедихад амон бо хасми беҳаё.
Аз иттиҳоди советӣ намешавад ҷудо
Ягонагиро ба худ сипар кунем,
Ба душманон ҳамеша мо зафар кунем, зафар кунем,
Зинда бод мулки мо, насли мо, иттиҳоди мо.

Perso-Arabic script

،چو دست روس مدد نمود
،برادرئ خلق سوویت استوار شد
.ستارهٔ حیات ما شراره‌بار شد
گذشته‌های پرافتخار ما
به جلوه آمدند و در دیار ما، دیار ما
.مستقل دولت تاجیکان برقرار شد

به حال تب درون شب
صدای رعد دعوت لنین فرا رسید
ز برق بیرقش سیاهی ستم پرید
سعادت جاودان در این زمین
در اين زمان به ما رسيد عز(ى) ستالين عز(ى) ستالين
.مرد آزاده مارا چنین نو بپرورید

به رسم ما، ز نسل ما
.کسی نمی‌دهد امان با خصم بی‌حیا
از اتحاد سوویت نمی‌شود جدا
،يگانگیرا به خود سپر كنیم
،به دشمنان همیشه ما ظفر کنیم ظفر کنیم
.زنده باد ملک ما، نسل ما، اتحاد ما

Latin script

Chu dasti rus madad namud,
Barodariyi xalqi Sovet ustuvor shud,
sitorayi hayoti mo sharorabor shud.
Guzashtahoyi puriftixori mo
Ba jilva omadandu dar diyori mo, diyori mo
Mustaqil davlati tojikon barqaror shud.

Ba holi tab daruni shab
Sadoyi ra’di da’vati Lenin ba mo rasid
Zi barqi bayraqash siyohiyi sitam parid
Saodati jovidon dar in zamin
Dar in zamon ba mo rasid azi Stalin azi Stalin
Mardu ozoda moro chunin o‘ biparvarid.

Ba rasmi mo, zi nasli mo
Kase namedixad amon bo xasmi behayo.
Az ittihodi sovetiy nameshavad judo
Yagonagiro ba xud sipar kunem,
Ba dushmanon hamesha mo zafar kunem, zafar kunem,
Zinda bod mulki mo, nasli mo, ittihodi mo.

IPA transcription

[tʃu ˈdas.tɪ rus | mɐˈdad nɐˈmud |]
[bɐˌrɔ.dɐˈri.jɪ χɐlˈqɪ sɔˈʋet ʔʊs.tʊˈʋɔr ʃʊd |]
[sɪ.tɔˈra.jɪ ɦɐˈjɔ.tɪ mɔ ʃɐˌrɔ.rɐˈbɔr ʃʊd ǁ]
[gʊˌzɐʃ.tɐˈɦɔ.jɪ pʊˌrɪf.tɪˈχɔ.rɪ mɔ |]
[ba dʒɪlˈʋa ʔɔ.mɐˈdan.dʊ dar 𝄆 dɪˈjɔ.rɪ mɔ 𝄇]
[mʊs.tɐˈqɪl dɐʋˈla.tɪ tɔ.dʒiˈkɔn bɐr.qɐˈrɔr ʃʊd ǁ]

[ba ˈɦɔ.lɪ tab | dɐˈru.nɪ ʃab |]
[sɐˈdɔ.jɪ ˈraʔ.dɪ dɐʔˈʋa.tɪ ˈle.nin fɐ.ˈrɔ rɐˈsid |]
[zɪ ˈbar.qɪ bɐj.ɾɐˈqaʃ sɪ.jɔˈɦi.jɪ sɪˈtam pɐˈrid |]
[sɐ.ʔɔˈda.tɪ dʒɔ.ʋɪˈdɔn dar ʔin zɐˈmin ǁ]
[dar ʔin zɐˈmɔn ba mɔ rɐˈsid | 𝄆 ʔɐˈzi ˈsta.lin 𝄇 |]
[ˈmar.dʊ ʔɔ.zɔˈda ˈmɔ.rɔ tʃʊˈnin ʔɵ ˈbɪ.pɐr.ʋɐˌrid ǁ]

[ba ˈras.mɪ mɔ | zɪ ˈnas.lɪ mɔ |]
[kɐˈse nɐˌme.dɪˈχad ʔɐˈmɔn bɔ ˈχas.mɪ be.ɦɐˈjɔ |]
[ʔaz ˌʔɪ.tɪˈɦɔ.dɪ sɔˈʋe.tɪ nɐˌme.ʃɐˈʋad dʒʊˈdɔ |]
[jɐˌgɔ.nɐˈgi.rɔ ba χud sɪˈpar ˈkʊ.nem ‖]
[ba dʊʃ.mɐˈnɔn ˈɦa.me.ʃɐ mɔ | 𝄆 zɐˈfar ˈkʊ.nem 𝄇 |]
[zɪnˈda bɔd ˈnas.lɪ mɔ | ˈχal.qɪ mɔ | ˌʔɪ.tɪˈɦɔ.dɪ mɔ ‖]

==== Russian version ====
Руси рука на все века,
В семью могучую слила Советский весь народ.
Над нами новая судьба в лучах зари встаёт.
Мы древней доблестью вновь сердца зажгли,
Повсюду слава гремит родной земли, родной земли.
В государстве Таджикском Таджик воле гимн поёт.

Под игом тьмы томились мы.
Но грянул громом благодатным Ленина призыв,
Багряной молнией сверкнуло знамя, тьму пронзив.
Счастливый день, вольный труд, стальную мощь
Несёт нам Сталин родной, любимый вождь, любимый вождь.
Как отец, нас растил он, в трудах, в битвах закалив.

Велим сынам, подобно нам,
Рукою грозною разить бесчестный вражий строй
И верность вечную хранить семье своей большой.
Единство стало щитом нам боевым.
Во всех сраженьях врагов мы победим, мы победим.
Век живи, милый край, век живи, наш Союз родной!

==== English translation ====
When Russia's hand supported us,
The guild of the Soviet folk was created,
The star of our life was enlightened.
Oh, all our pasts with effulgence filled
Came to vision into our land, our homeland.
An independent state of the Tajik folk was formed.

Feverishness during the night,
The thunderous roar of Lenin's summon sounded.
From the glow of his flag, there dark oppression went.
The eternal happiness that lies upon this Earth.
'Twas since this time that we've reached good ol' Stalin, good ol' Stalin.
Like a father who fought for and nurtured us anew.

In our image, our lineage,
No one is spared with indignant hostility.
For we are inseparable from the Union.
We shall craft a shield of unity,
Against the enemies we shall always triumph, always triumph!
Long live our land, our age, our union.
