= Zerobod =

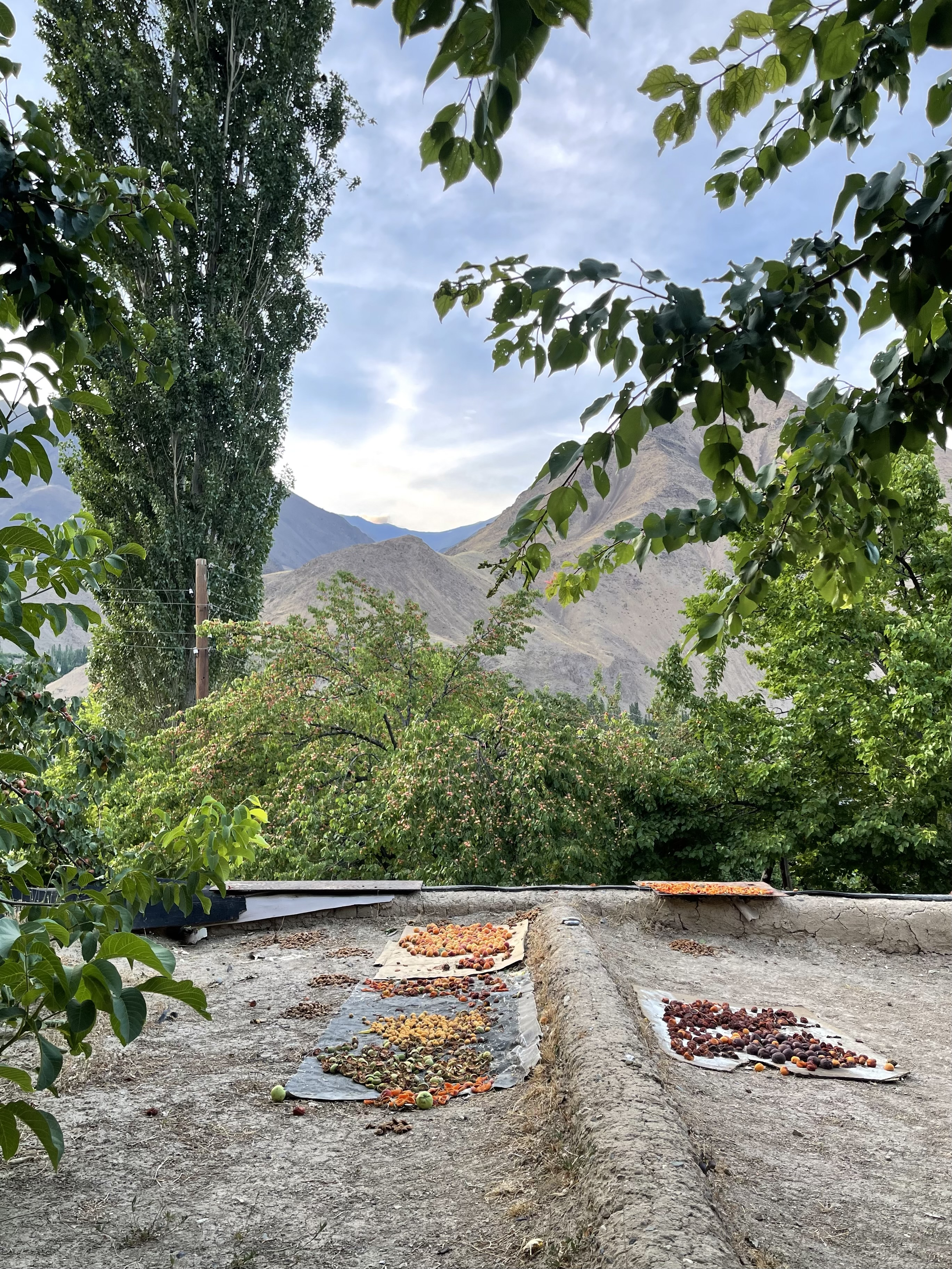

- Location in Tajikistan
- Coordinates: 39°25′41″N 68°27′34″E
- Country: Tajikistan
- Region: Sughd Region
- District: Ayni District
- Official languages: Russian (Interethnic); Tajik (State)

Zerobod (Russian: Зеробад; Tajik: Зеробод) is a village in Sughd Region, northern Tajikistan. It is part of the jamoat Dardar in the Ayni District.
