= Dardar =

Dardar Дардар
- Village and Jamoat
- Location in Tajikistan
- Coordinates: 39°26′35″N 68°26′42″E
- Country: Tajikistan
- Region: Sughd Region
- District: Ayni District

Population (2015)
  - Total: 7,562
- Time zone: UTC+5 (TJT)

Dardar (Tajik: Дардар, Dardar) is a village and jamoat in Ayni District in Sughd Region in north-west Tajikistan, not far from the border with Uzbekistan. It is situated on the northern bank of the Zeravshan, along Highway A377, to the northwest of Ayni on the road to Urmetan. The jamoat has a total population of 7,562 (2015). It consists of 6 villages, including Dardar (the seat), Iskodar, Khayrobod and Zerobod. Approaching the town the "wide ivan of a mosque dating from the 19th century can be seen from the road".

== Notable people ==
- Gulnazar Keldi (1945-2020) -poet, the author of the anthem of Tajikistan
