= State Anthem of Uzbekistan =

Özbekiston Respublikasining Davlat Madhiyasi
English: State Anthem of the Republic of Uzbekistan
- Sheet music
- National anthem of Uzbekistan
- Lyrics: Abdulla Oripov, 1992
- Music: Mutal Burhonov, 1947
- Adopted: 1991

Audio sample
- U.S. Navy Band instrumental rendition in F major: file; help

Official band and vocal recording in G major

The State Anthem of the Republic of Uzbekistan (Note: Uzbek: Oʻzbekiston Respublikasining Davlat madhiyasi, cyrillized: Ўзбекистон Республикасининг Давлат Мадҳияси, arabized: اۉزبېكستان جمهوریتينىنگ دولت مدحيەسى) was officially adopted on 10 December 1991 by the Constitution of Uzbekistan, after gaining independence from the Soviet Union. The lyrics were written by Uzbek poet Abdulla Oripov, set to the melody composed by Soviet Uzbek composer Mutal Burhonov.

== History ==
The State Anthem of the Republic of Uzbekistan was officially approved on 10 December 1992 under Law "On the State Anthem of the Republic of Uzbekistan" by the Resolution of the Supreme Council of the Republic of Uzbekistan. Previously, there had been many attempts at creating a national anthem with new lyrics for Uzbekistan upon independence from the Soviet Union; the version written by well-known composer Abdulla Oripov was officially chosen in completion of the new national anthem. Oripov's words were set to the tune composed by Soviet Uzbek composer Mutal Burhonov in 1947; the melody is identical to that of the Anthem of the Uzbek Soviet Socialist Republic with no subsequent changes. Uzbekistan is one of the four post-Soviet states – alongside Belarus, Russia, and Tajikistan – that continue to use the Soviet-era tune for their current anthems.

The National Symphony Orchestra of Uzbekistan is officially considered the first performer of Uzbekistan's national anthem. In July 2006, the anthem was re-recorded for performance at state events, on radio and television.

On 10 December 2019, 28 years after the official establishment of the national anthem, Uzbek writer Oraz Abdurazakov translated the lyrics of the anthem into Russian. In his speech on 14 April 2020, dedicated to measures to combat the COVID-19 pandemic in Uzbekistan, President Shavkat Mirziyoyev quoted a part of Oraz Abdurazakov's translation: "The National Anthem contains such profound lines: 'The power of ancestors, their glory is forever with you! The spirit of great people is rightfully given to us.'"

== Lyrics ==
=== Uzbek official ===
Latin script (official)	Latin script (2027)	Cyrillic script
Serquyosh, hur o’lkam, elga baxt, najot, Sen o’zing do’stlarga yo’ldosh, 𝄆 mehribon 𝄇! Yashnagay to abad ilmu fan, ijod, Shuhrating porlasin toki bor jahon! Naqarot: Oltin bu vodiylar — jon O’zbekiston, Ajdodlar mardona ruhi senga yor! Ulug’ xalq qudrati jo’sh urgan zamon, Olamni mahliyo aylagan diyor! Bag’ri keng o’zbekning o’chmas iymoni, Erkin, yosh avlodlar senga 𝄆 zo’r qanot 𝄇! Istiqlol mashʼali, tinchlik posboni, Haqsevar, ona yurt, mangu bo’l obod! Naqarot	Serquyoş, hur ölkam, elga baxt, najot, Sen özing döstlarga yöldoş, 𝄆 mehribon 𝄇! Yaşnagay to abad ilmu fan, ijod, Şuhrating porlasin toki bor jahon! Naqarot: Oltin bu vodiylar — jon Özbekiston, Ajdodlar mardona ruhi senga yor! Uluğ xalq qudrati jöş urgan zamon, Olamni mahliyo aylagan diyor! Bağri keng özbekning öçmas iymoni, Erkin, yoş avlodlar senga 𝄆 zör qanot 𝄇! Istiqlol maşʼali, tinçlik posboni, Haqsevar, ona yurt, mangu böl obod! Naqarot	Серқуёш, ҳур ўлкам, элга бахт, нажот, Сен ўзинг дўстларга йўлдош, 𝄆 меҳрибон 𝄇! Яшнагай то абад илму фан, ижод, Шуҳратинг порласин токи бор жаҳон! Нақарот: Олтин бу водийлар — жон Ўзбекистон, Аждодлар мардона руҳи сенга ёр! Улуғ халқ қудрати жўш урган замон, Оламни маҳлиё айлаган диёр! Бағри кенг ўзбекнинг ўчмас иймони, Эркин, ёш авлодлар сенга 𝄆 зўр қанот 𝄇! Истиқлол машъали, тинчлик посбони, Ҳақсевар, она юрт, мангу бўл обод! Нақарот
Arabic script	IPA transcription (Note: See Help:IPA/Uzbek and Uzbek phonology.)	
،سېرقوياش، حر اۉلكم، اېلگه بخت، نجات !𝄆 مهربان 𝄇 ،سېن اۉزينگ دوستلرگە يۉلداش ،يشنەگى تا ابد ايلمو فن، ايجاد !شهرەتينگ پارلسين تاكى بار جهان :نقرات ،آلتين بو واديلر — جان اۉزبېكستان !اجدادلر مردانە روحى سېنگە يار ،اولوغ خلق قدرەتى جۉش اورگن زمان !آلمنى مهليا ايلەگن ديار ،بغرى كېنگ اۉزبېكنينگ اۉچمس ايمانى !𝄆 زۉر قنات 𝄇 اېركين، ياش اولادلر سېنگه ،استقلال مشعلى، تينچليک پاسبانى !حقسېور، آنە يورت، منگو بۉل اباد نقرات	[ser.qʊˈjɔʃ | ɦʊr ʔɵlˈkam | ʔelˈga | baχt nɐˈdʒɔt |] [sen ʔɵˈzɪŋ dɵst.lɐrˈga jɵlˈdɔʃ | 𝄆 meɦ.rɪˈbɔn 𝄇 ‖] [jɐʃ.nɐˈɡaj tɔ ʔɐˈbad ʔɪlˈmʊ fan ʔɪˈdʒɔt |] [ʃʊɦ.rɐˈtɪŋ pɔr.lɐˈsɪn tɔˈkɪ bɔr dʒɐˈɦɔn ‖] [nɐ.qɐˈrɔt] [ʔɔlˈtɪn bʊ ʋɔ.diˈlar | dʒɔn ʔɵzˌbe.kɪsˈtɔn |] [ʔɐdʒ.dɔdˈlar mɐɾ.dɔˈna rʊˈɦɪ seŋˈga jɔr ‖] [ʔʊˈlʊʁ χalq qʊd.rɐˈtɪ dʒɵʃ ʔʊrˈgan zɐˈmɔn |] [ʔɔ.lɐmˈnɪ mɐɦ.liˈjɔ ʔɐj.lɐˈgan | diˈjɔr ‖] [bɐʁˈrɪ keŋ | ʔɵz.bekˈnɪŋ | ʔɵtʃˈmas | ʔi.mɔˈnɪ |] [ʔerˈkɪn jɔʃ ʔɐʋ.lɔdˈlar seŋˈɡa | 𝄆 zɵr qɐˈnɔt 𝄇 ‖] [ʔɪs.tɪqˈlɔl mɐʃ.ʔɐˈlɪ tɪntʃˈlɪk pɔs.bɔˈnɪ |] [ɦɐq.seˈʋar ʔɔˈna jʊrt | mɐŋˈɡʊ bɵl ʔɔˈbɔd ‖] [nɐ.qɐˈrɔt]	

=== English translation ===
My country, sunny and free, salvation to your people,
You are a warmhearted companion 𝄆 to your friends 𝄇!
Flourish eternally with knowledge and invention,
May your fame shine as long as the world exists!

Chorus:
These golden valleys – dear Uzbekistan,
Manly spirit of ancestors is companion to you!
When the great power of people became exuberant
You are the country that amazes the world!

Belief of generous Uzbek does not die out,
Free, young children are a strong 𝄆 wing for you 𝄇!
The torch of independence, guardian of peace,
Just motherland be eternally prosperous!

Chorus

Translation:
