= Khayrobod, Ayni District =

Village in northern Tajikistan, Sughd Region

Khayrobod
- Location in Tajikistan
- Coordinates: 39°27′N 68°23′E
- Country: Tajikistan
- Region: Sughd Region
- District: Ayni District

Khayrobod (Tajik: Хайробод) is a village in Sughd Region, northern Tajikistan. It is part of the jamoat Dardar in the Ayni District.
