= Jūlijs Vanags =

Latvian writer

Jūlijs Vanags (8 July [O.S. 25 June] 1903, Ungurmuiža Parish (now Jēkabpils district), Russian Empire – 12 October 1986, Riga, Latvian SSR) was a Latvian and Soviet writer and a co-author of the text of the Anthem of the Latvian SSR. He also wrote plays, children's books, poetry, stories and translated many works into Latvian including Leo Toltsoy's Anna Karenina, Alexander Pushkin's Ruslan and Ludmilla and The Stone host by Lesya Ukrainika.
