= Gulnazar Keldi =

Tajik poet, writer of the national anthem (1945–2020)

Keldi in 2018

Gulnazar Keldi (Tajik: Гулназар Келдӣ; 20 September 1945 – 13 August 2020) was a Tajikistani poet from Dardar and editor of the publication Adabiyet va sanat (Literature and Art). Keldi wrote the lyrics of "Surudi Milli", the national anthem of Tajikistan.

== Biography ==
He was born in Dardar, Falgar District, within the Leninabad Region (now the Sughd Region).His father was Keldi Mirzoev and his mother Lola Mirzoeva.

In 1966, he graduated from the Faculty of Literature and Language of the Tajik State University in Dushanbe. Immediately after graduation, he began working as a correspondent, later as deputy editor-in-chief of the youth newspaper “Komsomol of Tajikistan”. In 1968, Keldiev became a member of the Union of Journalists of the Tajik SSR. In 1973, he moved to the position of deputy director of the literary magazine “Sadoi Sharq” (“Voice of the East”). In 1975-1977, he was a translator for Soviet specialists in Afghanistan. In 1977, he returned to work at the literary magazine Sadoi Sharq. He worked as the head of the magazine's department until 1991.

He died from COVID-19 during the COVID-19 pandemic in Tajikistan. Buried at the Luchob cemetery in Dushanbe.
