= Anatoly Lepin =

Soviet composer

Anatoly Yakovlevich Lepin (Russian: Анато́лий Я́ковлевич Ле́пин; Latvian: Anatols Liepiņš; 30 December [O.S. 17 December] 1907, in Moscow – 24 October 1984, in Moscow) was a Soviet composer of Latvian origin.

He was born in 1907 into the family of Jēkabs Liepiņš, a Latvian instrument tuner, who had recently moved to Moscow. He graduated from the Moscow Conservatory in 1936, having studied composition with A. N. Aleksandrov, and went on to teach in Tashkent from 1936 to 1938 then in Kharkiv from 1938 to 1939.

He lived in Riga from 1945 to 1950, and during that period composed the Anthem of the Latvian SSR.

Lepin was married to Milica Svarenieks, a ballerina of Latvian origin, with whom he had a son, Leonid (b. 1946), and a daughter – Tatyana (b. 1953). Lepin died in 1984 and was buried at the Vagankovo Cemetery in Moscow.
