= Anthem of the Latvian Soviet Socialist Republic =

Latvijas Padomju Sociālistiskās Republikas himna
English: State Anthem of the Latvian SSR
- Sheet music
- Former regional anthem of the Latvian SSR
- Lyrics: Fricis Rokpelnis and Jūlijs Vanags
- Music: Anatols Liepiņš
- Adopted: 19 July 1945
- Relinquished: 15 February 1990
- Preceded by: "Dievs, svētī Latviju!"
- Succeeded by: "Dievs, svētī Latviju!"

Audio sample
- Vocal rendition in F major: file; help

Instrumental rendition in E major

The State Anthem of the Latvian Soviet Socialist Republic was the anthem of Latvia from 1945 to 1990 when it was occupied by the Soviet Union.

The anthem was approved by the Supreme Soviet of the Latvian Soviet Socialist Republic on 19 July 1945, subsequently banning the previous anthem "Dievs, svētī Latviju!". The original lyrics had references to Joseph Stalin until its replacement in 1977, when the references of him were removed. After Latvia regained independence in 1990, "Dievs, svētī Latviju!" was restored as its anthem on 15 February 1990.

== Background ==
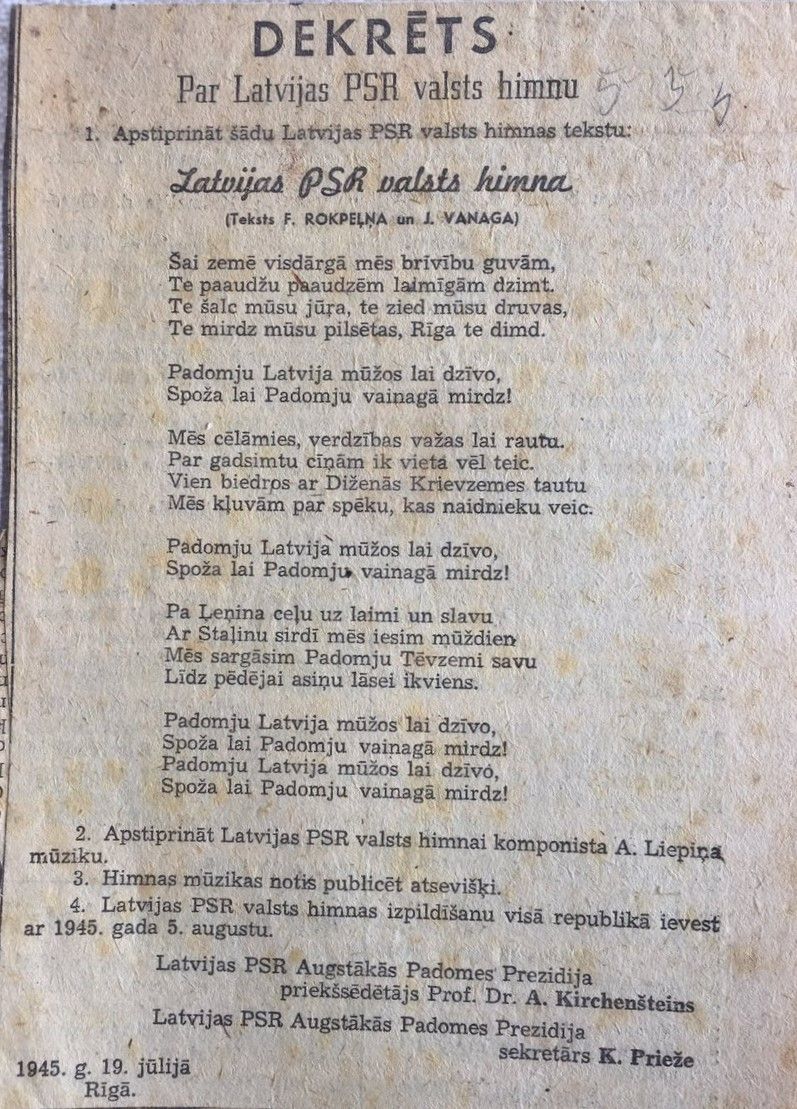
The decree on the Anthem of the Latvian SSR. The anthem was adopted on 19 July 1945.

The music was composed by Anatols Liepiņš, and the lyrics were written by Fricis Rokpelnis and Jūlijs Vanags.

== Lyrics ==
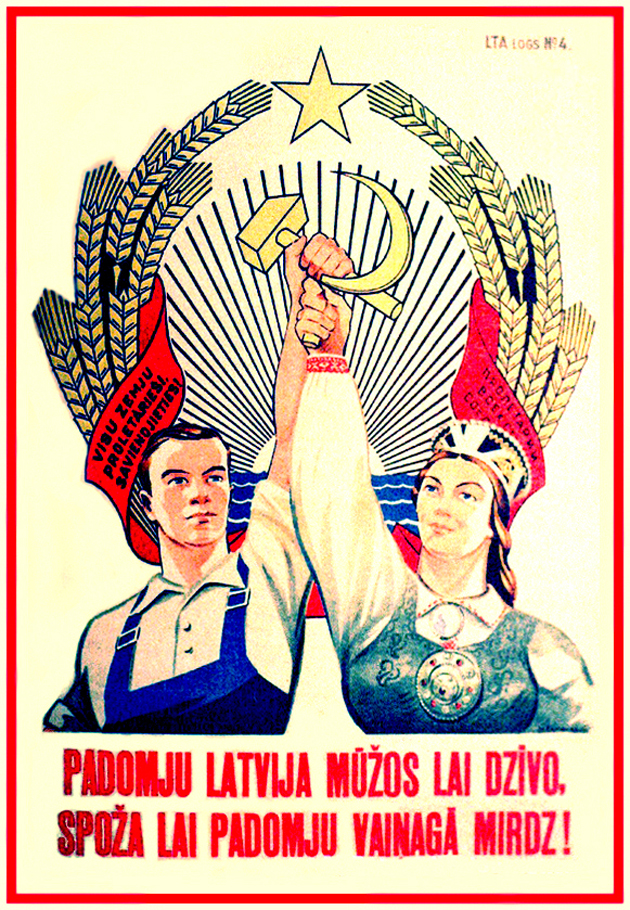
A poster with the chorus of the anthem

Latvian original

Šai zemē visdārgā mēs brīvību guvām,
Te paaudžu paaudzēm laimīgam dzimt,
Te šalc mūsu jūra, te zied mūsu druvas,
Te skan mūsu pilsētas, Rīga te dimd. (Note: The first verse before 1977 was: „Šai zemē visdārgā mēs brīvību guvām, Te paaudžu paaudzēm laimīgam dzimt, Te šalc mūsu jūra, te zied mūsu druvas, Te mirdz mūsu pilsētas, Rīga te dimd.“)

Piedziedājums:
Padomju Latvija mūžos lai dzīvo,
Spoža lai Padomju vainagā mirdz!

Mēs cēlāmies, verdzības važas lai rautu,
Par gadsimtu cīņām ik vieta vēl teic.
Vien biedros ar diženās Krievzemes tautu
Mēs kļuvām par spēku, kas pretvaru veic. (Note: The second verse before 1977 was: „Mēs cēlāmies, verdzības važas lai rautu, Par gadsimtu cīņām ik vieta vēl teic. Vien biedros ar diženās Krievzemes tautu Mēs kļuvām par spēku, kas naidnieku veic.“)

Piedziedājums

Pa Ļeņina ceļu uz laimi un slavu
Ar Oktobra karogu iesim mūždien.
Mēs sargāsim Padomju Tēvzemi savu
Līdz pēdējai asiņu lāsei ikviens. (Note: The third verse before 1977 was: „Pa Ļeņina ceļu uz laimi un slavu Ar Staļinu sirdī mēs iesim mūždien. Mēs sargāsim Padomju Tēvzemi savu Līdz pēdējai asiņu lāsei ikviens.“)

𝄆 Piedziedājums 𝄇

IPA transcription (Note: See Latvian phonology and Help:IPA/Latvian.)

[ʃˠɐɪ̯ˑ ˈzʲɛ.mʲɛː ˈvʲɪz.dˠaːr.gaː mʲɛːz‿ˈbrʲiː.vʲiː.bˠʊ ˈgʊ.vˠaːm |]
[tʲɛ ˈpˠɐ.ɐʊ̯.dʒˠʊ ˈpˠɐ.ɐʊ̯.dzʲɛːm ˈlˠɐɪ̯ˑ.mʲiː.gɐm dzʲɪmt |]
[tʲɛ ʃˠɐlˠts ˈmˠuː.sˠʊ ˈjuː.rˠɐ tʲɛ zʲiət ˈmˠuː.sˠʊ ˈdrˠʊ.vˠɐs |]
[tʲɛ skɐn ˈmˠuː.sˠʊ ˈpʲɪlˠ.sʲæː.tˠɐs ˈrʲiː.gɐ tʲɛ dʲɪmt ‖]

[ˈpʲiə.dzʲiə.dˠɐ.jʊ(m)s]
[ˈpˠɐ.dˠuə.mʲʊ ˈlˠɐt.vʲɪ.jɐ | ˈmuˠː.ʒˠuəs ˈlˠɐɪ̯ˑ ˈdzʲiː.vˠuə |]
[ˈspˠuə.ʒˠɐ ˈlˠɐɪ̯ˑ ˈpˠɐ.dˠuə.mʲʊ | ˈvˠɐɪ̯ˑ.nˠɐ.gaː mʲɪrts ‖]

[mʲɛːs ˈtsʲæː.lˠaː.mʲiəs | ˈvʲɛr.dzʲiː.bˠɐs ˈvˠɐ.ʒˠɐs ˈlˠɐɪ̯ˑ ˈrˠɐʊ̯.tˠʊ |]
[pˠɐr ˈgɐ.dzʲɪm.tˠʊ ˈtsʲiː.nʲaːm ɪɡ‿ˈvʲiə.tˠɐ vʲɛːlˠ tʲɛɪ̯ˑts ǁ]
[vʲiən ˈbʲiə.drˠuəs ɐr ˈdʲɪ.ʒʲɛ.nˠaːs ˈkrʲiəʊ̯.zʲɛ.mʲɛs ˈtˠɐʊ̯.tˠʊ |]
[mʲɛːs ˈklʲʊ.vˠaːm pˠɐr ˈspʲæː.kʊ kɐs ˈprʲɛd.vˠɐ.rˠʊ vʲɛɪ̯ˑts ǁ]

[ˈpʲiə.dzʲiə.dˠɐ.jʊ(m)s]

[pˠɐ ˈlʲɛ.nʲɪ.nˠɐ ˈtsʲɛ.lʲʊ ʊz ˈlˠɐɪ̯ˑ.mʲɪ ʊn ˈslˠɐ.vˠʊ |]
[ɐr ɔk.ˈtˠɔ.brˠɐ ˈkɐ.rˠuə.gʊ ˈiə.sʲɪm ˈmˠuːʒ.dʲiən ‖]
[mʲɛːs ˈsˠɐr.gaː.sʲɪm ˈpˠɐ.dˠuə.mʲʊ ˈtʲæːʊ̯.zʲɛ.mʲɪ ˈsˠɐ.vˠʊ |]
[lˠiːts ˈpʲɛː.dʲɛː.jɐɪ̯ˑ ˈɐ.sʲɪ.nʲʊ ˈlˠaː.sʲɛɪ̯ˑ ˈɪg.vʲiəns ‖]

𝄆 [ˈpʲiə.dzʲiə.dˠɐ.jʊ(m)s] 𝄇

Russian translation

Свободен навеки народ наш счастливый,
Путь светлый для всех поколений открыт.
Шумит наше море, цветут наши нивы,
В семье городов наша Рига гремит. (Note: The first verse before 1977 was: «Свободен навеки народ наш счастливый, Путь к счастью для всех поколений открыт, Шумит наше море, цветут наши нивы, В семье городов наша Рига гремит.»)

Припев:
Славься, Советская Латвия наша,
Ярко в созвездии республик сияй!

Не раз мы за волю ходили походом,
Бесправия цепи пытались разбить,
Лишь в дружбе незыблемой с русским народом
Смогли мы неправду и зло победить. (Note: The second verse before 1977 was: «Не раз на врага ополчались походом, Не раз мы пытались оковы разбить. Лишь с Русью Великой и Русским народом, Могли мы навеки врага победить.»)

Припев

Под знаменем Ленина к счастью и славе
Путём Октября мы победно идём.
Верны мы великой Советской державе
И кровь за неё, если надо, прольём! (Note: The third verse before 1977 was: «Дорогою Ленина к счастью и славе, Со Сталиным в сердце к победам идём! Верны мы могучей Советской державе, За честь её кровь нашу в битвах прольём!»)

𝄆 Припев 𝄇

English translation

In this land most dear we gained our freedom,
Generation upon generation blessed to be born here,
Here our sea sighs, here our fields blossom,
Here our cities ring out, here Riga resounds.

Chorus:
Let Soviet Latvia live forever,
Let it shine bright in the Soviet crown!

We rose to break chains of slavery,
About centuries' long struggles it is told in every place.
Only in fraternity with the great Russian nation
We became a power to wage revolution.

Chorus

On Lenin's road to blessings and glory,
With the flag of October we will go on forever.
We will guard our Soviet Fatherland,
Everyone to the last drop of our blood.

𝄆 Chorus 𝄇
