= Azat Muhadow =

Turkmenistan footballer

Personal information
- Full name: Azat Röwşenoviç Muhadow
- Date of birth: June 21, 1981 (age 45)
- Place of birth: Ashgabat, Soviet Union
- Height: 1.86 m (6 ft 1 in)
- Position: Defender

Team information
- Current team: FC Talyp Sporty

Senior career*
Years	Team	Apps	(Gls)
2006	Nisa Asgabat		
2007–2008	Mardinspor	13	(0)
2008–?	Kahramanmarasspor		
? – present	FC Talyp Sporty		

International career^{‡}
2007–present	Turkmenistan	1	(0)
- * Club domestic league appearances and goals as of July 13, 2009 ‡ National team caps and goals as of July 13, 2009

Azat Röwşenoviç Muhadow (born 21 June 1981) is a Turkmenistan footballer currently playing for FC Talyp Sporty as a defender.

== Club career stats ==
Last update: 13 July 2008

Season	Team	Country	Division	Apps	Goals
2006	Nisa Asgabat	Turkmenistan	1	?	?
07/08	Mardinspor	Turkey	2	13	0
08/09	Kahramanmarasspor	Turkey	4		
