= Fricis Rokpelnis =

Latvian writer

Fricis Rokpelnis (6 October 1909 in Alkšņos, Courland, Russian Empire – 15 September 1969 in Jūrmala, Latvian SSR) was a Soviet and Latvian poet, writer and screenwriter, who is best known for writing the lyrics to the Anthem of the Latvian Soviet Socialist Republic.

== Biography ==
He was born in Alkšņos to a poor family. After the occupation of Latvia in 1940, Rokpelnis worked closely with the communist regime, becoming one of the most visible collaborators who came from the Latvian literary environment. From 1947. A member of the CPSU, Rokpelnis held various high administrative positions and co-authored the anthem of the Latvian SSR. He was also a USSR Supreme Council Member (1946-1950) and Latvian SSR Supreme Council Member (1950-1954). Fricis Rokpelnis was the father of poet Janis Rokpelnis.

== Major works ==
- Collection of poems "A sister star on the flag" (1950)
- Selection "Rye bread" (1959)
- The play "The Light" (1945)
- The play "Rainy Youth" (1948)
- Film Festival "Rainis" (1949)
- movie theater for the film "Atbalss" (1959)

He also wrote libretto for the Soviet political propaganda opera "On the New Coast" (1954) and "Audriņi" (1963).
