= Mutal Burhonov =

Soviet Uzbek composer (1916–2002)

Mutavakkil (Mutal) Burhonov (Мутаваккил [Мутал] Бурҳонов/مۇتەۋەككىل [مۇتەل] بۇرحاناۋ; Russian: Мутаваккиль [Муталь] Музаинович Бурханов); Bukhara, 5 May [O.S. 22 April] 1916 – June 15, 2002) was a Soviet and later Uzbek composer. He was awarded the title People's Artist of the Uzbek SSR in 1976.

== Career ==
Burhonov composed numerous songs, including the Anthem of Uzbek SSR.
