= Suleiman Yudakov =

Soviet Bukharan Jewish composer (1916–1990)

Background information
- Born: 14 April 1916; Kokand, Russian Empire
- Died: 5 November 1990 (aged 74) Tashkent, Uzbek SSR
- Occupation: Composer

Suleiman (Solomon) Alexandrovich Yudakov (Russian: Сулейман Александрович Юдаков; 14 April 1916 – 5 November 1990) was a Soviet composer.

== Biography ==
Suleiman Yudakov, a Bukharian Jew, was born in Kokand, and started to devote himself to music in the orphanage where he spent three years of his childhood. His first teacher there was Mikhail Naigof. In 1932, he was accepted to the so-called rabfak (рабочий факультет, or workers' faculty - an educational establishment set up to prepare workers and peasants for higher education) of the Moscow Conservatory majoring as a flautist. In 1939, Suleiman Yudakov became a student in the class of Reinhold Glière at the conservatory's Department of Composing. In 1941, he had to interrupt his studies due to the outbreak of the war and leave for Tashkent. From 1943 to 1946 he worked as artistic director at the Tajik State Philharmonic in Dushanbe, but then returned to Tashkent. He died on 5 November 1990. He was buried in Tashkent at the Bukharan-Jewish cemetery.

== Compositions ==
Yudakov's most famous piece was composing the melody of the Tajik SSR's regional anthem in 1944. This melody is still used as the national anthem of Tajikistan, the "Surudi Milli."

After the war, Suleiman Yudakov composed many works, including the first Uzbek comical opera, ballets, cantatas, and symphonic music:

- 1945 – "Сын", a drama ("The Son" in Russian; Tajik: Фарзанд, romanized: Farzand)
- "Восточная поэма" (Vostochnaya poema/Eastern Poem), for violin and piano
- "Fantasia for violin, violoncello and piano"
- "Dancing suite" for two pianos, in three parts.

== Awards ==
- Stalin Prize (1951)
- State Hamza Prize (1977)
- Order of the Red Banner of Labour (18 March 1959)
- Order of the Badge of Honour (6 December 1951)
- People's Artist of the Uzbek SSR (1976)
