= Turab Tula =

Soviet Uzbek writer

- Born: Turab Tulakhozhaev; December 24, 1918; Turbat village, Chimkent Oblast, Russian Empire
- Died: April 20, 1990 (aged 71); Tashkent, Uzbek SSR, Soviet Union
- Occupation(s): writer, poet, screenwriter
- Notable work: Sheʼrlar, Shodligim, Tabassum, Baxt tongotari, Oromijon
- Awards: People's Writer of the Uzbek SSR

Turab Tula (Тураб Тула), pseudonym of Turab Tulakhozhaev (Тураб Тулахожаев) (1918—1990) was a Soviet Uzbek writer, poet, and screenwriter. He was a recipient of the title People's Writer of the Uzbek SSR.

== Biography ==
He studied at the Tashkent Theatre Technical School from 1934 to 1937 and later attended the evening division of the Faculty of Language and Literature at the Tashkent State Pedagogical Institute from 1938 to 1941.

== Career ==
He worked as a literary employee for the newspaper Yosh leninchi, served as an editor and announcer at the Uzbekistan State Radio and held the position of literary secretary at the editorial office of the newspaper Qizil Oʻzbekiston.

Tula headed the script department at the Uzbekfilm studio from 1957 to 1962. He also served as secretary of the Union of Cinematographers and later headed the Arts Department under the Ministry of Culture.

He was director of the Hamza Theatre and subsequently led the Tashkent regional branch of the Writers’ Union and the Center for the Promotion of Literature.

== Works ==
His first poetry collection, Sheʼrlar (“Poems”), was published in 1939. This was followed by several collections of poems, songs, and narrative poems (doston), including Shodligim (1941), Tabassum (1944), Baxt tongotari (1948), Muborakbod (1949), Bolalar dostoni (1950), Qanotlan, qoʻshiqlarim (1955), Tanlangan asarlar (1958), Oromijon (1961), Gulyor (1968), and Oftob nayzada (1974).
