= Anthem of the Turkmen Soviet Socialist Republic =

Türkmenistan Sowet Sotsialistik Respublikasy Döwlet Gimni
English: State Anthem of the Turkmen Soviet Socialist Republic
- Түркменистан Совет Социалистик Республикасы Дөвлет Гимни
- Former regional anthem of the (Turkmen Soviet Socialist Republic) Turkmen SSR Former national anthem of Turkmenistan
- Lyrics: Collectively, 1978
- Music: Veli Mukhatov, 1946
- Adopted: 1946
- Readopted: 1991 (without lyrics)
- Relinquished: 1991 (with lyrics); 27 September 1996 (music only)
- Succeeded by: State Anthem of Turkmenistan

Audio sample
- 1968 official band recording: file; help

The State Anthem of the Turkmen Soviet Socialist Republic was used from 1946 to 1996. Lyrics were removed in 1991 as a result of the dissolution of the Soviet Union and the gaining of independence of Turkmenistan. The current State Anthem of Turkmenistan later replaced the Turkmen SSR anthem in 1996.

== Background ==
Vocal version

US Navy Band post-1991 version

It was used from 1946 to 1996. The music was composed by Veli Mukhatov, who also composed the current national anthem of Turkmenistan; the lyrics were written by Aman Kekilov and a group of authors. On 12 April 1978, the original lyrics were changed to remove mentions of Joseph Stalin. After Turkmenistan's independence was declared, the song's melody was still used until late 1996. However, there were no lyrics in the new version.

== Lyrics ==
=== 1978–1991 version ===
Turkmen original

I
Дең хукуклы халклармызың достлугы
Совет илин бир машгала өвүрди!
Бу достлугың аркадагы Рус халкы
Эгсилмез доганлык көмегин берди.

Гайталама:
Яша сен, кувватлан, эй азат Ватан!
Баряң Коммунизмиң еңшине бакан.
Ленин партиясындан гүйч алян, өсйән,
Совет Ватанымыз, җан Түркменистан!

II
Бейик Ленин ачды азатлык ёлун,
Бизе бакы ягты дурмуш гетирди.
Галкындырып әхли халкы хак ише,
Еңише, зәхмете, багта етирди.

Гайталама

III
Коммунизме баглап арзув–эркимиз,
Айдың гелҗегмизи дөредйәс, гуряс.
Гызыл байдагы биз берк тутуп голда,
Биз бейик максада ынамлы баряс.

Гайталама

Transliteration

I
Deň hukukly halklarmyzyň dostlugy
Sowet ilin bir maşgala öwürdi!
Bu dostlugyň arkadagy Rus halky
Egsilmez doganlyk kömegin berdi.

Gaýtalama:
Ýaşa sen kuwwatlan, eý azat Watan!
Barýaň Kommunizmiň ýeňşine bakan.
Lenin partiýasyndan güýç, alýan, ösýän.
Sowet Watanymyz, jan Türkmenistan!

II
Beýik Lenin açdy azatlyk ýolun,
Bize baky ýagty durmuş getirdi.
Galkandyryp ähli halky hak işe,
Ýeňişe, zähmete, bagta ýetirdi.

Gaýtalama

III
Kommunizme baglap arzuw-erkimiz,
Aýdyň geljegmizi döredýäs, gurýas.
Gyzyl baýdagy biz berk tutup golda,
Biz beýik maksada, ynamly barýas.

Gaýtalama

IPA transcription (Note: See Help:IPA/Turkmen and Turkmen grammar § Phonology.)

1
[dɛŋ χʊ.qʊq.ɫɨ χɑɫq.ɫɑɾ.mɨ.ðɯŋ dɔθt.ɫʊ.ɣɨ ǀ]
[θɔ.βʲɛt ɪ.lɪn bɪɾ mɑʃ.ɢɑ.ɫɑ œ.βʏɾ.dɪ ǁ]
[bʊ dɔθt.ɫʊ.ɣɯŋ ɑɾ.qɑ.dɑ.ɣɨ rʊθ χɑɫ.qɨ ǀ]
[ɛg.θɪl.mɛð dɔ.ɣɑn.ɫɯq ǀ kœ.mɛ.ɡɪn bɛɾ.dɪ ǁ]

[ɢɑj.tɑ.ɫɑ.mɑ]
[jɑ.ʃɑ θɛn ǀ qʊβ.βɑt.ɫɑn ǀ ɛj ɑðɑt βɑ.tɑn ǁ]
[bɑɾ.jɑŋ kɔm.mʊ.nɪð.mɪŋ jɛŋ.ʃɪ.nɛ bɑ.qɑn ǁ]
[lɛ.nɪn pɑɾ.tɪ.jɑ.θɯn.dɑn gʏjt͡ʃ ɑɫ.jɑn ǀ œθ.jæn ǀ]
[θɔ.βʲɛt βɑ.tɑ.nɯ.mɨð ǀ d͡ʒɑn tʏɾk.mɛ.nɪθ.tɑn ‖]

2
[bɛ.jɪk lɛ.nɪn ɑt͡ʃ.dɨ ɑ.ðɑt.ɫɯq jɔ.ɫʊn ǀ]
[bɪ.ðɛ bɑ.qɨ jɑɣ.tɨ dʊr.mʊʃ gɛ.tɪɾ.dɪ ǁ]
[ɢɑɫ.qɯn.dɨ.ɾɨp æh.lɪ χɑɫ.qɨ χɑq ɪ.ʃɛ ǀ]
[jɛ.ŋɪ.ʃɛ ǀ ðæh.mɛ.tɛ ǀ bɑɣ.tɑ jɛ.tɪɾ.dɪ ǁ]

[ɢɑj.tɑ.ɫɑ.mɑ]

3
[kɔm.mʊ.nɪð.mɛ bɑɣ.ɫɑp ɑɾ.ðʊ.βɛɾ.kɪ.mɪð ǀ]
[ɑj.dɯŋ gɛl.d͡ʒɛg.mɪ.ðɪ dœ.ɾɛd.jæθ ǀ ɢʊɾ.jɑθ ǁ]
[ɢɨ.ðɯɫ bɑj.dɑ.ɣɨ bɪð bɛɾk tʊ.tʊp ɢɔɫ.dɑ ǀ]
[bɪð bɛ.jɪk mɑq.θɑ.dɑ ɯ.nɑm.ɫɨ bɑɾ.jɑθ ǁ]

[ɢɑj.tɑ.ɫɑ.mɑ]

English translation

I
The bulwark of peoples' friendship is unbreakable.
The entire Soviet Union's become a united family!
And the Russians have become a stronghold of friendship.
We're blessed with happiness in our native land.

Chorus:
Sing to the native land sunny and free!
The Party of Lenin's a wise helmsman.
Your victorious step is headed towards communism,
Blossom, Soviet land! Flourish, dear Turkmenistan!

II
Lenin's paved us a clear way to freedom
And led us to eternal happy life.
He raised the people to fight for justice,
And inspired them to exploits and labour triumph!

Chorus

III
We selflessly serve the cause of communism,
We've tied our destinies to it – today to come.
And with the scarlet banner, the banner of the Motherland,
To the greatest aim valorously we march on!

Chorus

=== 1946–1978 version ===
Turkmen original

I
Дeң хукуклы халклармызын достлугы
Совет юрдин сармаз гала өвүрди!
Бу достлугын ёлбашчысы Рус халкы
Бизе-де доганлык, көмегин берди.

Гайталама I:
Яша хем шөхратлан, сен гөзел Ватан,
Дири гитмез саңа аягын атан!
Аямарыс сеңин үчин ширин җан
Гүнешли Ватанымыз, эй Түркменистан.

II
Ачып Ленин азатлыкын гиң ёлын
Бизи багта, шат дурмуша гетирди,
Халкың оглы, халк сердары Сталин.
Үстүнликден үстүнлиге етирди.

Гайталама II:
Яша хем шөхратлан, сен гөзел Ватан,
Дири гитмез саңа аягын атан!
Аямарыс сеңин үчин ширин җан
Гүллейән Ватанымыз, эй Түркменистан.

III
Советлер дөвринде өсди үлкәмиз,
Биз тарыхы арзүвмызга етишдик.
Совет союзының азат халкы биз
Хем зәхметде, хем гөрешде беркишдик.

Гайталама:
Яша хем шөхратлан, сен гөзел Ватан,
Дири гитмез саңа аягын атан!
Аямарыс сеңин үчин ширин җан
Мехрибан Ватанымыз, эй Түркменистан.

Transliteration

I
Deň hukukly halklarmyzyn dostlugy
Sowet ýurdin sarmaz gala öwurdi!
Bu dostlugyn ýolbaşçysy Rus halky
Bize-de doganlyk, kömegin berdi.

Gaýtalama I:
Ýaşa hem şöhratlan, sen gözel Watan,
Diri gitmez saňa aýagyn atan!
Aýamarys seňin üçin şirin jan
Güneşli Watanmyz, eý Türkmenistan.

II
Açyp Lenin azatlykyn giň ýolyn
Bizi bagta, şat durmuşa getirdi,
Halkyň ogly, halk serdary Stalin.
Üstünlikden üstünlige ýetirdi.

Gaýtalama II:
Ýaşa hem şöhratlan, sen gözel Watan,
Diri gitmez saňa aýagyn atan!
Aýamarys seňin üçin şirin jan
Gülleýän Watanmyz, eý Türkmenistan.

III
Sowetler döwrinde ösdi ülkämiz,
Biz taryhi arzüwmyzga ýetişdik.
Sowet soýuzynyň azat halky biz
Hem zähmetde, hem göreşde berkişdik.

Gaýtalama III:
Ýaşa hem şöhratlan, sen gözel Watan,
Diri gitmez saňa aýagyn atan!
Aýamarys seňin üçin şirin jan
Mehriban Watanmyz, eý Türkmenistan.

IPA transcription

1
[dɛŋ χʊ.qʊq.ɫɨ χɑɫq.ɫɑɾ.mɨ.ðɯŋ dɔθt.ɫʊ.ɣɨ ǀ]
[θɔ.βʲɛt jʊr.dɪn θɑɾ.mɑð ɢɑ.ɫɑ œ.βʏɾ.dɪ ǁ]
[bʊ dɔθt.ɫʊ.ɣɯŋ jɔɫ.bɑʃ.t͡ʃɯ.θɯ rʊθ χɑɫ.qɨ ǀ]
[bɪ.ðɛ.dɛ dɔ.ɣɑn.ɫɯq ǀ kœ.mɛ.ɡɪn bɛɾ.dɪ ǁ]

[ɢɑj.tɑ.ɫɑ.mɑ 1]
[jɑ.ʃɑ hɛm ʃœh.ɾɑt.ɫɑn ǀ θɛn gœ.ðɛl βɑ.tɑn ǀ]
[dɪ.ɾɪ gɪt.mɛð θɑ.ŋɑ ɑ.jɑ.ɣɯn ɑ.tɑn ǁ]
[ɑ.jɑ.mɑ.ɾɨθ θɛ.ŋɪn ʏ.t͡ʃɪn ʃɪ.ɾɪn d͡ʒɑn ǀ]
[gʏ.nɛʃ.lɪ βɑ.tɑnɯ.mɨð ǀ ɛj tʏɾk.mɛ.nɪθ.tɑn ‖]

2
[ɑ.t͡ʃɯn lɛ.nɪn ɑ.ðɑt.ɫɨ.qɯn gɪn jɔ.ɫɯn]
[bɪ.ðɪ bɑɣ.tɑ ǀ ʃɑt dʊr.mʊ.ʃɑ gɛ.tɪɾ.dɪ ǀ]
[χɑɫ.qɯŋ ɔɣ.ɫɨ ǀ χɑɫq θɛɾ.dɑ.ɾɨ θtɑ.lɪn ‖]
[ʏθ.tʏn.lɪk.dɛn ʏθ.tʏn.lɪ.gɛ jɛ.tɪɾ.tɪ ǁ]

[ɢɑj.tɑ.ɫɑ.mɑ 2]
[jɑ.ʃɑ hɛm ʃœh.ɾɑt.ɫɑn ǀ θɛn gœ.ðɛl βɑ.tɑn ǀ]
[dɪ.ɾɪ gɪt.mɛð θɑ.ŋɑ ɑ.jɑ.ɣɯn ɑ.tɑn ǁ]
[ɑ.jɑ.mɑ.ɾɨθ θɛ.ŋɪn ʏ.t͡ʃɪn ʃɪ.ɾɪn d͡ʒɑn ǀ]
[gʏl.lɛ.jæn βɑ.tɑnɯ.mɨð ǀ ɛj tʏɾk.mɛ.nɪθ.tɑn ‖]

3
[θɔ.βʲɛt.lɛɾ dœβ.ɾɪn.dɛ œθ.dɪ ʏl.kæ.mɪð ǀ]
[bɪð tɑ.ɾɯ.xɨ ɑɾ.ðʏβ.mɨð.ɢɑ jɛ.tɪʃ.dɪk ǁ]
[θɔ.βʲɛt θɔ.jʊ.ðɯ.nɯŋ ɑ.ðɑt χɑɫ.qɨ bɪð]
[hɛm ðæh.mɛt.dɛ ǀ hɛm gœ.ɾɛʃ.dɛ bɛɾ.kɪʃ.dɪk ǁ]

[ɢɑj.tɑ.ɫɑ.mɑ 3]
[jɑ.ʃɑ hɛm ʃœh.ɾɑt.ɫɑn ǀ θɛn gœ.ðɛl βɑ.tɑn ǀ]
[dɪ.ɾɪ gɪt.mɛð θɑ.ŋɑ ɑ.jɑ.ɣɯn ɑ.tɑn ǁ]
[ɑ.jɑ.mɑ.ɾɨθ θɛ.ŋɪn ʏ.t͡ʃɪn ʃɪ.ɾɪn d͡ʒɑn ǀ]
[mɛh.ɾɪ.bɑn βɑ.tɑnɯ.mɨð ǀ ɛj tʏɾk.mɛ.nɪθ.tɑn ‖]

English translation

I
The friendship of our people with equal rights,
The Soviet Union's transformed it into a fortress,
The leader of friendship is the Russian folk,
And the brotherhood's helped us as well.

Chorus I:
Long live and glorify, O beautiful Motherland,
If hardships try to overwhelm you,
We're willing to spare our lives for you,
Sunny Motherland, O Turkmenistan!

II
By opening the wide path of Lenin's freedom,
He has brought us to happiness,
Stalin, son and leader of the people,
From victory to victory.

Chorus II:
Long live and glorify, O beautiful Motherland,
If hardships try to overwhelm you,
We're willing to spare our lives for you,
Prosperous Motherland, O Turkmenistan!

III
Our country's developed during the Soviet era,
We've long achieved our dream,
We're a free people of the Soviet Union,
We're strong in both labour and struggle.

Chorus III:
Long live and glorify, ye beautiful Motherland,
If hardships try to overwhelm you,
We're willing to spare our lives for you,
Dear Motherland, O Turkmenistan!
