= Turkmen grammar =

Grammar of the Turkmen language

Turkmen grammar (Turkmen: Türkmen diliniň grammatikasy) is the grammar of the Turkmen language, whose dialectal variants are spoken in Turkmenistan, Iran, Afghanistan, Russia (in Stavropol krai), China (Salar Turkmens), Uzbekistan, Tajikistan and others. Turkmen grammar, as described in this article, is the grammar of standard Turkmen as spoken and written by Turkmen people in Turkmenistan.

Turkmen is a highly agglutinative language; that is, much of the grammar is expressed by means of suffixes added to nouns and verbs. It is very regular compared with many other languages of non-Turkic group. For example, obalardan "from the villages" can be analysed as oba "village", -lar (plural suffix) and -dan (ablative case, meaning "from"); alýaryn "I take" as al "take", -ýar (present tense) and -yn (first person singular).

Another characteristic of Turkmen is vowel harmony. Most suffixes have two or four different forms, the choice between which depends on the vowel of the word's root or the preceding suffix. For example, the ablative case of obalar is obalardan "from the villages" but the ablative case of itler "dogs" is itlerden "from the dogs".

Verbs have six grammatical persons (three singular and three plural), various voices (active, passive, reflexive, reciprocal and causative), (Note: Derivational, see also § Additional suffixes.) and a large number of grammatical tenses. Meanings such as "not", "be able", "must" and "if", which are expressed as separate words in most other languages, are usually expressed with verbal suffixes in Turkmen. A characteristic of Turkmen which is shared by neighbouring languages such as Persian is that the perfect tense suffix (in Turkmen -miş, -myş) often has an inferential meaning, e.g. gelýärmiş "it would seem (they say) that he/she is coming".

Verbs also have a number of participial forms, which Turkmen makes plentiful use of. Clauses which begin with "who" or "because" in English are generally expressed by means of participial phrases in Turkmen. Meanings such as "behind", "for", "like/similar to" etc. are expressed as postpositions following the noun rather than prepositions before it.

== Phonology ==
The following phonemes are present in the Turkmen language:

=== Vowels ===
Turkmen contains phonemic short and long vowels, although the vowel length other than phonemes of üý and ä is not reflected in the orthography. Turkmen also employs vowel harmony, a process that is common in fellow Turkic languages. Vowels and their sounds are as follows:

	Front								Back							
	unrounded				rounded				unrounded				rounded			
	short		long		short		long		short		long		short		long	
Close	i/и	/ɪ/	i/и	/ɪː/	ü/ү	/ʏ/	üý/үй	/ʏː/	y/ы	/ɯ/	y/ы	/ɯː/	u/у	/ʊ/	u/у	/ʊː/
Mid	e/е	/ɛ/			ö/ө	/œ/	ö/ө	/œː/					o/о	/o/	o/о	/oː/
Open			ä/ә	/æː/					a/а	/ɑ/	a/а	/ɑː/				

Some optionally mark vowel length by macrons, as in daş¹ "far", daş² "outside", and dāş "stone"; or by a colon (:), as in da:ş. Despite the fact that ⟨ä⟩ is always long, it is optionally marked with one of these diacritics above, so the letter ⟨ä⟩ in some loanwords like şäher and ähli is pronounced short. Technically, all vowels have long and short variants (if including ē and short ä), but the existence of the previously-mentioned phonemes are fairly rare. The long ē only exists in the indefinite future suffix -ēr (the front variant never appears as **-är) and its compensatory lengthening unreflected in orthography (see § Phonological processes), while the short ä only exists in Persian loans and historical fusions (alyp gitmek → äkitmek).

Long vowels cause the final voiceless consonant to be voiced; compare ōt /oːd/ with dialectal Turkish od (both mean "fire").

==== Examples of short and long minimal pairs ====
Macrons are used for words containing long vowels.

Short	Meaning	Long	Meaning
at	'horse'	āt	'name'
bil	'know!'	bīl	'waist'
ot	'grass'	ōt	'fire'
pil	'elephant'	pīl	'shovel'
daş	'far'	dāş	'stone'
ýaz	'write!'	yāz	'spring'
tut	'catch!'	tūt	'mulberry'
öl	'die!'	ȫl	'wet'
Pairs without homographs
		ōn	"ten"

==== Vowel harmony ====
Like other Turkic languages, Turkmen is characterised by vowel harmony. In general, words of native origin consist either entirely of front vowels (inçe çekimli sesler) or entirely of back vowels (ýogyn çekimli sesler). Prefixes and suffixes reflect this harmony, taking different forms depending on the word to which they are attached.

The infinitive form of a verb determines whether it will follow a front vowel harmony or back vowel harmony. Words of foreign origin, mainly Russian, Persian or Arabic, do not follow vowel harmony.

In addition to this backness harmony, progressive rounding harmony is also found in Turkmen. There are few suffixes which exhibits written close vowel rounding harmony, like the genitive case ending (-iň/un/ün/yn), the (nominal) possessive suffixes, and past tense suffixes, but not with mid and open vowels, where it otherwise not reflected in the orthography.

The long phonemes /aː/, /æː/, and /ɯː/ always cancel labial harmony, while short /ɯ/ cancels it word-finally (umūmy is still pronounced as umūmy, but umūmylyk is pronounced umūmuluk). Labial harmony in loanwords are inconsistent, and it is only works in loans that assimilated to the Turkmen phonology like Perso-Arabic loans.

=== Stress ===
Turkmen stress usually falls in the last syllable, with a secondary stress in the first syllable of a word containing more than three syllables (abadan "prosperous" /ˌɑbɑˈdɑn/). The exceptions to this rule include some pre-accenting suffixes and particles (the stress moves to the previous syllable), and loanwords preserve its original stress.

=== Consonants ===
Turkmen consonant phonemes (shown with the letters of the Turkmen alphabet used to represent them), not including allophones:

		Labial		Dental		Alveolar		Postalv./ Palatal		Velar		Glottal	
Nasal		m/м	/m/			n/н	/n/			ň/ң	/ŋ/		
Plosive/ Affricate	voiceless	p/п	/p/			t/т	/t/	ç/ч	/t͡ʃ/	k/к	/k/		
Plosive/ Affricate	voiced	b/б	/b/			d/д	/d/	j/җ	/d͡ʒ/	g/г	/ɡ/		
Fricative	voiceless	(f/ф	/f/)	s/с	/θ/			ş/ш	/ʃ/			h/х	/h/
Fricative	voiced			z/з	/ð/			(ž/ж	/ʒ/)				
Approximant		w/в	/w/			l/л	/l/	ý/й	/j/				
Rhotic						r/р	/ɾ/						

Note that s/с and z/з represent /θ/ and /ð/, which are not [s] and [z], a unique feature among the Turkic languages (cf. ceceo in some Spanish dialects), it is shared by another Turkic language Bashkir, of which has both /s/~/z/ and /θ/~/ð/. The value /ʒ/ and /f/ only exist in loanwords. /s, z/ also occurs in Russian loanwords but its pronunciation may depend on the speaker's level of bilingualism with Russian.

Sounds /b, ɡ/ are realized as fricatives [v, ɣ] when in intervocalic positions and when after obstruents or taps. /ɡ/ also spirantizes to [ɣ] in word-final positions and when before obstruents.

Sounds /ɡ, k, l/ are heard as back [ɢ, q, ɫ] when within back-vowel environments.

=== Phonological processes ===
These consonant combinations are pronounced differently and assimilated in spoken Turkmen:

When written	When pronounced (spoken)
ç + d	şd
ç + l	şl
ç + j	şş
ş + j	şş
ç + s	şs
g + b	gw
l + d	ll
n + d	nn
s + d	ss
s + t	ss
t + s	ss
z + s	ss
t + ç	çç
z + d	zz

The phonemes /l/ and /ɾ/ are deleted when succeeded by indefinite future suffix -er (see § Verbs) and preceded by an identical vowel. Thus, geler (third-person singular indefinite future of gelmek 'to go') is actually pronounced as gēr. The phonemes /ɡ, ɢ/ spirantize to [ɣ, ʁ] before and after obstruents, after taps, word-finally, and intervocalically; and to [x, χ] before and after voiceless obstruents (i.e., /t, p, θ, ʃ, tʃ/). For example, agşam /ɑgˈʃɑːm/ → [ɑχˈʃɑːm].

Phonemes /b/, /d/, and /ɡ/ are devoiced to [p], [t] and [k], respectively, after voiceless consonants: e.g., ykbal → ykpal, açdy → aşty, etc.

== Nominals ==
=== Nouns ===
Turkmen has six cases: nominative, (specifically definite) accusative, dative, genitive, instrumental/ablative and locative. Plurals are formed from -lar/ler, but it is not used when the quantity is explicit. Nouns can also take possessive suffixes, see also § Personal morphemes.

=== Suffixes ===
Case suffixes
Case	Turkmen name	Ending
Nominative	Baş düşüm	-∅
Accusative	Ýeňiş düşüm	-(n)i (Note: If the noun ending in a vowel, the last vowel (of the noun) is automatically pronounced long.)
Genitive	Eýelik düşüm	-(n)iň
Ablative	Ýöneliş düşüm	-den
Locative	Wagt-orun düşüm	-de
Dative	Çykyş düşüm	-e
Unproductive cases
Equative	—N/a	-çe
Allative	—N/a	-eri, -ik
Instrumental	—N/a	-in

Nouns ending in -ç, -k, -p, -t are voiced to -j, -g, -b, and -d in accusative, genitive, and dative endings; however, it is somewhat inconsistent as some monosyllabic nouns do not follow rules, but other monosyllabic nouns containing a long vowel which is not reflected on the Turkmen orthography, do. The Turkmen genitive exhibits written labial harmony, yielding to -iň, -yň, -uň, and -üň.

When the noun ends in -e, the accusative, genitive, and dative ending became -äni, -äniň, and -ä (these endings were pronounced with long [æː]). Also notice that dative of vowel-ending nouns has its last letter can being removed and just simply -a or -ä. If the third-from-last vowel contain a rounded vowel, the vowels -i and -y are automatically changed to -ü and -u before locative and ablative cases (doly → doludan).

Dative, locative and ablative ending also has endings in -nden, -nde, and -ne, but it is only used when preceded by third-person singular possessive suffix (öýü, öýüni, öýünüň, öýünden, öýunde, öýune). After the second-person singular possessive suffix, the genitive ending -iň simply deletes (*öýüňiň → öýüň).

=== Vowel deletion ===
As in table below, ogul becomes ogly in accusative case. This vowel deletion occurred mostly in disyllabic nouns, when the first syllable is a short open vowel (including mid vowels) and last syllable is closed, while nouns with more than two syllables only applied to nouns with -iş/-yş verbal noun suffix and compounds containing nouns which retains its vowel deletion rules. These rules only apply to singular accusative, genitive, and dative cases; also with all single singular person possessive forms.

=== Examples of declension ===
Vowel lengths are included.

Case	Example	Consonant-ending nouns			Vowel-ending nouns			With consonant voicing	With vowel deletion
Case	Example	sygyr	ner	öý	ýara	gije	doly	köpek	ogul
Nominative	Sygyr yzyna geldi.	sygyr	ner	öý	ýara	gije	doly	köpek	ogul
Accusative	Men sygyry sagdym.	sygyry	neri	öýi	ýarāny	gijǟni	dolȳny	köpegi	ogly
Genitive	Men sygyryň guýrugyny çekdim.	sygyryň	neriň	öýüň	ýarānyň	gijǟniň	dolȳnyň	köpegiň	ogluň
Locative	Sygyrda näme günä bar?	sygyrda	nerde	öýda	ýarada	gijede	doluda	köpekde	ogulda
Ablative	Bu kesel sygyrdan geçdi. Men sygyrdan ýadadym.	sygyrdan	nerden	öýden	ýaradan	gijeden	doludan	köpekden	oguldan
Dative	Men sygyra iým berdim.	sygyra	nere	öýe	ýarā	gijǟ	dola	köpege	ogla

=== Adjectives ===
Adjectives typically come before the noun. Unlike Romance languages, adjectives does not agree with number or case of the following noun. Comparatives are made by the suffix -rek (follows vowel harmony), and superlatives are made analytically by adding iň or has before the adjective.

== Pronouns ==
Personal pronouns are inflected for cases; but unlike nouns, pronouns are inflected irregularly. Colloquially, genitive forms of singular pronouns were further fused to meň, seň, and oň, respectively. The irregular forms are in bold.

Personal pronouns
	1st person		2nd person		3rd person	
	Singular	Plural	Singular	Plural	Singular	Plural
Nominative	men	biz	sen	siz	ol	olar
Accusative	meni	bizi	seni	sizi	**ony**	olary
Genitive	meniň	biziň	seniň	siziň	**onuň**	olaryň
Ablative	menden	bizden	senden	sizden	**ondan**	olardan
Locative	mende	bizde	sende	sizde	**onda**	olarda
Dative	**maňa**	bize	**saňa**	size	**oňa**	olara

In addition to pronouns above, genitive pronouns can also has absolute possessive suffix -ky/ki by adding after genitive forms, resulting on forms meniňki, biziňki, seniňki, siziňki, onuňky, and olaryňky. This suffix can be also added on nouns.

The demonstrative pronouns include proximal bu and şu; medial ol and şol, and distal include all of medial demonstratives with addition of hol (all distal demonstratives are pronounced long ōl, şōl, and hōl). There are further distinctions between the demonstratives, the proximal şu is used for immediate objects while bu is for other objects; the distal hol is used for more distant objects, with remaining forms has no semantic differences (ol, şol). These demonstratives is also irregularly inflected like personal pronouns, with the oblique forms of bu, şu, ol, şol, and hol are mun-, şun-, on-, şon-, hon-; respectively.

Main interrogative pronouns include:

Question
	Translation
"what"	näme
"where"	nire
"when"	haçan
"who"	kim
"why"	näme üçin
"which"	haýsy
"how"	niçik

Other interrogative pronouns include näçe "how many", näçinji "which (of an ordinal series)", nädejerede "to what amount", nädip "how (manner)", nähili, neneň, and natüýsli "what kind of". With the exceptions of haýsy, naçan, and nähili, all interrogative pronouns are declinable like nouns.

=== Personal morphemes ===
Here is the personal suffixes:

Verbal
	1st person		2nd person		3rd person	
	Singular	Plural	Singular	Plural	Singular	Plural
Personal	-in	-is	-siň	-siňiz	-∅	-lar
Possessive	-im	-ik	-iň	-iňiz	-i	-iler
Indirective	-im	-ik/-imiz	-iň	-iňiz	-in	-lar
Negative habitual present	-emok	-emizok	-eňok	-eňizok	-enok	-enoklar
Negative indefinite future	-merin	-meris	-mersiň	-mersiňiz	-mez	-mezler

The "possessive" endings are not a true possessive, but rather attached to past and conditional tenses. Indirective particle and modal suffixes are ultimately have same suffixes, and the last syllable (-emok) of -ok suffixes lacks vowel harmony (ýazmak → ýazamyzok, but gelmek → gelemizok).

Nominal (in front vowels)
Possessive	Singular	Plural
1st person	-im	-imiz
2nd person	-iň	-iňiz
3rd person	-(s)i	

Despite the fact that nominal possessive suffixes only distinguishes number in first and second persons, the suffix -lary/leri in the meaning of "their" also exists. The singular and plural of 3rd person plural possessives are the same. These suffixes except for third-person suffixes has a written rounding harmony (in -im/um/üm/ym), but plural possessives (other than -leri) has a close unrounded vowel next to rounded vowel (imiz/umyz/ümiz/ymyz).

Nouns ending in -ç, -k, -p, and -t is also voiced to -j, -g, -b, and -d before vowel-starting suffixes, similarly to grammatical cases.

== Verbs ==
Verbs are conjugated for numbers (singular and plural), persons (first, second and third), tenses (present, past, and future), and moods (indicative, conditional, obligational, intentional, imperative). Infinitives are formed by the suffix -mek, according to the vowel harmony rules.

=== Tense suffixes ===
==== Finite tenses ====
Definite future, intentional, and obligational are does not inflect for person and have the same forms, thus an explicit subject pronoun is needed. Thus, these tenses always use däl for their negations (for compound tenses, the ending is placed after däl, i.e. geljekdim → geljek däldim).

Fusion occurs in spoken Turkmen, for example spoken -ýän for standard -ýärin.

Tense		Suffix	Example (in 3SG)
Uses "personal" suffixes	Present	-ýär	gelýär
Uses "personal" suffixes	Future indefinite	-er	geler
Uses "possessive" suffixes	Past	-di	geldi
Uses "possessive" suffixes	Pluperfect	-ipdi	gelipdi
Uses "possessive" suffixes	Plup. negative	-mändi	gelmändi
Uses "possessive" suffixes	Past unwitnessed	-ipdir	gelipdir
Uses "possessive" suffixes	Conditional	-se	gelse
Impersonal	Future definite	-jek	geljek
Impersonal	Intentional	-mekçi	gelmekçi
Impersonal	Obligational	-meli	gelmeli
Uses "-ok" suffixes	Present negative	-ok	gelenok

==== Continuous present ====
"Relic" simple present suffix -Ir can only be used in four verbs, oturmak "to sit", ýatmak "to sleep", durmak "to stand", and ýöremek "to walk" in these corresponding forms:

	Oturmak	Ýatmak	Durmak	Ýöremek
1SG	otyryn	ýatyryn	durun	ýörün
2SG	otyrsyň	ýatyrsyň	dursuň	ýörsüň
3SG	otyr	ýatyr	dur	ýör
1PL	otyrys	ýatyrys	durus	ýörüs
2PL	otyrsyňyz	ýatyrsyňyz	dursuňyz	ýörsüňiz
3PL	otyrlar	ýatyrlar	durlar	ýörlar

These special verbs are used to indicate a continuous action of something (general continuous actions in some parts of Turkmenistan), it is used with verb stem plus the converb suffix -yp/-ip. These forms can also be used alone, and past continuous can also be formed with third-person singular of these verbs + past tense suffixes.

Similar present continuous construction also occurs in Kazakh.

==== Imperatives ====
Ending
	singular	plural
1st person	-(e)ýin	-(e)liň
2nd person	-∅	-(i)ň
3rd person	-sin	-sinler

In addition to main imperatives, these imperative forms are somewhat more complex:

- 1st plural imperative (two people): -(a)ly/(e)li
- Informal polite: -sana/sene
- Formal polite:
  - Request: -(i)p + bersene
  - Command: -seňizläň
- Encouraging command: -ber
- Polite 1st singular imperative: -(e)ýin-le

==== Non-finites ====
Present participle	-ýän
Impersonal past participle	-(ä)n
Personal past participle	-dik
Future definite participle	-jek
Future indefinite participle	-er
Adverbial participle	-mäge
Converb	-ip

There is various ways to form gerund by using the suffix -(ý)iş/uş/üş/yş, -ma/me, the infinitive, or by infinitive + dative suffix -a/-e. There is also desiderative gerund formed by infinitive + nominal possessive suffix + accusative suffix (-magymy, -magyňy, magyny, ...), or by the suffix -as/äs. Note the negative of -er is -mez, same as future indefinite suffix.

=== Negation ===
There are multiple ways to negate Turkmen verbs. Negation of some verb tenses is with the particle däl, similar to English "not"; but also to negate nouns or adjectives.

Men şu kitaby okamaly däl.
1sg this book-ACC read-OBLIG NEG
"I do not have to read this book." or, "I should not read this book." (sentence elicited for the latter meaning)

Ol aç däl.
3sg hungry NEG
"He is not hungry." (note the lack of copula)

Kofe gyzgyn däl bolup biler.
"The coffee might not be hot."

Kofe gyzgyn dälmi?
"Isn't the coffee hot?"

The phonetically similar suffix -ok is another option: it attaches to the verb which it negates. It comes after the stem and before the tense suffix. The suffix -ok does not modify its form due to vowel harmony. In addition to -ok there is another suffix -me which placed before the tense suffix. It appears that -me is used when dealing with one event and -ok for more habitual or lasting states:

Men bilemok.
"I don't know."
Men bilemokdym.
"I didn't know (for a long time)."
Men bilmedim.
"I didn't know (on one occasion)."

(These correspond to the positive forms Men bilyärin, Men bilyärdim and Men bildim. The suffix -ok is irregularly inflected, see § Personal morphemes. Instead of forming *-mer, the negative indefinite future suffix yields -mez and it is also irregularly inflected. The converb -ip also has irregular negative -män)

Ol ajyganok.
3sg hunger-GER-NEG
'He is not hungry.' (cf. däl construction below); literally *'He is not hungering'

Speakers of Eastern dialects of Turkmen, influenced by Uzbek, are less likely to utilise the -ok suffix.

There is no an equivalent in Turkmen to the English prefix 'un-'. That is, one can't simply attach an affix to a verb to indicate the opposite action, as in wrap the present → unwrap the present. It appears that different tenses use different forms of negation, as in the following sentences:

Men ylgamok.
I am not running. (present)

Men ylgamadym.
I did not run. (past)

Men ylgajak däl.
I will not run. (definite future)

=== Evidentiality ===
Turkmen verbs can also mark evidentiality. Evidentiality of a reported event is determined by four markers, suffixed to the finite verb, roughly (the last syllable of -dirminäm lacks vowel harmony):

- -di (direct evidence, the past tense)
- -(i)pdir (hearsay)
- -dirminäm (indirect evidence)
- -miş (rumoured that)

Some independent particles may be said to convey evidentiality: one such word is the particle eken.

Aman syrkawla-p-dyr.
Aman {become sick-EV-COP}
(I heard that) Aman is sick.(information is "hearsay")

Compare 1 with 2.a and 2.b:

Aman syrkawla-dy.
Aman {become sick-3SG.PAST}

Aman syrkaw.
Aman sick.
Aman is sick. (speaker has spoken with Aman)

Maral Aşgabat-dan gel-ip-dir.
Maral Ashgabat-ABL come-EV-COP
(I heard that) Maral came from Ashgabat.

Ben sen-iň köke-ler-iň-i iý-di.
Ben you-GEN cookie-PL-2SG.POSS-ACC eat-3s.PAST
Ben ate your cookies.

i. The speaker saw Ben eat the cookies (direct evidence).

ii. Ben told the speaker that he ate the cookies.

Ben sen-iň köke-ler-iň-i iý-ip-dir.
Ben you-GEN cookie-PL-2SG.POSS-ACC eat-EV-COP
Ben ate your cookies.

i. The speaker heard from someone else that Ben ate the cookies (hearsay).

ii. Generally, the speaker learned through means other than 4.i and 4.ii that Ben ate the cookies.

Ben iý-ip-dir-mikä(n) sen-iň köke-ler-iň-i.
Ben eat-EV-COP-EV you-GEN cookie-PL-2SG.POSS-ACC
Ben ate your cookies, or more loosely: I wonder if Ben ate your cookies.

i. The speaker saw evidence of the action, i.e. crumbs, and "made the connection." (informant's account)

ii. The speaker "doesn't concretely know [Ben] ate them." (informant's account)

iii. In the words of the informant: "I am questioning myself. But it's not a question."

iv. In other words: a deduction from indirect evidence, a suspicion

Men (...) iý-ip-dir-in-mikäm?
I (...) eat-EV-1SG.PRES(?)-EV
Did I eat something?

i. The speaker questions whether or not s/he has performed an action.

ii. Evidence of the particular action may be direct, however the nature of its complement (i.e. an item of food) may be in doubt.

Ben iý-en-miş sen-iň köke-ler-iň-i.
Ben eat-PART be-RUM you-GEN cookie-PL-2SG.POSS-ACC
It is rumoured that Ben ate your cookies.

i. The action has been passed on via several speakers, or gossiped, similar to in the English gloss.

- Note the postposed complement in 7. A tree of 7 would look something like {(Ben [{(the one who ate [ti])} must be]) [your cookies] i} using different brackets only in order to make the nesting more obvious.
- In 6.a., the verb appears in the form iý-ip-dir-minäm. The final two syllables have been analyzed as one evidential particle, glossed as EV. This follows partly from the intuitions of the informant, and partly from the consistence: it always appears as -minäm. Nonetheless, it could also be glossed as ...eat-EV-COP-INT-what..., something like, literally, 'Did Ben eat your cookies, or what?'

== Additional suffixes ==
=== Interrogatives ===
Interrogatives are formed by the suffix -mi/my, it is not used when with interrogative pronouns like näme and kim.

=== Temporal ===
Temporal are marked with the suffix -ka/kä, the "possessive" personal suffixes (see also § Personal morphemes) was added to this suffix.

=== Verbal extensions ===
The causative suffixes -dir and -ir; and the passive, reflexive, and reciprocal suffixes exhibits written labial harmony. Only the verb görmek "to see" which takes the causative suffix -kez. Note that these suffixes were derivational.

- Passive: -(i)l (after most letters except -l, where it same as reflexive)
- Reflexive: -(i)n
- Reciprocal: -(i)ş
- Causative: -dir (after consonants); -t (after vowels); -ir; -üz; -er; -der

=== Others ===
- -da/de preceded by a hyphen (-) is used to make meanings like "and", "also", and "even though" in conditional statements.

== Syntax ==
The default word order in Turkmen is subject–object–verb (SOV). Verbs generally come at the end of the sentence or clause; and adjectives and possessive nouns come before the noun they describe. To mark absence of a noun or an adjective, is with the predicative adjective ýok.

Onuň maşyny ýok.
3sg car-GEN NEG
"He does not have a car."

Öýde Amandan başga adam ýok.
house-LOC Aman-INST except person NEG
"There is no one but Aman in the house."
