= Weli Muhadow =

Turkmen composer (1916–2005)

Welimuhammet Muhadow
- Also known as: Veli Muhadov
- Born: Velimuhammet Muhadov; 5 May 1916; Bagyr, Transcaspian Oblast, Russian Empire (now Turkmenistan)
- Died: 6 January 2005 (aged 88) Ashgabat, Turkmenistan
- Genres: Classical
- Occupation: Composer

Velimuhammet Muhadov or Welimuhammet Muhadow (Turkmen Cyrillic: Велимухаммет Мухадов; Russian: Велимухаммед Мухатов, romanized: Velimukhammed Mukhatov; 5 May [O.S. 22 April] 1916 – 6 January 2005), also known as Veli Muhadov or Weli Muhadow (Turkmen Cyrillic: Вели Мухадов; Russian: Вели Мухатов, romanized: Veli Mukhatov), was a Turkmen composer.

He composed numerous works, including several film scores, the regional anthem of the Turkmen SSR (which was used in the 1990s as the Turkmen national anthem), and the current national anthem of Turkmenistan. He was awarded the title of People's Artist of the USSR in 1965, the Stalin Prize in 1951 and 1952, and the Order of Lenin twice. He was also twice a member of the Supreme Soviet.

== Biography ==
Muhadow studied music from 1929 to 1933 at a boarding school in Ashgabat. Beginning in 1936 he began studies in the Turkmen Department of the Moscow Conservatory. His most prominent works include the opera "End of the Bloody Watershed", the symphonic poem "My Homeland", the symphony "In Memory of Magtymguly", and his 1944 composition of the national anthem of the Turkmen Soviet Socialist Republic.

Muhadow's studies were interrupted in 1941 by the outbreak of World War II in the Soviet Union. Muhadow returned to Ashgabat and joined the Red Army, assigned to the 99th Rifle Division, which saw combat in the Don River basin. He was demobilized in 1943 and returned to Ashgabat to the position of choir director of the Opera and Ballet Theater. This period was marked by composition of a series of patriotic songs. After the war, Muhadow collaborated with Russian composer Adrian Shaposhnikov to compose the comic opera "Kemine and Kazy". In 1946 he returned to the Moscow Conservatory to resume study of composition, and during this period wrote "Cantata on the Communist Party" and "Turkmen Suite". This last work earned him the USSR State Prize in 1951. Muhadow's dissertation composition was the symphonic poem "My Homeland".

Over Muhadow's career, he composed over 200 songs, including "Parahatlyk uçin" ("For Peace"), "Nebitçiniň aýdymy" ("Song of the Oilworker"), "Garagumyň gülleri bar" ("Karakum Blooms"), and "Lenin hakynda aýdym" ("Song About Lenin").

Beginning in 1951 he served as a member of the board of directors of the USSR Composers Union, and additional periodically served as a member of the committees for award of the Lenin Prize and USSR State Prize, deputy chair of the Turkmen SSR State Prize committee, and board member of the USSR-Indonesia Society. He was a deputy of the fourth and fifth sessions of the Supreme Soviet of the USSR.

== Awards ==
- For Valorous Labor (1946)
- For Victory over Germany in the Great Patriotic War (1946)
- Badge of Honor (1950)
- State Prize of the USSR (1951, 1952)
- Order of Lenin (1955)
- People's Artist of the USSR (1965)
- Order of the Red Banner of Labor (1967)
- Magtymguly State Prize of the Turkmen SSR (1972)
- Order of Friendship of Peoples (1976)
