= Surudi Milli =

National anthem of Tajikistan

Surudi Millī
English: 'National Anthem'
- Суруди Миллӣ
- Sheet music
- National anthem of Tajikistan
- Also known as: Суруди миллии Ҷумҳурии Тоҷикистон (English: National Anthem of the Republic of Tajikistan)
- Lyrics: Gulnazar Keldiy
- Music: Sulaymon Yudakov, 1946
- Adopted: 7 September 1994
- Preceded by: State Anthem of the Tajik Soviet Socialist Republic

Audio sample
- Classic vocal recording in A minor: file; help

U.S. Navy Band instrumental version in A-sharp minor

The national anthem of the Republic of Tajikistan (Note: Tajik: Суруди миллии Ҷумҳурии Тоҷикистон, romanized: Surudi milliyi jumhuriyi Tojikiston, pronounced [sʊˈrudɪ mɪlˈlijɪ ˌdʒʊmɦuˈrijɪ tɔˌdʒikɪˈstɔn]) was officially adopted by the Constitution of Tajikistan on 7 September 1994, two days before Independence Day. During this time, in the midst of the Tajikistani Civil War, new lyrics were penned by Gulnazar Keldi to reflect the country's independence from the Soviet Union and the country's status as a sovereign state. The melody, however, remains exactly the same as that of the anthem of the Tajik Soviet Socialist Republic, composed by Sulaymon Yudakov in 1946. The national anthem of Tajikistan is one of the country's official state symbols, along with its flag and coat of arms.

== History ==
Upon the country's independence from the Soviet Union in 1991, Tajikistan retained the Soviet-era regional anthem, lyrics and all, as its national anthem for a time before replacing the lyrics in 1994. This was in contrast to other former Soviet states like Kazakhstan (until 2006), Russia (since 2000) and Uzbekistan that appropriated their old Soviet-era regional anthems as national ones but did so without the Soviet-era lyrics.

== Lyrics ==
=== Tajik original ===
Cyrillic alphabet

Диёри арҷманди мо,
Ба бахти мо сари азизи ту баланд бод,
Саодати ту, давлати ту бегазанд бод.
Зи дурии замонаҳо расидаем,
Ба зери парчами ту саф кашидаем, кашидаем.

Зинда бош, эй Ватан,
Тоҷикистони озоди ман!

Барои ному нанги мо
Ту аз умеди рафтагони мо нишонаӣ,
Ту баҳри ворисон ҷаҳони ҷовидонаӣ,
Хазон намерасад ба навбаҳори ту,
Ки мазраи вафо бувад канори ту, канори ту.

Зинда бош, эй Ватан,
Тоҷикистони озоди ман!

Ту модари ягонаӣ,
Бақои ту бувад бақои хонадони мо,
Мароми ту бувад мароми ҷисму ҷони мо,
Зи ту саодати абад насиби мост,
Ту ҳастиву ҳама ҷаҳон ҳабиби мост, ҳабиби мост.

Зинда бош, эй Ватан,
Тоҷикистони озоди ман!

Persian alphabet

،دیار ارجمند ما
،به بخت ما سر عزیز تو بلند باد
.سعادت تو، دولت تو بی‌گزند باد
،ز دوری زمانه‌ها رسیده‌ایم
.به زیر پرچم تو صف کشیده‌ایم، کشیده‌ایم

،زنده باش، ای وطن
!تاجیکستان آزاد من

برای نام و ننگ ما
،تو از امید رفتگان ما نشانه‌ای
،تو بهر وارثان جهان جاودانه‌ای
،خزان نمی‌رسد به نوبهار تو
.که مزرع وفا بود کنار تو، کنار تو

،زنده باش، ای وطن
!تاجیکستان آزاد من

،تو مادر یگانه‌ای
،بقای تو بود بقای خاندان ما
،مرام تو بود مرام جسم و جان ما
،ز تو سعادت ابد نصیب ماست
.تو هستی و همه جهان حبیب ماست، حبیب ماست

،زنده باش، ای وطن
!تاجیکستان آزاد من

Bukhori alphabet

דיאר ארג׳מנד מא
בה בכת מא סר עזיז תו בלנד באד
סעאדת תו, דולת תו ביגזנד באד
ז דורי זמאנההא רסידהאם
בה זיר פרג׳ם תו צפ כשידהאם, כשידהאם

זנדה באש, אי וטן
תאג׳יכסתאן אזאד מן

בראי נאם וננגי מא
תו אז אמיד רפתגאנ תו נשאנהאי
תו בהר וארתאן ג׳האן ג׳אודאנהאי
כזאן נמירסד בה נובהאר תו
כה מזרע ופא בוד כנאר תו, כנאר תו

זנדה באש, אי וטן
תאג׳יכסתאן אזאד מן

תו מאדר יגאנהאי
בקאי תו בוד בקאי כאנדאנ מא
מראם תו בוד מראם ג׳סם וג׳אן מא
ז תו סעאדת אבד נציב מאסת
תו הסתי והמה ג׳האן קביב מאסת, קביב מאסת

זנדה באש, אי וטן
תאג׳יכסתאן אזאד מן

Roman alphabet

Diyori arjmandi mo,
Ba baxti mo sari azizi tu baland bod,
Saodati tu, davlati tu begazand bod.
Zi duriyi zamonaho rasidayem,
Ba zeri parchami tu saf kashidayem, kashidayem.

Zinda bosh, ey Vatan,
Tojikistoni ozodi man!

Baroyi nomu nangi mo
Tu az umedi raftagoni mo nishonaiy,
Tu bahri vorison jahoni jovidonaiy,
Xazon namerasad ba navbahori tu,
Ki mazra’i vafo buvad kanori tu, kanori tu.

Zinda bosh, ey Vatan,
Tojikistoni ozodi man!

Tu modari yagonaiy,
Baqoyi tu buvad baqoyi xonadoni mo,
Maromi tu buvad maromi jismu joni mo,
Zi tu saodati abad nasibi most,
Tu hastivu hama jahon habibi most, habibi most.

Zinda bosh, ey Vatan,
Tojikistoni ozodi man!

IPA transcription (Note: See Help:IPA/Persian, Tajik alphabet and Tajik language § Phonology.)

[dɪˈjɔ.rɪ ɐrdʒˈman.dɪ mɔ |]
[ba ˈbaχ.tɪ mɔ ˈsa.rɪ ʔɐˈzi.zɪ tu bɐˈland bɔd |]
[sɐ.ʔɔˈda.tɪ tu dɐʋˈla.tɪ tu be.gɐˈzand bɔd ‖]
[zɪ duˈrɪ.jɪ zɐˌmɔ.nɐˈɦɔ rɐ.siˈda.jem |]
[ba ˈze.rɪ pɐrˈtʃa.mɪ tu saf 𝄆 kɐ.ʃiˈda.jem 𝄇 ‖]

[zɪnˈda bɔʃ | ʔej ʋɐˈtan |]
[tɔˌdʒi.kɪsˈtɔ.nɪ ʔɔˈzɔ.dɪ man ‖]

[bɐˈrɔ.jɪ ˈnɔ.mʊ ˈnaŋ.gɪ mɔ |]
[tu ʔaz ʔʊˈme.dɪ rɐf.tɐˈgɔ.nɪ mɔ nɪˌʃɔ.nɐˈʔij |]
[tu ˈbɐɦ.rɪ ʋɔ.rɪˈsɔn dʒɐˈɦɔ.nɪ dʒɔ.ʋɪˌdɔ.nɐˈʔij |]
[χɐˈzɔn nɐˌme.rɐˈsad ba nɐʋ.bɐˈɦɔ.rɪ tu |]
[kɪ mɐzˈra.ʔɪ ʋɐˈfɔ bʊˈʋad 𝄆 kɐˈnɔ.rɪ tu 𝄇 ‖]

[zɪnˈda bɔʃ | ʔej ʋɐˈtan |]
[tɔˌdʒi.kɪsˈtɔ.nɪ ʔɔˈzɔ.dɪ man ‖]

[tu mɔˈda.rɪ jɐˌgɔ.nɐˈʔij |]
[bɐˈqɔ.jɪ tu bʊˈʋad bɐˈqɔ.jɪ χɔ.nɐˈdɔ.nɪ mɔ |]
[mɐˈrɔ.mɪ tu bʊˈʋad mɐˈrɔ.mɪ ˈdʒɪs.mʊ ˈdʒɔ.nɪ mɔ |]
[zɪ tu sɐ.ʔɔˈda.tɪ ʔɐˈbad nɐˈsi.bɪ mɔst |]
[tu ɦɐsˈtɪ.ʋʊ ɦɐˈma dʒɐˈɦɔn 𝄆 ɦɐˈbi.bɪ mɔst 𝄇 ‖]

[zɪnˈda bɔʃ | ʔej ʋɐˈtan |]
[tɔˌdʒi.kɪsˈtɔ.nɪ ʔɔˈzɔ.dɪ man ‖]

=== English translation ===
Our beloved country,
Happy we are to see your dignity.
Let your joy and prosperity forever be.
We have reached this day since time immemorial.
Together aligned we stand under your flag, under your flag.

Long live my homeland,
My free Tajikistan!

You are our symbol maternal,
You are the symbol of our honour and dignity,
You are for all your sons and daughters a world eternal,
Never shall your bosom fade away,
We shall continue to remain loyal to you, loyal to you.

Long live my homeland,
My free Tajikistan!

You are a mother for all of us,
Your destiny is the future for our families,
Your meaning is the essence of our souls and bodies,
You give us amaranthine happiness,
Because of you, Tajikistan, we love the world – love the world.

Long live my homeland,
My free Tajikistan!
