= Marche Henri IV =

French patriotic song and historical anthem

Vive Henri IV
English: Long live Henry IV
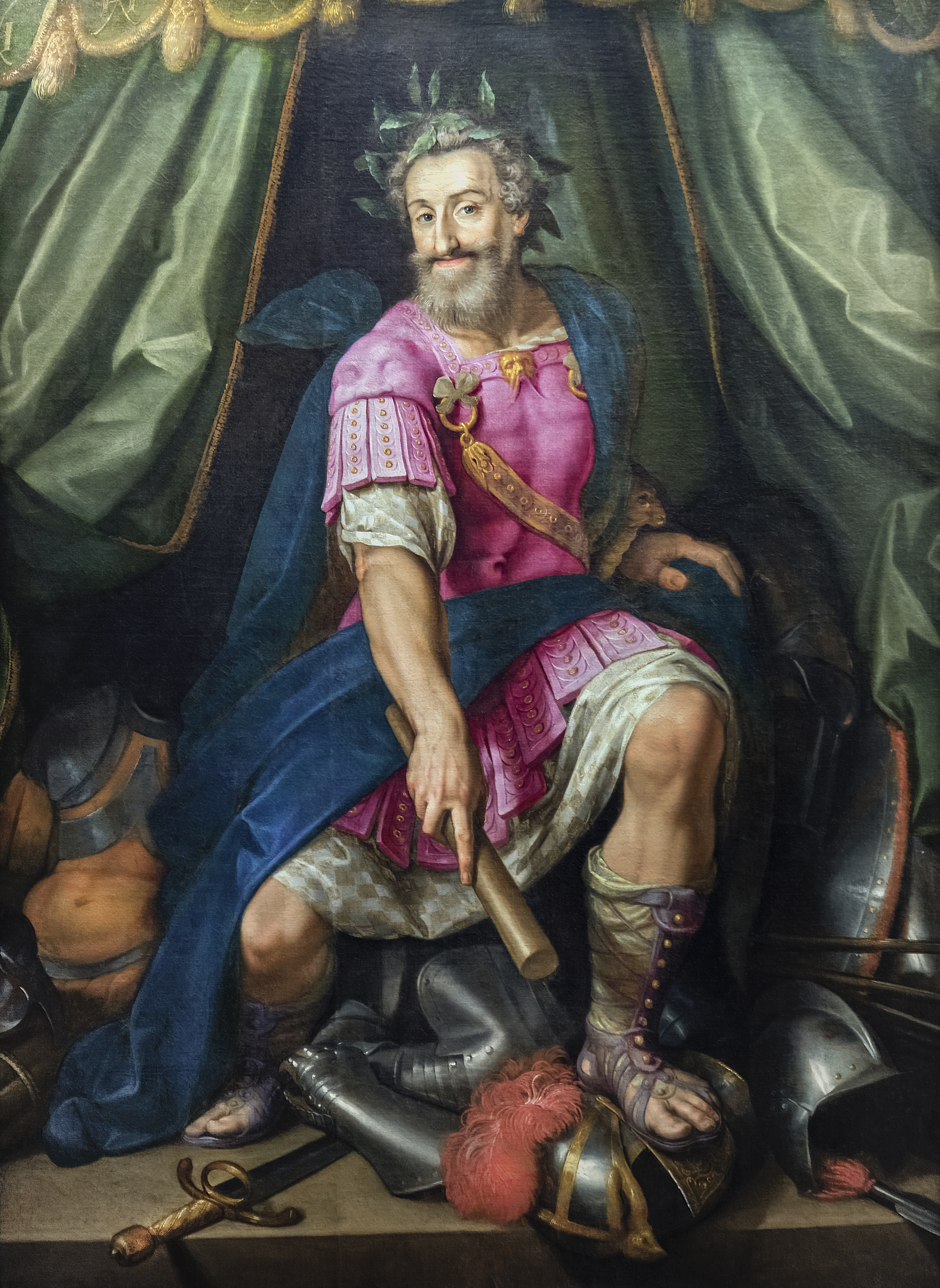
- Henry IV of France
- De facto National and Royal anthem of Kingdom of France
- Adopted: 1590
- Readopted: 1814
- Relinquished: 1792, 1830
- Succeeded by: "Chant de guerre pour l'Armée du Rhin" (1792); "La Parisienne" (1830)

Audio sample
- Digital instrumental rendition in D minor: file; help

"Marche Henri IV", alternatively "Vive Henri IV" or "Vive le roi Henri", is a popular French song celebrating King Henry IV of France (also known as Le Bon Roi Henri, "Good King Henry"). The melody was heard of as early as 1581, when it was mentioned in the book of Christmas songs of Christophle de Bordeaux, under the name "Chant de la Cassandre". It was a de facto anthem of the Kingdom of France in the period after the Bourbon Restoration (the kingdom did not have an official anthem).

Thoinot Arbeau, in his Orchesographie (1589), gives us a music score of the air as the "Branle Couppé Cassandre". The air was adapted around 1600, presumably by Eustache du Caurroy, to fit new lyrics celebrating the then King of France. Three other verses were written for a comedy opera by Charles Collé in 1770, called La partie de chasse de Henri IV. At later dates, more lyrics were added to the song. The song refers to the first Bourbon King of France, Henry IV (Henry III of Navarre), who had ended the Wars of Religion and restored peace to France (hence his sobriquet).

During the French Revolution, the original lyrics were used to support the royalist cause. For instance, during the early Revolution, before the turn to republicanism (1789–1791), the anthem was renamed "Vive Louis XVI" ("Long live Louis XVI"). The lyrics were used by constitutional monarchists to give praise to the monarchy during times of political crisis.

The anthem was also used with yet another set of lyrics during the Bourbon Restoration period (1814–1830), under the name "Le Retour des Princes français à Paris".

== Lyrics ==
French original

I
Vive Henri quatre
Vive ce Roi vaillant
Ce diable à quatre
A le triple talent :
De boire et de battre,
Et d'être un vert galant.
De boire et de battre,
Et d'être un vert galant.

II
Au diable guerres,
Rancunes et partis !
Comme nos pères
Chantons en vrais amis,
Au choc des verres,
Les roses et les lys.
Au choc des verres,
Les roses et les lys.

III
Chantons l'antienne
Qu'on chantera dans mille ans;
Que Dieu maintienne
En paix ses descendants
Jusqu'à ce qu'on prenne,
La Lune avec les dents.
Jusqu'à ce qu'on prenne,
La Lune avec les dents.

IV
Vive la France !
Vive le roi Henri !
Qu'à Reims on danse
En disant comme Paris :
Vive la France !
Vive le roi Henri !
Vive la France !
Vive le roi Henri !

English translation

I
Long live Henry IV
Long live this valiant king
This fourfold devil
Of three talents:
Of drinking, fighting
And womanising.
Of drinking, fighting
And womanising.

II
To hell with wars,
Grudges and partisanship!
Like our fathers
Let us sing as true friends,
Clink the glasses,
The roses and the lilies.
Clink the glasses,
The roses and the lilies.

III
Let's sing the refrain
That we will sing in a thousand years:
May God maintain
His descendants in peace
Until we take the moon
With our teeth.
Until we take the moon
With our teeth.

IV
Long live France!
Long live king Henry!
May there be dancing in Reims,
Saying along with Paris:
"Long live France!
Long live king Henry!
Long live France!
Long live king Henry!"

== In other works ==
- Marche Henri IV was a common leitmotif for French royalty in several 19th-century works, such as in Gioachino Rossini's opera Il viaggio a Reims (in the finale, when Charles X is crowned) and in the final march in Pyotr Ilyich Tchaikovsky's ballet The Sleeping Beauty (and the same march is recalled in the final scene of Sleeping Beauty by Walt Disney, since it includes arrangements and adaptations from the ballet).
- It was set for piano solo by Franz Liszt in c. 1870–1880 (S. 239).
- It is mentioned as one of the tunes played in Russia after the defeat of Napoleon in The Blizzard by Alexander Pushkin.
- The anthem is mentioned in Leo Tolstoy's novel War and Peace, and actually performed by French prisoners in the Russian film production of the same name.
- In the novel Les Misérables, Victor Hugo has the character Grantaire sing alternative Dionysian lyrics to the tune to rile his fellow student insurrectionists.
- It is used in the soundtrack for the television series Turn: Washington's Spies, when introducing a scene involving French military forces at Battle of Yorktown (season 4, episode 9).

== See also ==
- Richard Coeur-de-lion (opera) § The work and its influence ("Ô Richard, ô mon roi")
- "Où peut-on être mieux qu’au sein de sa famille ?"
- "La Marseillaise"
