= Alphonse Varney =

French conductor

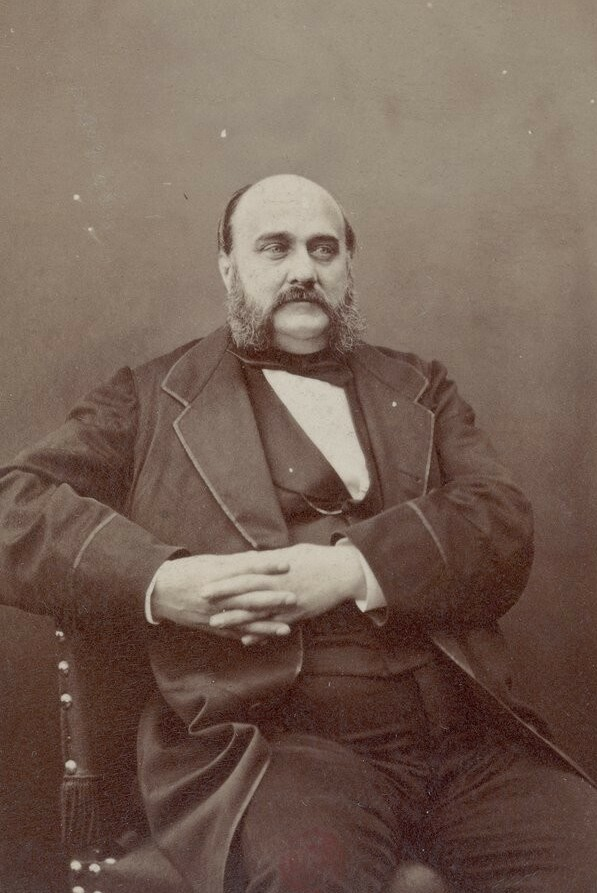
Image of Alphonse Varney

Alphonse Varney (French: [vaʁnɛ]; 1 December 1811 – 7 February 1879) was a French conductor, mainly of opera. His son was the composer Louis Varney who studied music with his father.

== Education ==
He studied at the Paris Conservatoire including counterpoint with Reicha.

== Career ==
Varney conducted the Théâtre de Ghent in 1835, followed by the Théâtre Historique, the Théâtre Lyrique (which he left in 1852 to spend more time composing, and conducting in Ghent), the Théâtre des Bouffes Parisiens from 1857 (from 1862 to 1864 he was also director and staged works by Offenbach), the Grand Théâtre de Bordeaux from 1865 to 1878, and the Société Sainte-Cecile in Bordeaux. He was also invited to conduct the 'French Opera Season' in New Orleans in 1844.

== Compositions ==
Varney composed the well-known Chant des Girondins, written for the play Le Chevalier de Maison-Rouge by Alexandre Dumas. He also composed the music for a drame-lyrique by Alexandre Dumas, fils in 1848 entitled Atala. His opéra comique La ferme de Kilmoor (first performance 27 October 1852 at the Théâtre-Lyrique) was savaged by the critics. Other stage works by Varney include Le moulin joli (1849), L'opéra au camp (1854), La polka des sabots (1859) and Un leçon d'amour (1868).

He retired in 1878.
