= Le Chant des Girondins =

Anthem of the Second French Republic (1848–1852)

English: 'The Chant of the Girondins'
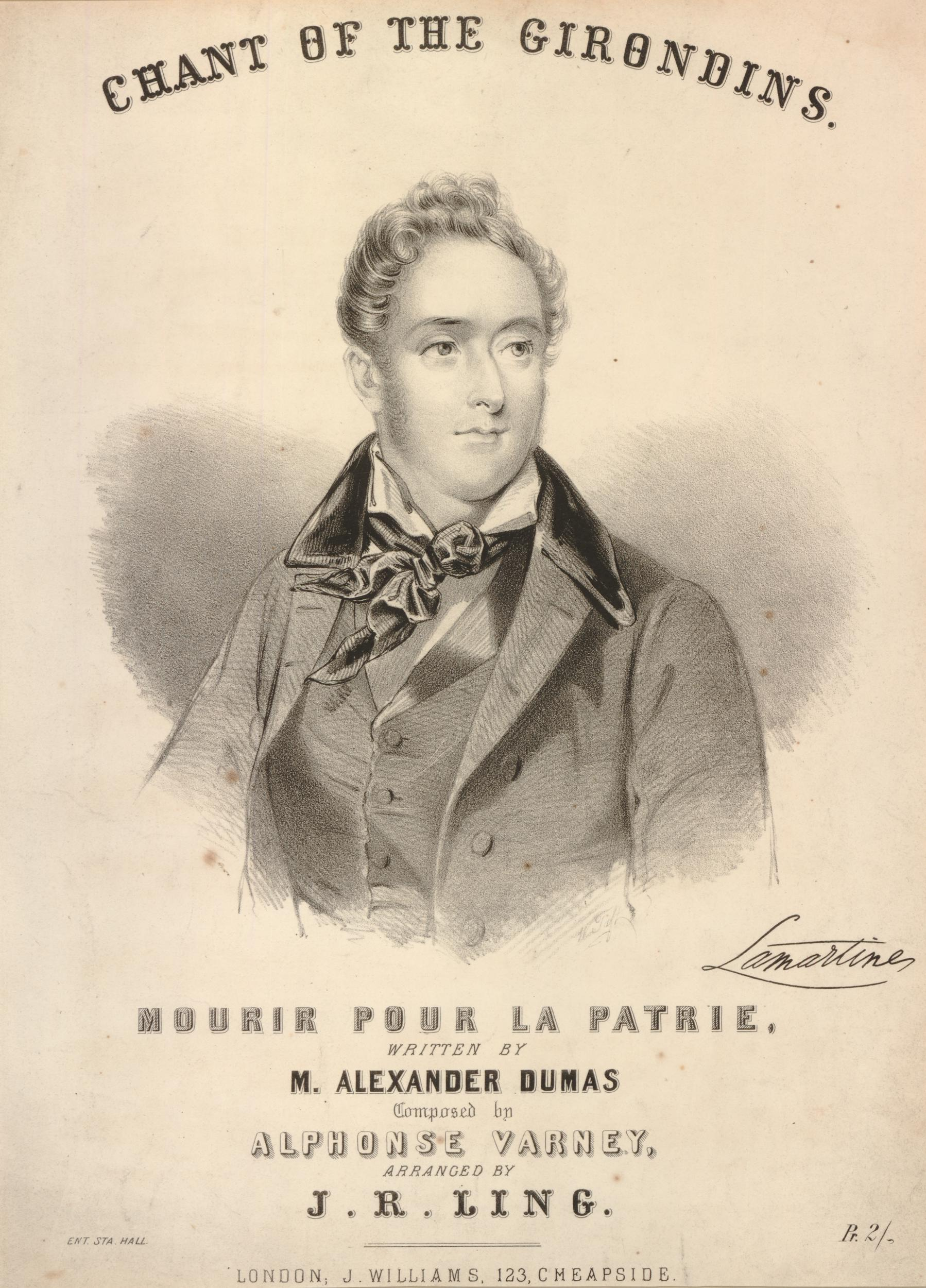
- Music cover to "Chant of the Girondins", featuring Lamartine
- Former national anthem of France
- Lyrics: Alexandre Dumas; Auguste Maquet; Claude-Joseph Rouget de Lisle
- Music: Alphonse Varney
- Adopted: 1848
- Relinquished: 1852
- Preceded by: "La Parisienne"
- Succeeded by: "Partant pour la Syrie"

Audio sample
- file; help

"Le Chant des Girondins" ('The Chant of the Girondins') was the national anthem of the French Second Republic, written for the drama Le Chevalier de Maison-Rouge by the writer Alexandre Dumas with Auguste Maquet. The lines of the refrain were borrowed from "Roland à Roncevaux", a song written in Strasbourg by Claude-Joseph Rouget de Lisle, the author of "La Marseillaise". The music is by conductor-composer Alphonse Varney.

== Lyrics ==
French original

I
Par la voix du canon d’alarmes
La France appelle ses enfants,
– Allons dit le soldat, aux armes !
C’est ma mère, je la défends.

Refrain :
Mourir pour la Patrie
Mourir pour la Patrie
C’est le sort le plus beau, le plus digne d’envie
C’est le sort le plus beau, le plus digne d’envie

II
Nous, amis, qui loin des batailles
Succombons dans l’obscurité,
Vouons du moins nos funérailles
A la France, à la liberté.

Refrain

III
Frères, pour une cause sainte,
Quand chacun de nous est martyr,
Ne proférons pas une plainte,
La France, un jour doit nous bénir.

Refrain

IV
Du Créateur de la nature,
Bénissons encore la bonté,
Nous plaindre serait une injure,
Nous mourons pour la liberté.

Refrain

English translation

I
By the voice of the alarm gun
France calleth her children,
– "Come," said the soldier, to arms!
It's my mother, her do I defend.

Refrain:
Dying for the Homeland
Dying for the Homeland
It's the most beautiful, most desirable fate
It's the most beautiful, most desirable fate

II
We friends who far from battles
Succumbing in the darkness,
Let us at least take our funeral
To France, to freedom.

Refrain

III
Brothers, for a holy cause,
When each of us is martyred,
Make not a complaint,
France, one day ought to bless us.

Refrain

IV
From the Creator of Nature,
Let us bless the goodness still,
Complaining would an insult be,
For freedom we die.

Refrain

== External sources ==
- Music Sheet (Page 1) (in French)
- Music Sheet (Page 2) (in French)
