= La Parisienne (song) =

Former anthem of France

English: 'The Parisian'
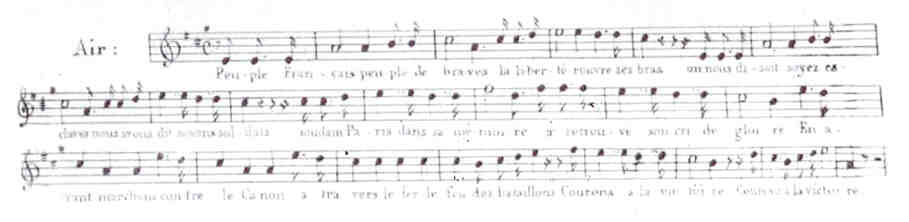
- Tune of La Parisienne.
- Historical anthem of the Kingdom of France
- Lyrics: Casimir Delavigne
- Music: Daniel Auber
- Adopted: 1830
- Relinquished: 1848 (as national anthem)
- Preceded by: "Le Retour des Princes français à Paris"
- Succeeded by: "Le Chant des Girondins"

Audio sample
- Digital instrumental rendition in A major: file; help

"La Parisienne" (pronounced [la paʁizjɛn]; lit. 'The Parisian') is a French patriotic song by Casimir Delavigne. It was composed after the July Revolution and in homage to it and served as the French national anthem during the July Monarchy (1830–1848).

It is sung to the tune of "Ein Schifflein sah Ich Fahren", a German military march, and was harmonized by Daniel Auber.

== Lyrics ==
French original

I
Peuple Français, peuple de braves,
La Liberté rouvre ses bras;
On nous disait : soyez esclaves !
Nous avons dit : soyons soldats !
Soudain Paris, dans sa mémoire
A retrouvé son cri de gloire :

Refrain :
𝄆 En avant, marchons
Contre les canons;
À travers le fer, le feu des bataillons,
Courons à la victoire. 𝄇

II
Serrez vos rangs, qu'on se soutienne !
Marchons ! chaque enfant de Paris
De sa cartouche citoyenne
Fait une offrande à son pays;
Ô jour d'éternelle mémoire !
Paris n'a plus qu'un cri de gloire :

Refrain

III
La mitraille en vain nous dévore,
Elle enfante des combattants;
Sous les boulets voyez éclore
Ces vieux généraux de vingt ans.
Ô jour d'éternelle mémoire !
Paris n'a plus qu'un cri de gloire :

Refrain

IV
Pour briser leurs masses profondes,
Qui conduit nos drapeaux sanglants ?
C'est la liberté des deux Mondes, (Note: This line refers to the role played by Gilbert du Motier de La Fayette in the American Revolutionary War and the French Revolution.)
C'est Lafayette en cheveux blancs.
Ô jour d'éternelle mémoire !
Paris n'a plus qu'un cri de gloire :

Refrain

V
Les trois couleurs sont revenus,
Et la colonne, avec fierté,
Fait briller à travers les nues
L'arc-en-ciel de sa liberté,
Ô jour d'éternelle mémoire !
Paris n'a plus qu'un cri de gloire :

Refrain

VI
Soldat du drapeau tricolore,
D'Orléans ! roi qui l'a porté,
Ton sang se mêlerait encore
À celui qu'il nous a couté.
Ô jour d'éternelle mémoire !
Paris n'a plus qu'un cri de gloire :

Refrain

VII
Tambours, du convoi de nos frères,
Roulez le funèbre signal;
Et nous, de lauriers populaires
Chargeons leur cercueil triomphal.
Ô temple de deuil et de gloire !
Panthéon, reçois leur mémoire !

Refrain :
𝄆 Portons-les marchons
Découvrons nos fronts
Soyez immortels vous tous que nous pleurons,
Martyrs de la victoire. 𝄇

English translation

I
O French people, people of heroes,
Freedom reopens its arms;
We were told, "be slaves!"
We said, "be soldiers!"
Suddenly Paris in its memory
Has found its cry of glory:

Refrain:
𝄆 Forward, let's march
Against the cannons;
Across the iron, the fire of battalions,
Let's hurry to victory. 𝄇

II
Close thy ranks, let's support each other!
Let's march! each son of Paris
From his civic cartouche
Maketh an offering to his country;
O day of eternal memory!
Paris hath just one cry of glory left:

Refrain

III
The grapeshot devoureth us in vain,
It giveth birth to fighters;
See these twenty-year-old generals
Hatch under the bullets.
O day of eternal memory!
Paris hath just one cry of glory left:

Refrain

IV
To break their profound masses,
Who leadeth our bloody flags?
'Tis the freedom of two Worlds,
'Tis Lafayette in white hair.
O day of eternal memory!
Paris hath just one cry of glory left:

Refrain

V
The three colours have returned,
And the column, with pride,
Shineth through the clouds
The rainbow of its freedom,
O day of eternal memory!
Paris hath just one cry of glory left:

Refrain

VI
O soldier of the tricolour flag
Of Orleans! O king who carried it,
Thy blood would still mingle
With that which it cost us.
O day of eternal memory!
Paris hath just one cry of glory left:

Refrain

VII
Drums of the convoy of our brothers,
Roll the funeral signal;
And we, with popular laurels
Load their triumphant coffin.
O temple of mourning and glory!
Pantheon, receive their memory!

Refrain :
𝄆 Let's carry them and march
Let's uncover our foreheads
Be immortal, all of ye whom we mourn,
Martyrs of victory. 𝄇

== See also ==
- Casimir Delavigne
- July Revolution
