= Le Retour des Princes français à Paris =

Historical French national anthem

English: The Return of the French Princes to Paris
- de facto national anthem of Kingdom of France
- Music: Melody from Marche Henri IV
- Preceded by: Chant du départ
- Succeeded by: La Parisienne

Audio sample
- Le Retour des Princes français à Paris (instrumental, piano): file; help

"Le Retour des Princes français à Paris" ("The Return of the French Princes to Paris") was the de facto national anthem of France during the Bourbon Restoration. It used the melody of the then popular marching tune Vive Henri IV.

== Lyrics ==
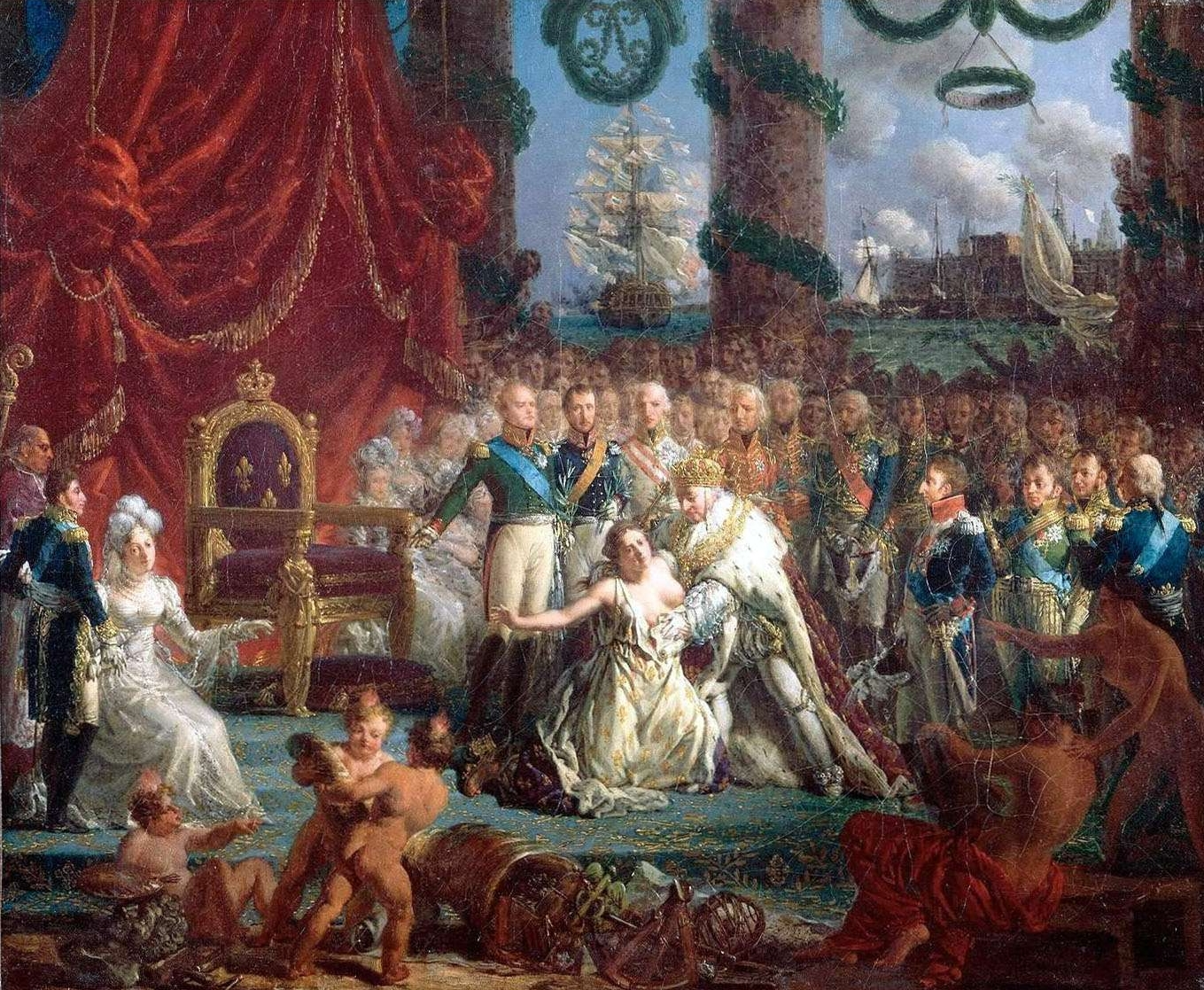
Louis XVIII lifts France from her ruin, 1814 allegorical painting by Louis-Philippe Crépin

French lyrics
English translation

1. La paix ramène
Tous les Princes Français
Chantons l’antienne,
Aujourd’hui désormais
Que ce bonheur tienne
Vive le Roi! Vive la Paix!

1. Peace returns
All French Princes
Sing the refrain,
Today and henceforth
May this happiness last
Long live the King! Long live Peace!

2. Vive la France
Et les sages Bourbons
Plein de clémence,
Dont tous les cœurs sont bons!
La Paix, l’abondance
Viendront dans nos cantons.

2. Long live France
And the wise Bourbons
Full of clemency,
Whose hearts are all good!
Peace, abundance
Come in our cantons.

3. Quelle joie extrême
Vive, vive d’Artois!
Duc d’Angoulême!
Chantons tous à la fois
Louis dix-huitième,
Descendant de nos rois!

3. What extreme joy
Live, live, Artois!
Duke of Angoulême!
Let us sing again
Louis the eighteenth
Descendant of our kings!

4. Le diadème
De France est pour un Roi,
Notre vœu même
Est la raison pourquoi,
Oui, Louis nous aime,
Vive, vive le Roi!

4. The diadem
Of France is for a king
Our very wish
Is the reason why,
Yes, Louis loves us,
Long live the King!

5. Plus de tristesse,
Vive, vive Louis!
Princes, princesses,
Nous sommes réjouis,
Que les allégresses
Règnent dans tous pays!

5. No more sadness,
Long live Louis!
Princes, princesses,
We are delighted,
That joys
Prevail in all the lands!

== See also ==
- Marche Henri IV
- La Marseillaise
