= List of municipalities in Maranhão =

This is a list of the municipalities in the state of Maranhão (MA), located in the Northeast Region of Brazil. Maranhão is divided into 217 municipalities, which are grouped into 21 microregions, which are grouped into 5 mesoregions.

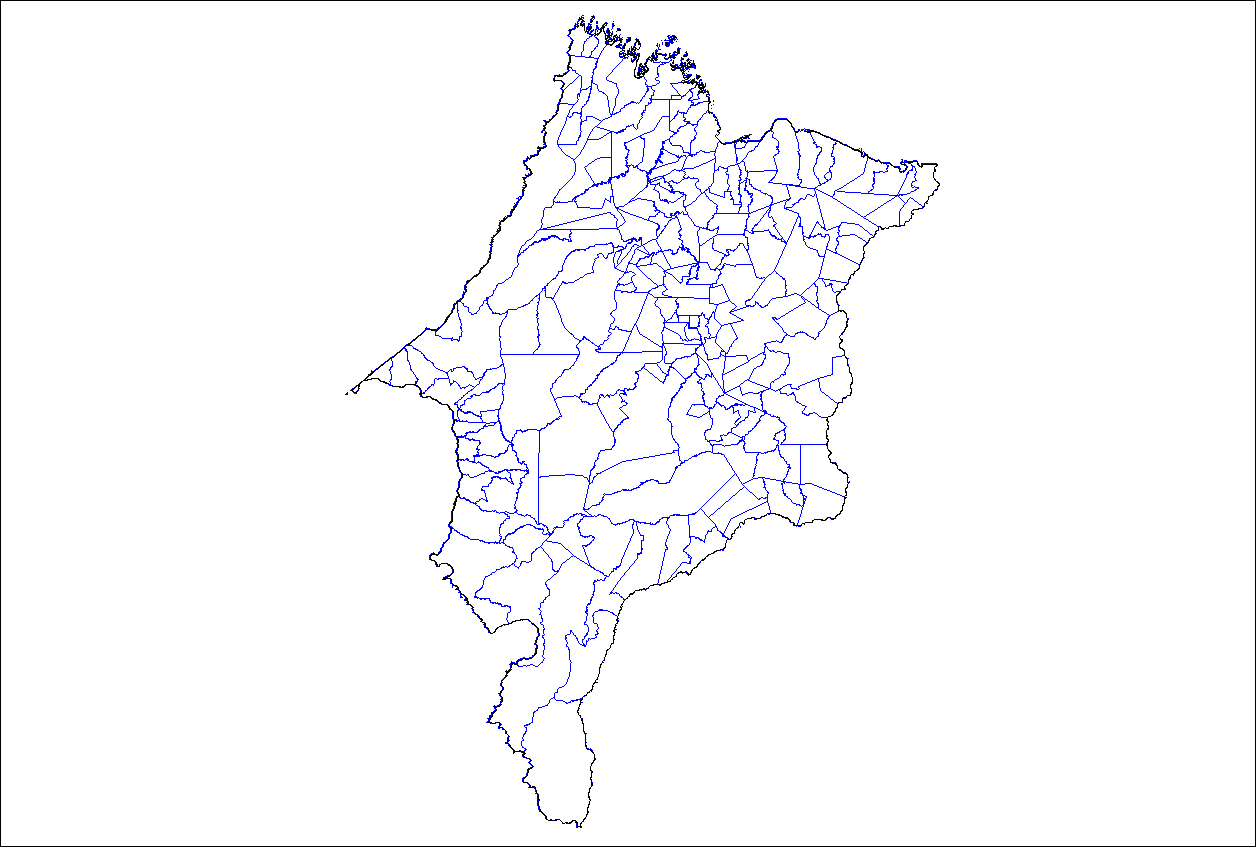
Municipalities of Maranhao, Brazil

Mesoregion	Microregion	Municipality
Centro Maranhense	Alto Mearim e Grajaú	Arame
Centro Maranhense	Alto Mearim e Grajaú	Barra do Corda
Centro Maranhense	Alto Mearim e Grajaú	Fernando Falcão
Centro Maranhense	Alto Mearim e Grajaú	Formosa da Serra Negra
Centro Maranhense	Alto Mearim e Grajaú	Grajaú
Centro Maranhense	Alto Mearim e Grajaú	Itaipava do Grajaú
Centro Maranhense	Alto Mearim e Grajaú	Jenipapo dos Vieiras
Centro Maranhense	Alto Mearim e Grajaú	Joselândia
Centro Maranhense	Alto Mearim e Grajaú	Santa Filomena do Maranhão
Centro Maranhense	Alto Mearim e Grajaú	Sítio Novo
Centro Maranhense	Alto Mearim e Grajaú	Tuntum
Centro Maranhense	Médio Mearim	Bacabal
Centro Maranhense	Médio Mearim	Bernardo do Mearim
Centro Maranhense	Médio Mearim	Bom Lugar
Centro Maranhense	Médio Mearim	Esperantinópolis
Centro Maranhense	Médio Mearim	Igarapé Grande
Centro Maranhense	Médio Mearim	Lago do Junco
Centro Maranhense	Médio Mearim	Lago dos Rodrigues
Centro Maranhense	Médio Mearim	Lago Verde
Centro Maranhense	Médio Mearim	Lima Campos
Centro Maranhense	Médio Mearim	Olho d'Água das Cunhãs
Centro Maranhense	Médio Mearim	Pedreiras
Centro Maranhense	Médio Mearim	Pio XII
Centro Maranhense	Médio Mearim	Poção de Pedras
Centro Maranhense	Médio Mearim	Santo Antônio dos Lopes
Centro Maranhense	Médio Mearim	São Luís Gonzaga do Maranhão
Centro Maranhense	Médio Mearim	São Mateus do Maranhão
Centro Maranhense	Médio Mearim	São Raimundo do Doca Bezerra
Centro Maranhense	Médio Mearim	São Roberto
Centro Maranhense	Médio Mearim	Satubinha
Centro Maranhense	Médio Mearim	Trizidela do Vale
Centro Maranhense	Presidente Dutra	Dom Pedro
Centro Maranhense	Presidente Dutra	Fortuna
Centro Maranhense	Presidente Dutra	Gonçalves Dias
Centro Maranhense	Presidente Dutra	Governador Archer
Centro Maranhense	Presidente Dutra	Governador Eugênio Barros
Centro Maranhense	Presidente Dutra	Governador Luiz Rocha
Centro Maranhense	Presidente Dutra	Graça Aranha
Centro Maranhense	Presidente Dutra	Presidente Dutra
Centro Maranhense	Presidente Dutra	Senador Alexandre Costa
Centro Maranhense	Presidente Dutra	São Domingos do Maranhão
Centro Maranhense	Presidente Dutra	São José dos Basílios
Leste Maranhense	Baixo Parnaíba Maranhense	Água Doce do Maranhão
Leste Maranhense	Baixo Parnaíba Maranhense	Araioses
Leste Maranhense	Baixo Parnaíba Maranhense	Magalhães de Almeida
Leste Maranhense	Baixo Parnaíba Maranhense	Santa Quitéria do Maranhão
Leste Maranhense	Baixo Parnaíba Maranhense	Santana do Maranhão
Leste Maranhense	Baixo Parnaíba Maranhense	São Bernardo
Leste Maranhense	Caxias	Buriti Bravo
Leste Maranhense	Caxias	Caxias
Leste Maranhense	Caxias	Matões
Leste Maranhense	Caxias	Parnarama
Leste Maranhense	Caxias	São João do Soter
Leste Maranhense	Caxias	Timon
Leste Maranhense	Chapadas do Alto Itapecuru	Barão de Grajaú
Leste Maranhense	Chapadas do Alto Itapecuru	Colinas
Leste Maranhense	Chapadas do Alto Itapecuru	Jatobá
Leste Maranhense	Chapadas do Alto Itapecuru	Lagoa do Mato
Leste Maranhense	Chapadas do Alto Itapecuru	Mirador
Leste Maranhense	Chapadas do Alto Itapecuru	Nova Iorque
Leste Maranhense	Chapadas do Alto Itapecuru	Paraibano
Leste Maranhense	Chapadas do Alto Itapecuru	Passagem Franca
Leste Maranhense	Chapadas do Alto Itapecuru	Pastos Bons
Leste Maranhense	Chapadas do Alto Itapecuru	São Francisco do Maranhão
Leste Maranhense	Chapadas do Alto Itapecuru	São João dos Patos
Leste Maranhense	Chapadas do Alto Itapecuru	Sucupira do Norte
Leste Maranhense	Chapadas do Alto Itapecuru	Sucupira do Riachão
Leste Maranhense	Chapadinha	Anapurus
Leste Maranhense	Chapadinha	Belágua
Leste Maranhense	Chapadinha	Brejo
Leste Maranhense	Chapadinha	Buriti
Leste Maranhense	Chapadinha	Chapadinha
Leste Maranhense	Chapadinha	Mata Roma
Leste Maranhense	Chapadinha	Milagres do Maranhão
Leste Maranhense	Chapadinha	São Benedito do Rio Preto
Leste Maranhense	Chapadinha	Urbano Santos
Leste Maranhense	Codó	Alto Alegre do Maranhão
Leste Maranhense	Codó	Capinzal do Norte
Leste Maranhense	Codó	Codó
Leste Maranhense	Codó	Coroatá
Leste Maranhense	Codó	Peritoró
Leste Maranhense	Codó	Timbiras
Leste Maranhense	Coelho Neto	Afonso Cunha
Leste Maranhense	Coelho Neto	Aldeias Altas
Leste Maranhense	Coelho Neto	Coelho Neto
Leste Maranhense	Coelho Neto	Duque Bacelar
Norte Maranhense	Aglomeração Urbana de São Luís	Paço do Lumiar
Norte Maranhense	Aglomeração Urbana de São Luís	Raposa
Norte Maranhense	Aglomeração Urbana de São Luís	São José de Ribamar
Norte Maranhense	Aglomeração Urbana de São Luís	São Luís (state capital)
Norte Maranhense	Baixada Maranhense	Anajatuba
Norte Maranhense	Baixada Maranhense	Arari
Norte Maranhense	Baixada Maranhense	Bela Vista do Maranhão
Norte Maranhense	Baixada Maranhense	Cajari
Norte Maranhense	Baixada Maranhense	Conceição do Lago-Açu
Norte Maranhense	Baixada Maranhense	Igarapé do Meio
Norte Maranhense	Baixada Maranhense	Matinha
Norte Maranhense	Baixada Maranhense	Monção
Norte Maranhense	Baixada Maranhense	Olinda Nova do Maranhão
Norte Maranhense	Baixada Maranhense	Palmeirândia
Norte Maranhense	Baixada Maranhense	Pedro do Rosário
Norte Maranhense	Baixada Maranhense	Penalva
Norte Maranhense	Baixada Maranhense	Peri Mirim
Norte Maranhense	Baixada Maranhense	Pinheiro
Norte Maranhense	Baixada Maranhense	Presidente Sarney
Norte Maranhense	Baixada Maranhense	Santa Helena
Norte Maranhense	Baixada Maranhense	São Bento
Norte Maranhense	Baixada Maranhense	São João Batista
Norte Maranhense	Baixada Maranhense	São Vicente Ferrer
Norte Maranhense	Baixada Maranhense	Viana
Norte Maranhense	Baixada Maranhense	Vitória do Mearim
Norte Maranhense	Itapecuru Mirim	Cantanhede
Norte Maranhense	Itapecuru Mirim	Itapecuru Mirim
Norte Maranhense	Itapecuru Mirim	Matões do Norte
Norte Maranhense	Itapecuru Mirim	Miranda do Norte
Norte Maranhense	Itapecuru Mirim	Nina Rodrigues
Norte Maranhense	Itapecuru Mirim	Pirapemas
Norte Maranhense	Itapecuru Mirim	Presidente Vargas
Norte Maranhense	Itapecuru Mirim	Vargem Grande
Norte Maranhense	Lençois Maranhenses	Barreirinhas
Norte Maranhense	Lençois Maranhenses	Humberto de Campos
Norte Maranhense	Lençois Maranhenses	Paulino Neves
Norte Maranhense	Lençois Maranhenses	Primeira Cruz
Norte Maranhense	Lençois Maranhenses	Santo Amaro do Maranhão
Norte Maranhense	Lençois Maranhenses	Tutóia
Norte Maranhense	Litoral Ocidental Maranhense	Alcântara
Norte Maranhense	Litoral Ocidental Maranhense	Apicum-Açu
Norte Maranhense	Litoral Ocidental Maranhense	Bacuri
Norte Maranhense	Litoral Ocidental Maranhense	Bacurituba
Norte Maranhense	Litoral Ocidental Maranhense	Bequimão
Norte Maranhense	Litoral Ocidental Maranhense	Cajapió
Norte Maranhense	Litoral Ocidental Maranhense	Cedral
Norte Maranhense	Litoral Ocidental Maranhense	Central do Maranhão
Norte Maranhense	Litoral Ocidental Maranhense	Cururupu
Norte Maranhense	Litoral Ocidental Maranhense	Guimarães
Norte Maranhense	Litoral Ocidental Maranhense	Mirinzal
Norte Maranhense	Litoral Ocidental Maranhense	Porto Rico do Maranhão
Norte Maranhense	Litoral Ocidental Maranhense	Serrano do Maranhão
Norte Maranhense	Rosário	Axixá
Norte Maranhense	Rosário	Bacabeira
Norte Maranhense	Rosário	Cachoeira Grande
Norte Maranhense	Rosário	Icatu
Norte Maranhense	Rosário	Morros
Norte Maranhense	Rosário	Presidente Juscelino
Norte Maranhense	Rosário	Rosário
Norte Maranhense	Rosário	Santa Rita
Oeste Maranhense	Gurupi	Amapá do Maranhão
Oeste Maranhense	Gurupi	Boa Vista do Gurupi
Oeste Maranhense	Gurupi	Cândido Mendes
Oeste Maranhense	Gurupi	Carutapera
Oeste Maranhense	Gurupi	Centro do Guilherme
Oeste Maranhense	Gurupi	Centro Novo do Maranhão
Oeste Maranhense	Gurupi	Godofredo Viana
Oeste Maranhense	Gurupi	Governador Nunes Freire
Oeste Maranhense	Gurupi	Junco do Maranhão
Oeste Maranhense	Gurupi	Luís Domingues
Oeste Maranhense	Gurupi	Maracaçumé
Oeste Maranhense	Gurupi	Maranhãozinho
Oeste Maranhense	Gurupi	Turiaçu
Oeste Maranhense	Gurupi	Turilândia
Oeste Maranhense	Imperatriz	Açailândia
Oeste Maranhense	Imperatriz	Amarante do Maranhão
Oeste Maranhense	Imperatriz	Buritirana
Oeste Maranhense	Imperatriz	Cidelândia
Oeste Maranhense	Imperatriz	Davinópolis
Oeste Maranhense	Imperatriz	Governador Edison Lobão
Oeste Maranhense	Imperatriz	Imperatriz
Oeste Maranhense	Imperatriz	Itinga do Maranhão
Oeste Maranhense	Imperatriz	João Lisboa
Oeste Maranhense	Imperatriz	Lajeado Novo
Oeste Maranhense	Imperatriz	Montes Altos
Oeste Maranhense	Imperatriz	Ribamar Fiquene
Oeste Maranhense	Imperatriz	São Francisco do Brejão
Oeste Maranhense	Imperatriz	São Pedro da Água Branca
Oeste Maranhense	Imperatriz	Senador La Rocque
Oeste Maranhense	Imperatriz	Vila Nova dos Martírios
Oeste Maranhense	Pindaré	Altamira do Maranhão
Oeste Maranhense	Pindaré	Alto Alegre do Pindaré
Oeste Maranhense	Pindaré	Araguanã
Oeste Maranhense	Pindaré	Bom Jardim
Oeste Maranhense	Pindaré	Bom Jesus das Selvas
Oeste Maranhense	Pindaré	Brejo de Areia
Oeste Maranhense	Pindaré	Buriticupu
Oeste Maranhense	Pindaré	Governador Newton Bello
Oeste Maranhense	Pindaré	Lagoa Grande do Maranhão
Oeste Maranhense	Pindaré	Lago da Pedra
Oeste Maranhense	Pindaré	Marajá do Sena
Oeste Maranhense	Pindaré	Nova Olinda do Maranhão
Oeste Maranhense	Pindaré	Paulo Ramos
Oeste Maranhense	Pindaré	Pindaré-Mirim
Oeste Maranhense	Pindaré	Presidente Médici
Oeste Maranhense	Pindaré	Santa Inês
Oeste Maranhense	Pindaré	Santa Luzia
Oeste Maranhense	Pindaré	Santa Luzia do Paruá
Oeste Maranhense	Pindaré	São João do Carú
Oeste Maranhense	Pindaré	Tufilândia
Oeste Maranhense	Pindaré	Vitorino Freire
Oeste Maranhense	Pindaré	Zé Doca
Sul Maranhense	Chapadas das Mangabeiras	Benedito Leite
Sul Maranhense	Chapadas das Mangabeiras	Fortaleza dos Nogueiras
Sul Maranhense	Chapadas das Mangabeiras	Loreto
Sul Maranhense	Chapadas das Mangabeiras	Nova Colinas
Sul Maranhense	Chapadas das Mangabeiras	Sambaíba
Sul Maranhense	Chapadas das Mangabeiras	São Domingos do Azeitão
Sul Maranhense	Chapadas das Mangabeiras	São Félix de Balsas
Sul Maranhense	Chapadas das Mangabeiras	São Raimundo das Mangabeiras
Sul Maranhense	Gerais de Balsas	Alto Parnaíba
Sul Maranhense	Gerais de Balsas	Balsas
Sul Maranhense	Gerais de Balsas	Feira Nova do Maranhão
Sul Maranhense	Gerais de Balsas	Riachão
Sul Maranhense	Gerais de Balsas	Tasso Fragoso
Sul Maranhense	Porto Franco	Campestre do Maranhão
Sul Maranhense	Porto Franco	Carolina
Sul Maranhense	Porto Franco	Estreito
Sul Maranhense	Porto Franco	Porto Franco
Sul Maranhense	Porto Franco	São João do Paraíso
Sul Maranhense	Porto Franco	São Pedro dos Crentes

== See also ==
- Geography of Brazil
- List of cities in Brazil
