= São Raimundo do Doca Bezerra =

Coordinates: 5.105°S 45.0769°W

- Municipality
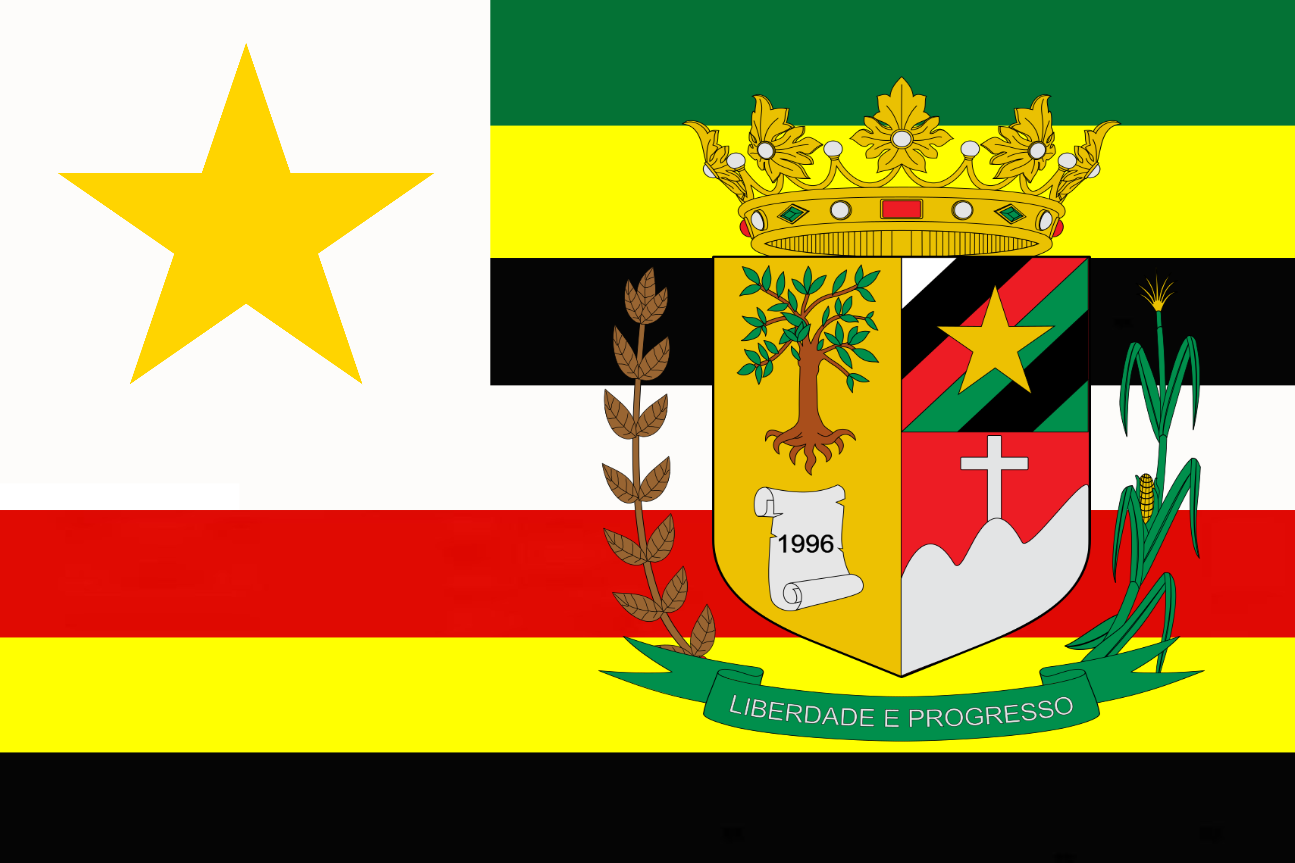
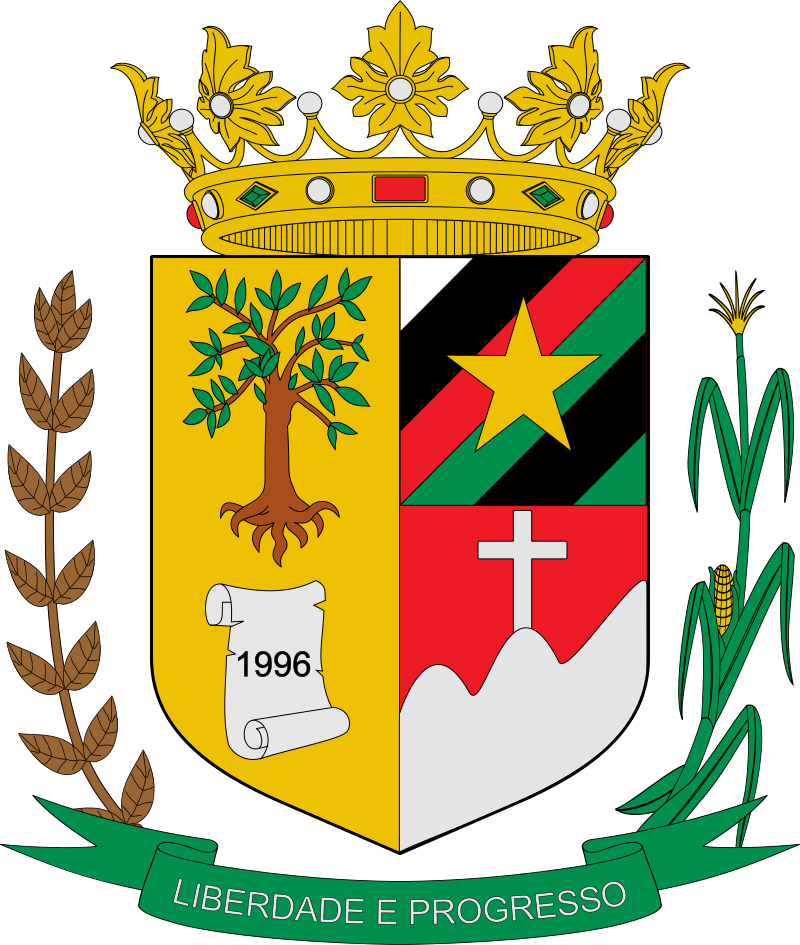
- Flag Coat of arms
- Interactive map of São Raimundo do Doca Bezerra
- Country: Brazil
- Region: Nordeste
- State: Maranhão
- Mesoregion: Centro Maranhense

Population (2020)
  - Total: 5,131
- Time zone: UTC−3 (BRT)

São Raimundo do Doca Bezerra is a municipality in the state of Maranhão in the Northeast region of Brazil.

== See also ==
- List of municipalities in Maranhão
