= Passagem Franca =

Coordinates: 6°10′S 43°47′W

- Municipality
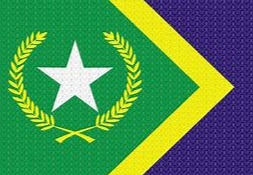
- Flag
- Interactive map of Passagem Franca
- Country: Brazil
- Region: Nordeste
- State: Maranhão
- Mesoregion: Leste Maranhense

Population (2020)
  - Total: 19,137
- Time zone: UTC−3 (BRT)

Passagem Franca is a municipality in the state of Maranhão in the Northeast region of Brazil.

== See also ==
- List of municipalities in Maranhão
