= Santa Filomena do Maranhão =

Coordinates: 5.50083°S 44.5608°W

- Municipality
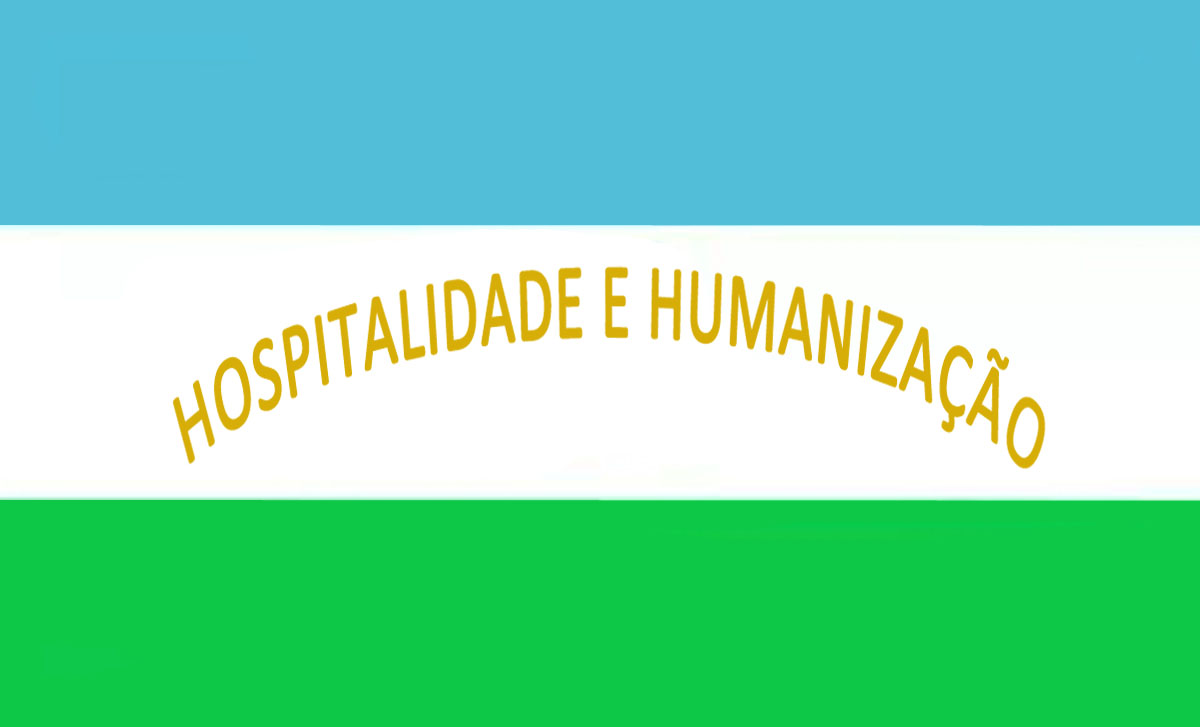
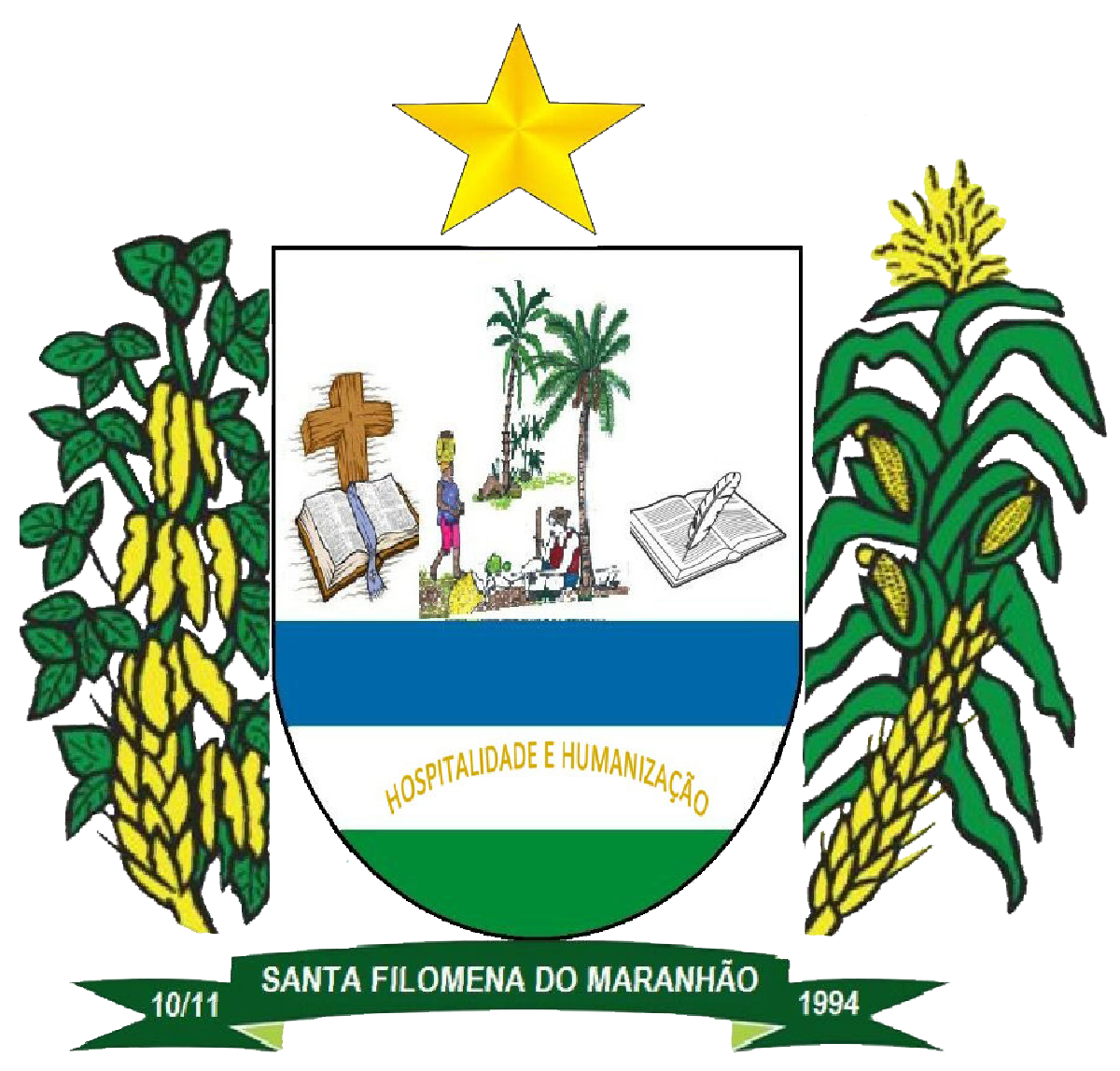
- Flag Coat of arms
- Interactive map of Santa Filomena do Maranhão
- Country: Brazil
- Region: Nordeste
- State: Maranhão
- Mesoregion: Centro Maranhense

Population (2020)
  - Total: 7,826
- Time zone: UTC−3 (BRT)

Santa Filomena do Maranhão is a municipality in the state of Maranhão in the Northeast region of Brazil.

== See also ==
- List of municipalities in Maranhão
