= Governador Eugênio Barros =

Coordinates: 5.32278°S 44.2469°W

- Municipality
- Interactive map of Governador Eugênio Barros
- Country: Brazil
- Region: Nordeste
- State: Maranhão
- Mesoregion: Centro Maranhense

Population (2020)
  - Total: 16,882
- Time zone: UTC−3 (BRT)

Governador Eugênio Barros is a municipality in the state of Maranhão in the Northeast region of Brazil.

== See also ==
- List of municipalities in Maranhão
