= Governador Luiz Rocha =

Coordinates: 5.46889°S 44.0739°W

- Municipality
- Interactive map of Governador Luiz Rocha
- Country: Brazil
- Region: Nordeste
- State: Maranhão
- Mesoregion: Centro Maranhense

Population (2020)
  - Total: 7,841
- Time zone: UTC−3 (BRT)

Governador Luiz Rocha is a municipality in the state of Maranhão in the Northeast region of Brazil.

== See also ==
- List of municipalities in Maranhão
