= Montes Altos =

Coordinates: 5°50′S 47°04′W

- Municipality
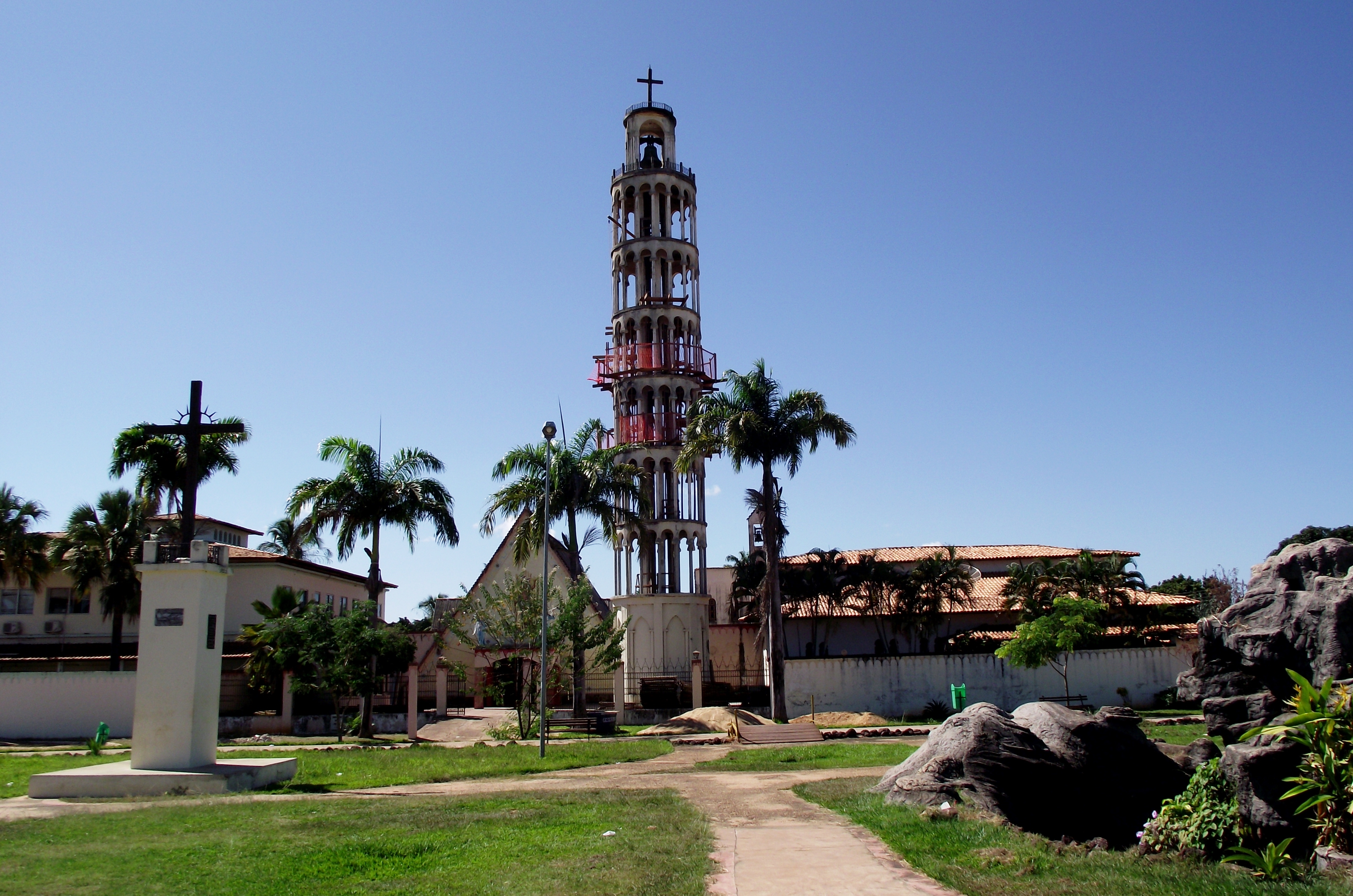
- Interactive map of Montes Altos
- Country: Brazil
- Region: Nordeste
- State: Maranhão
- Mesoregion: Oeste Maranhense

Population (2020)
  - Total: 9,111
- Time zone: UTC−3 (BRT)

Montes Altos is a municipality in the state of Maranhão in the Northeast region of Brazil.

== See also ==
- List of municipalities in Maranhão
