= Lajeado Novo =

Coordinates: 6.18889°S 47.035°W

- Municipality
- Interactive map of Lajeado Novo
- Country: Brazil
- Region: Nordeste
- State: Maranhão
- Mesoregion: Oeste Maranhense

Population (2020)
  - Total: 7,602
- Time zone: UTC−3 (BRT)

Lajeado Novo is a municipality in the state of Maranhão in the Northeast region of Brazil.

== See also ==
- List of municipalities in Maranhão
