= Sítio Novo =

Coordinates: 5°53′S 46°42′W

- Municipality
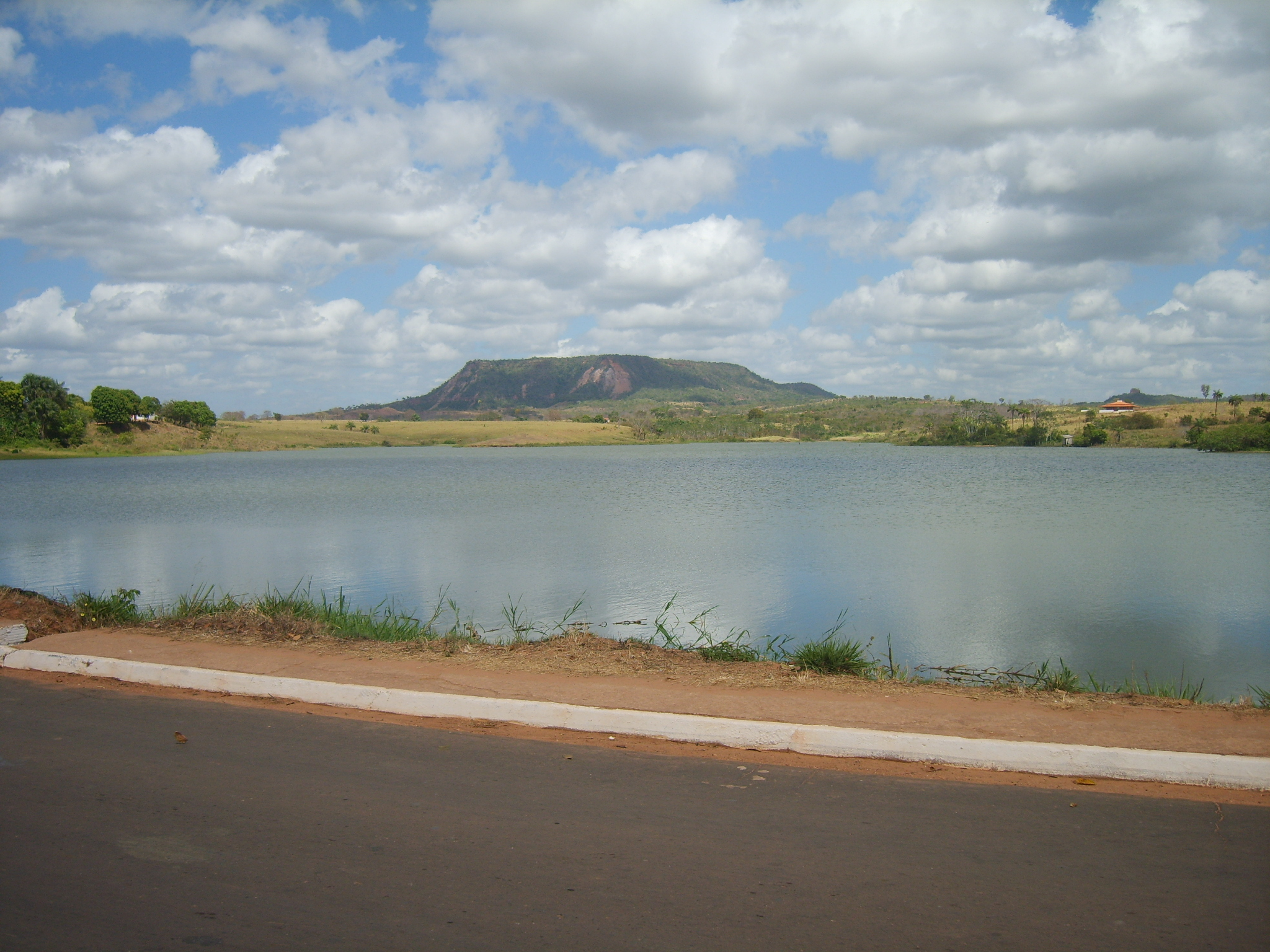
- Interactive map of Sítio Novo
- Country: Brazil
- Region: Nordeste
- State: Maranhão
- Mesoregion: Centro Maranhense

Population (2020)
  - Total: 18,160
- Time zone: UTC−3 (BRT)

Sítio Novo is a municipality in the state of Maranhão in the Northeast region of Brazil.

== See also ==
- List of municipalities in Maranhão
