= Bom Lugar =

Coordinates: 4.22°S 45.0389°W

- Municipality
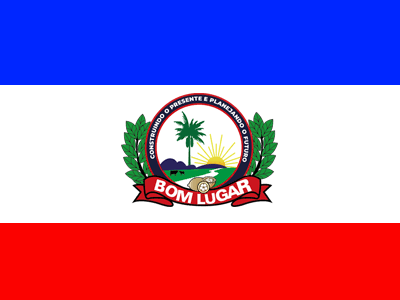
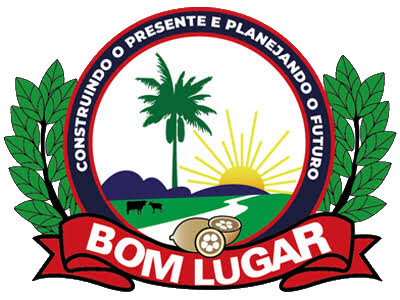
- Flag Coat of arms
- Interactive map of Bom Lugar
- Country: Brazil
- Region: Nordeste
- State: Maranhão
- Mesoregion: Centro Maranhense

Population (2020)
  - Total: 16,438
- Time zone: UTC−3 (BRT)

Bom Lugar is a municipality in the state of Maranhão in the Northeast region of Brazil.

== See also ==
- List of municipalities in Maranhão
