= Itaipava do Grajaú =

Coordinates: 5.145°S 45.7908°W

- Municipality
- Interactive map of Itaipava do Grajaú
- Country: Brazil
- Region: Nordeste
- State: Maranhão
- Mesoregion: Centro Maranhense

Population (2020)
  - Total: 16,005
- Time zone: UTC -3

Itaipava do Grajaú is a municipality in the state of Maranhão in the Northeast region of Brazil.

== See also ==
- List of municipalities in Maranhão
