= Capinzal do Norte =

Coordinates: 4.72778°S 44.3269°W

- Municipality
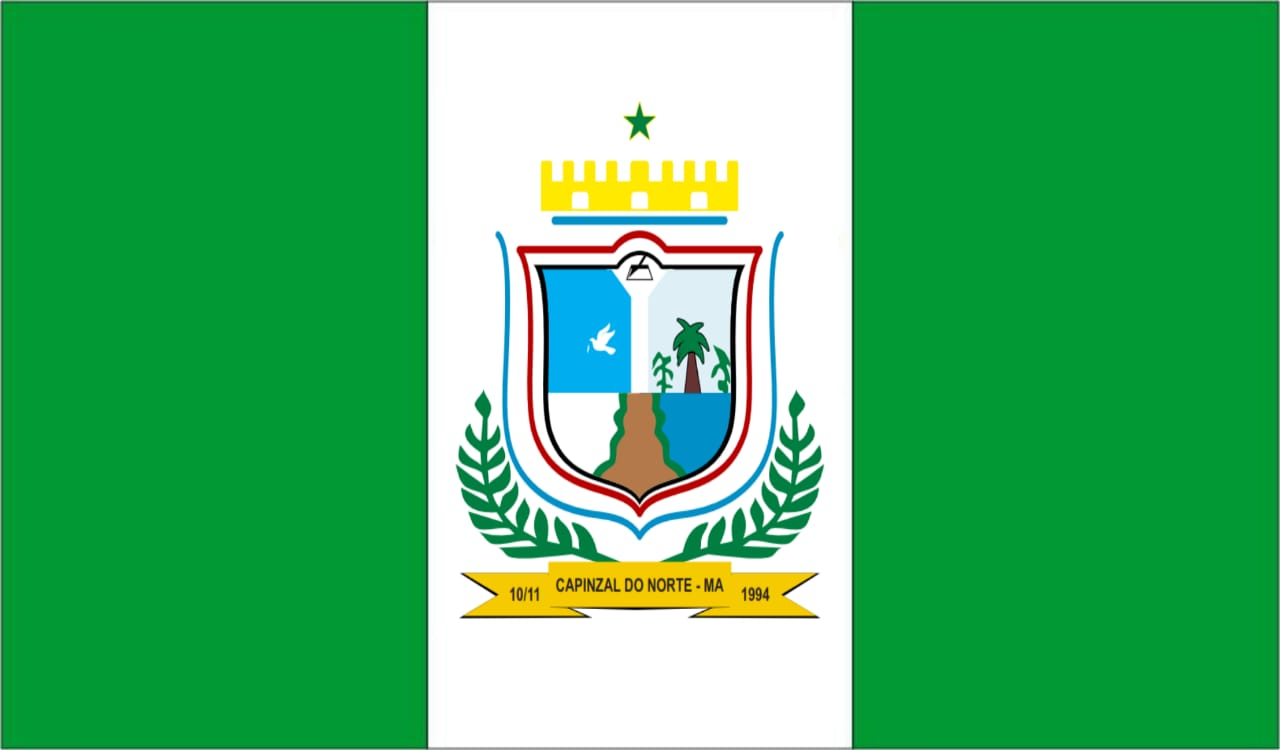
- Flag
- Interactive map of Capinzal do Norte
- Country: Brazil
- Region: Nordeste
- State: Maranhão
- Mesoregion: Leste Maranhense

Population (2020)
  - Total: 10,935
- Time zone: UTC−3 (BRT)

Capinzal do Norte is a municipality in the state of Maranhão in the Northeast region of Brazil.

== See also ==
- List of municipalities in Maranhão
