= Apicum-Açu =

Coordinates: 1.46083°S 45.1028°W

- Municipality
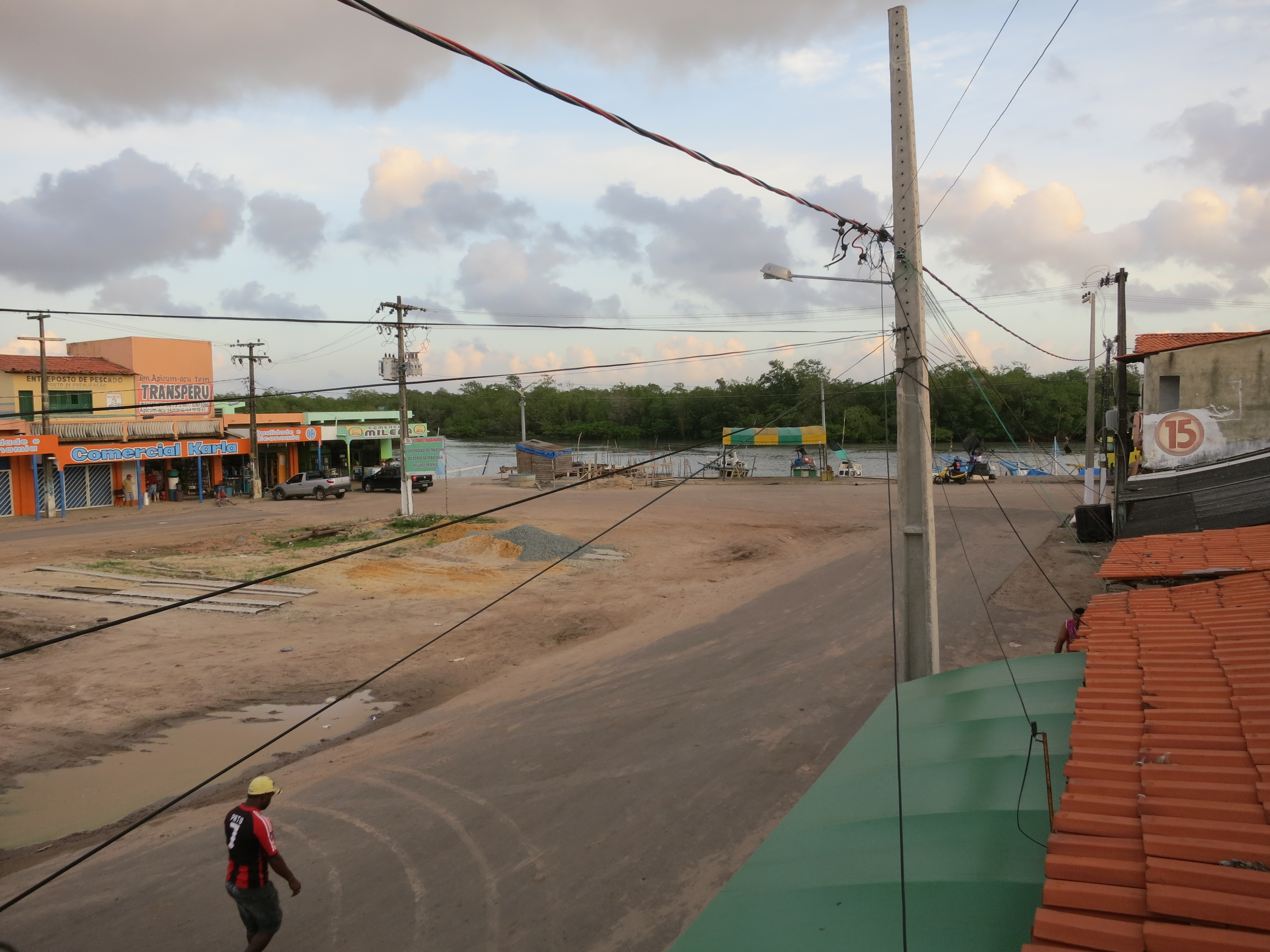

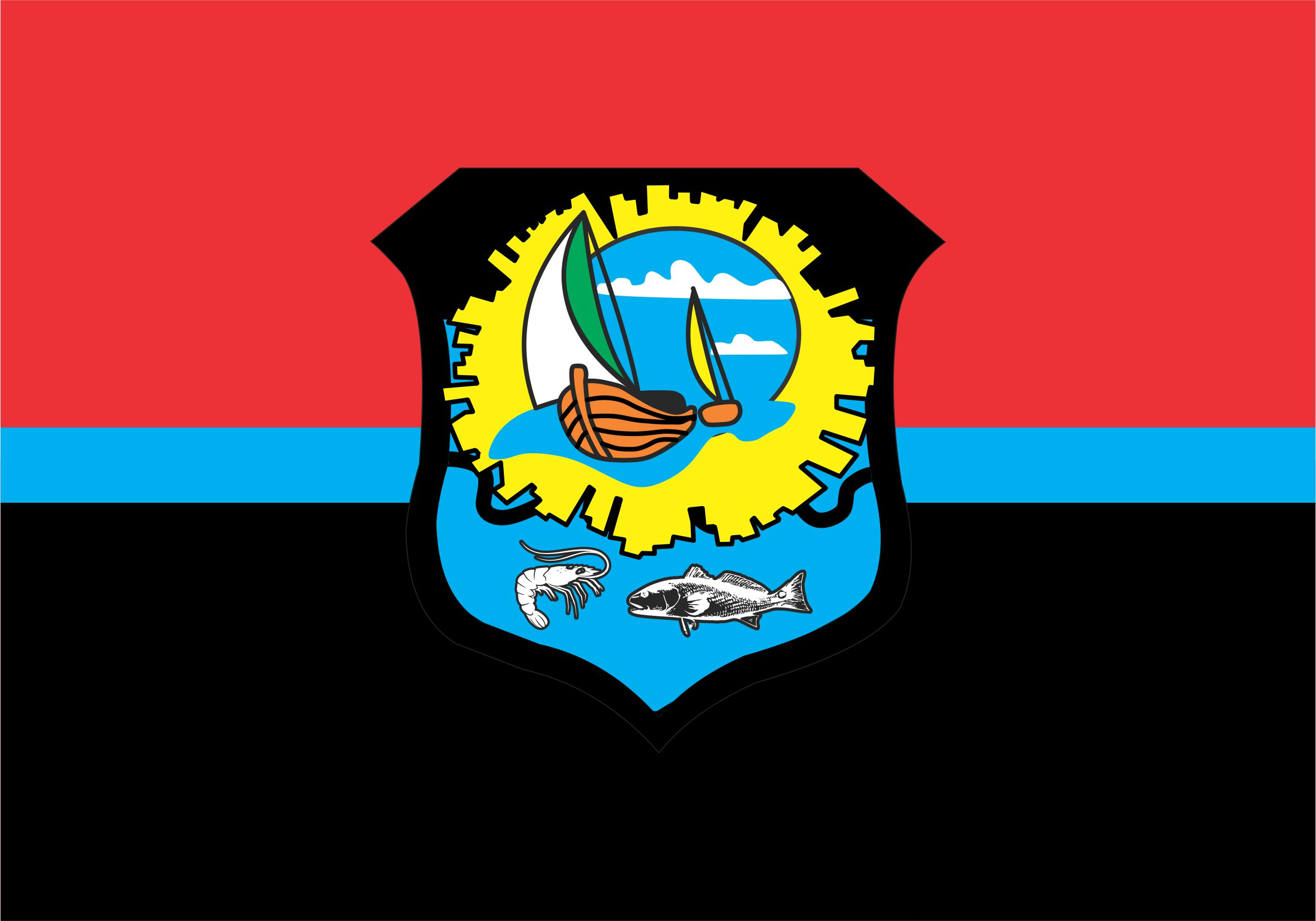
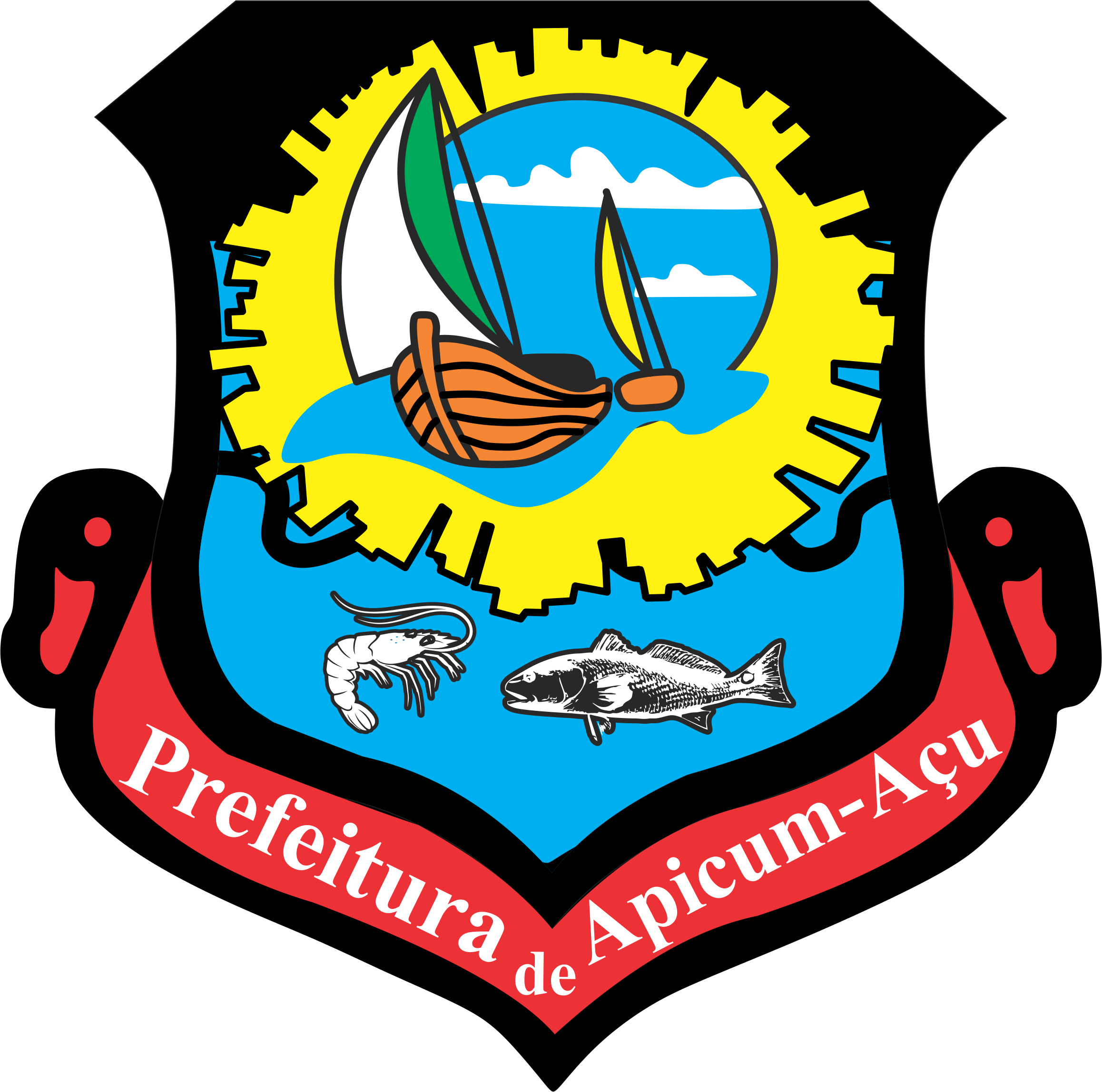
- Flag Coat of arms
- Interactive map of Apicum-Açu
- Country: Brazil
- Region: Nordeste
- State: Maranhão
- Mesoregion: Norte Maranhense

Population (2020)
  - Total: 17,413
- Time zone: UTC−3 (BRT)

Apicum-Açu is a municipality in the state of Maranhão in the Northeast region of Brazil.

== See also ==
- List of municipalities in Maranhão
