= Sucupira do Riachão =

Coordinates: 6.41083°S 43.5458°W

- Municipality
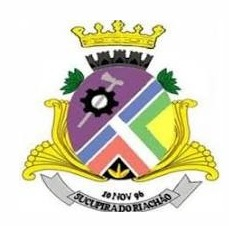
- Flag Coat of arms
- Interactive map of Sucupira do Riachão
- Country: Brazil
- Region: Nordeste
- State: Maranhão
- Mesoregion: Leste Maranhense

Population (2020)
  - Total: 5,676
- Time zone: UTC−3 (BRT)

Sucupira do Riachão is a municipality in the state of Maranhão in the Northeast region of Brazil.

== See also ==
- List of municipalities in Maranhão
