= São João do Paraíso, Maranhão =

Coordinates: 6°27′39″S 47°03′28″W

- Municipality
- Interactive map of São João do Paraíso, Maranhão
- Country: Brazil
- Region: Nordeste
- State: Maranhão
- Mesoregion: Sul Maranhense
- Elevation: 750 ft (230 m)

Population (2020)
  - Total: 11,193
- Time zone: UTC−3 (BRT)

São João do Paraíso, Maranhão is a municipality in the state of Maranhão in the Northeast region of Brazil.

== See also ==
- List of municipalities in Maranhão
