= Maracaçumé =

Coordinates: 2°03′S 45°56′W

- Municipality
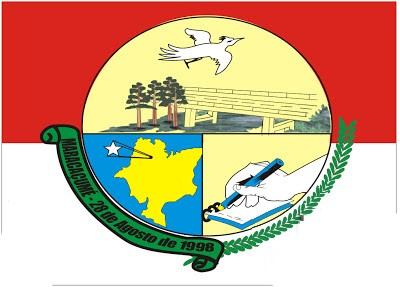
- Flag
- Interactive map of Maracaçumé
- Country: Brazil
- Region: Nordeste
- State: Maranhão
- Mesoregion: Oeste Maranhense

Population (2020)
  - Total: 21,586
- Time zone: UTC−3 (BRT)

Maracaçumé is a municipality in the state of Maranhão in the Northeast region of Brazil.

== See also ==
- List of municipalities in Maranhão
