= Fortuna, Maranhão =

Coordinates: 5.73278°S 44.1578°W

Fortuna
- Municipality
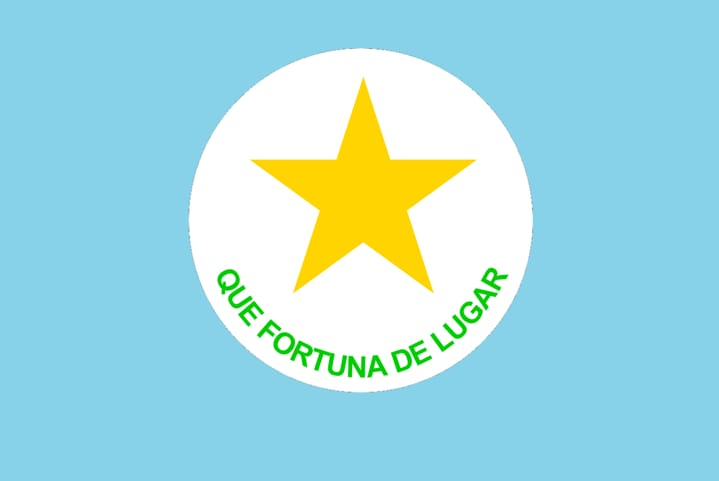
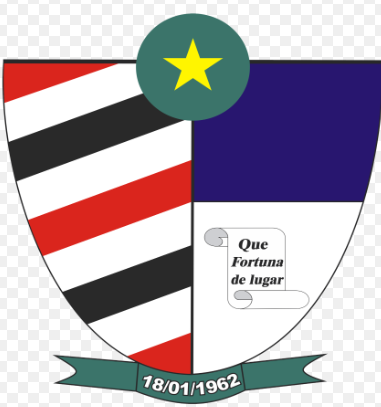
- Flag Coat of arms
- Interactive map of Fortuna
- Country: Brazil
- Region: Nordeste
- State: Maranhão
- Mesoregion: Centro Maranhense

Population (2020)
  - Total: 15,567
- Time zone: UTC−3 (BRT)

Fortuna is a municipality in the state of Maranhão in the Northeast region of Brazil.

== See also ==
- List of municipalities in Maranhão
