= Joselândia =

Coordinates: 4.96694°S 44.7°W

- Municipality
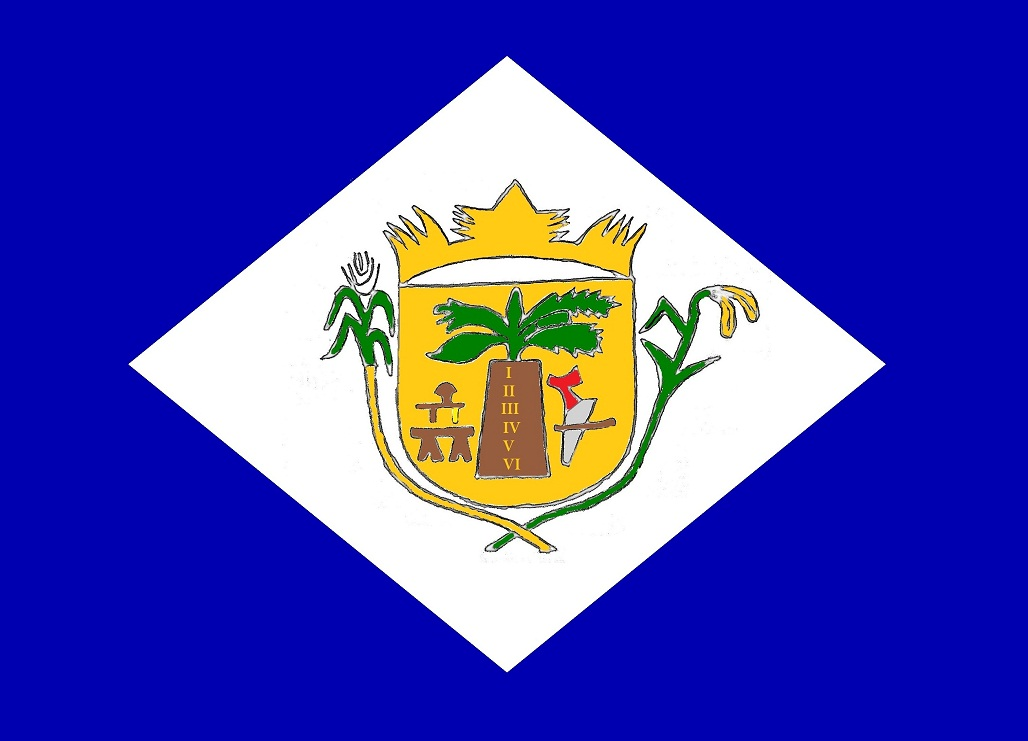
- Flag
- Interactive map of Joselândia
- Country: Brazil
- Region: Nordeste
- State: Maranhão
- Mesoregion: Centro Maranhense

Population (2020)
  - Total: 16,198
- Time zone: UTC−3 (BRT)

Joselândia is a municipality in the state of Maranhão in the Northeast region of Brazil.

== See also ==
- List of municipalities in Maranhão
