= Bernardo do Mearim =

Coordinates: 4.58389°S 44.7639°W

- Municipality
- Interactive map of Bernardo do Mearim
- Country: Brazil
- Region: Nordeste
- State: Maranhão
- Mesoregion: Centro Maranhense

Population (2020)
  - Total: 6,073
- Time zone: UTC−3 (BRT)

Bernardo do Mearim is a municipality in the state of Maranhão in the Northeast region of Brazil.

== See also ==
- List of municipalities in Maranhão
