= Centro do Guilherme =

Coordinates: 2.36889°S 46.0019°W

- Municipality
- The centre of Centro do Guilherme in June 2017

- Flag Seal
- Interactive map of Centro do Guilherme
- Country: Brazil
- Region: Nordeste
- State: Maranhão
- Mesoregion: Oeste Maranhense

Population (2022)
  - Total: 12,342
- Time zone: UTC−3 (BRT)

Centro do Guilherme is a municipality in the state of Maranhão in the Northeast region of Brazil.

== See also ==
- List of municipalities in Maranhão
