= Junco do Maranhão =

Coordinates: 1.84389°S 46.0919°W

- Municipality
- Interactive map of Junco do Maranhão
- Country: Brazil
- Region: Nordeste
- State: Maranhão
- Mesoregion: Oeste Maranhense

Population (2020)
  - Total: 4,392
- Time zone: UTC−3 (BRT)

Junco do Maranhão is a municipality in the state of Maranhão in the Northeast region of Brazil.

== See also ==
- List of municipalities in Maranhão
