= Alto Alegre do Maranhão =

Coordinates: 4.21278°S 44.4458°W

- Municipality
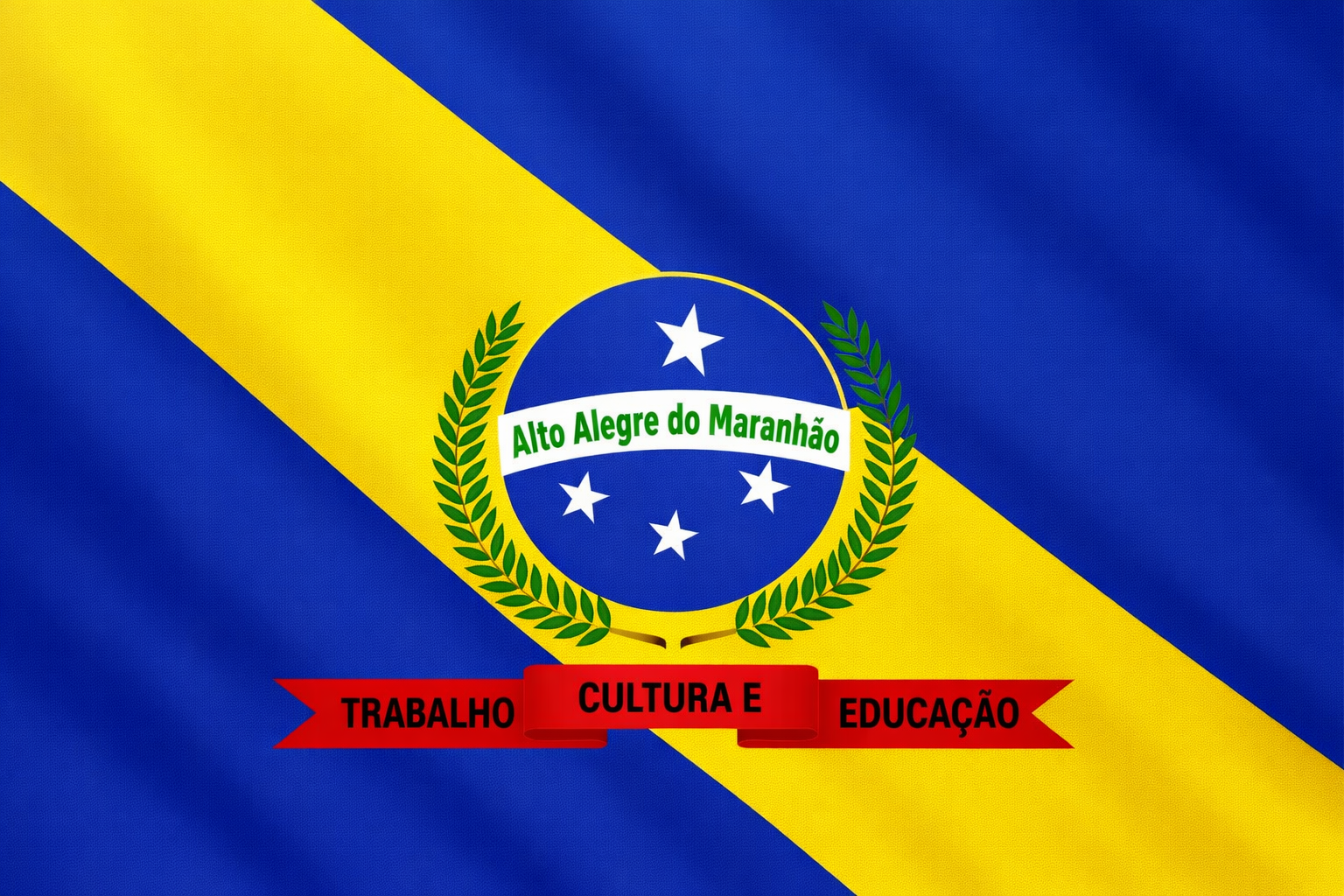
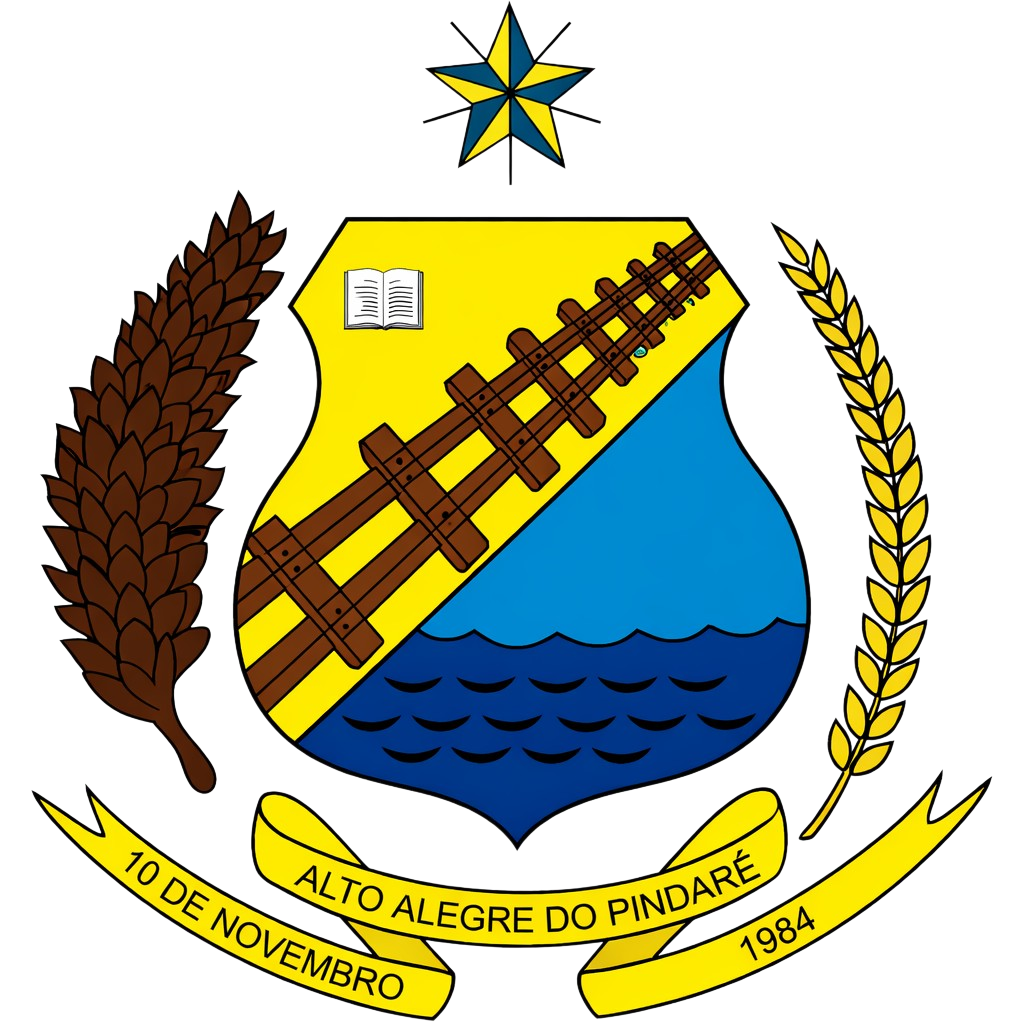
- Flag Coat of arms
- Interactive map of Alto Alegre do Maranhão
- Country: Brazil
- Region: Nordeste
- State: Maranhão
- Mesoregion: Leste Maranhense

Population (2020)
  - Total: 27,858
- Time zone: UTC−3 (BRT)

Alto Alegre do Maranhão is a municipality in the state of Maranhão in the Northeast region of Brazil.

== See also ==
- List of municipalities in Maranhão
