= Alto Alegre do Pindaré =

Coordinates: 3.69°S 45.9028°W

- Municipality
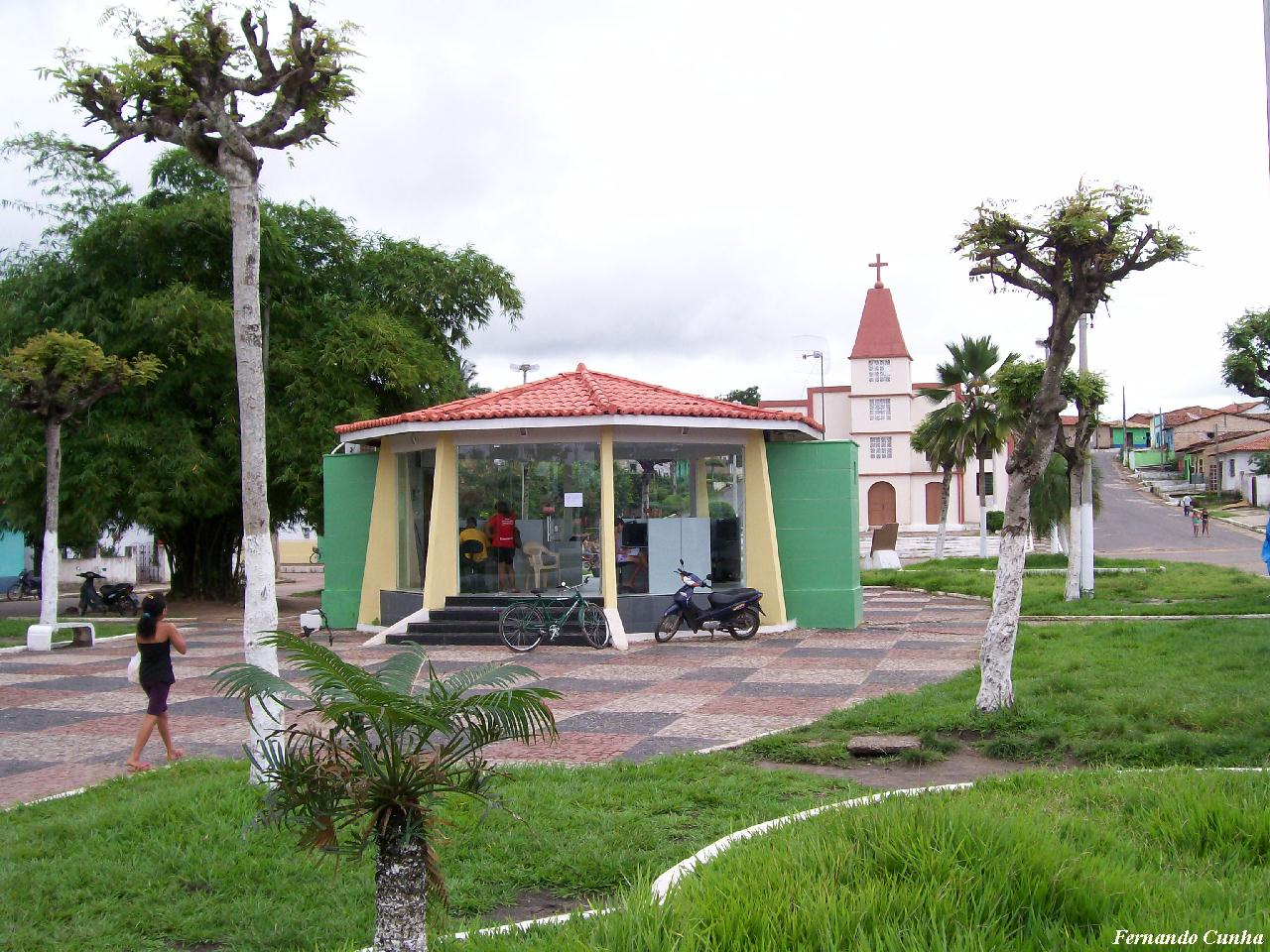

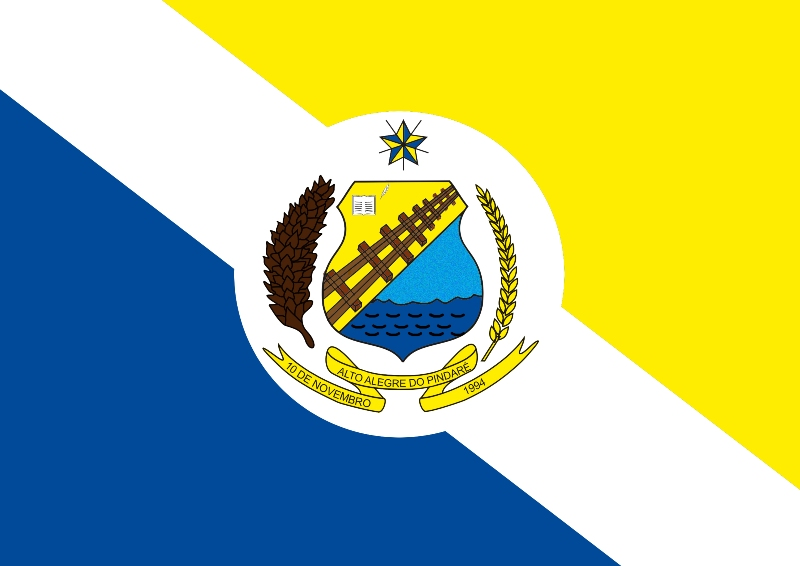
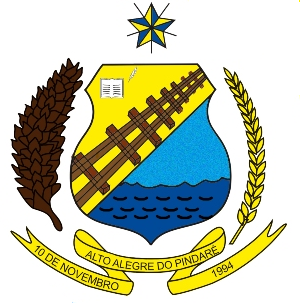
- Flag Coat of arms
- Interactive map of Alto Alegre do Pindaré
- Country: Brazil
- Region: Nordeste
- State: Maranhão
- Mesoregion: Oeste Maranhense

Population (2020)
  - Total: 31,943
- Time zone: UTC−3 (BRT)

Alto Alegre do Pindaré is a municipality in the state of Maranhão in the Northeast region of Brazil.

The city has one of the most important and largest railway stations on the Carajás Railway line.

== See also ==
- List of municipalities in Maranhão
