= São Domingos do Azeitão =

Coordinates: 6.81°S 44.645°W

- Municipality
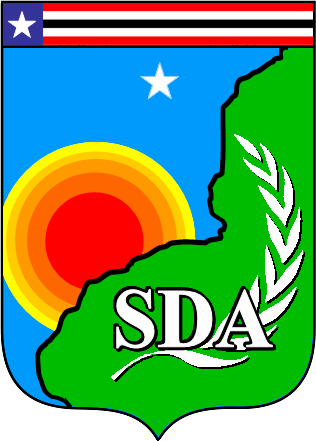
- Coat of arms
- Interactive map of São Domingos do Azeitão
- Country: Brazil
- Region: Nordeste
- State: Maranhão
- Mesoregion: Sul Maranhense

Population (2020)
  - Total: 7,420
- Time zone: UTC−3 (BRT)

São Domingos do Azeitão is a municipality in the state of Maranhão in the Northeast region of Brazil.

== See also ==
- List of municipalities in Maranhão
