= Nova Olinda do Maranhão =

Coordinates: 2.84694°S 45.695°W

- Municipality
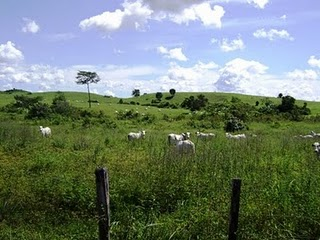

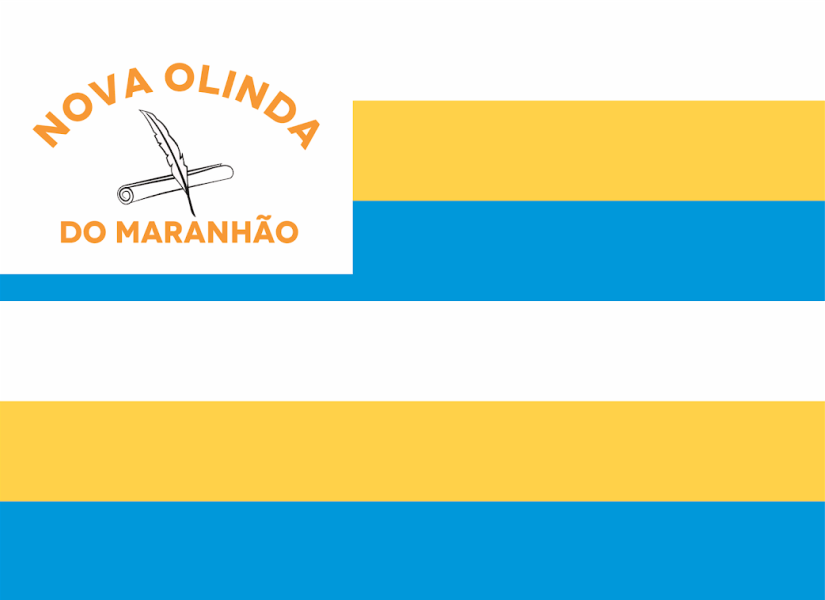
- Flag
- Interactive map of Nova Olinda do Maranhão
- Country: Brazil
- Region: Nordeste
- State: Maranhão
- Mesoregion: Oeste Maranhense

Population (2020)
  - Total: 21,080
- Time zone: UTC−3 (BRT)

Nova Olinda do Maranhão is a municipality in the state of Maranhão in the Northeast region of Brazil.

== See also ==
- List of municipalities in Maranhão
