= Fernando Falcão =

Coordinates: 6.15194°S 44.8928°W

- Municipality
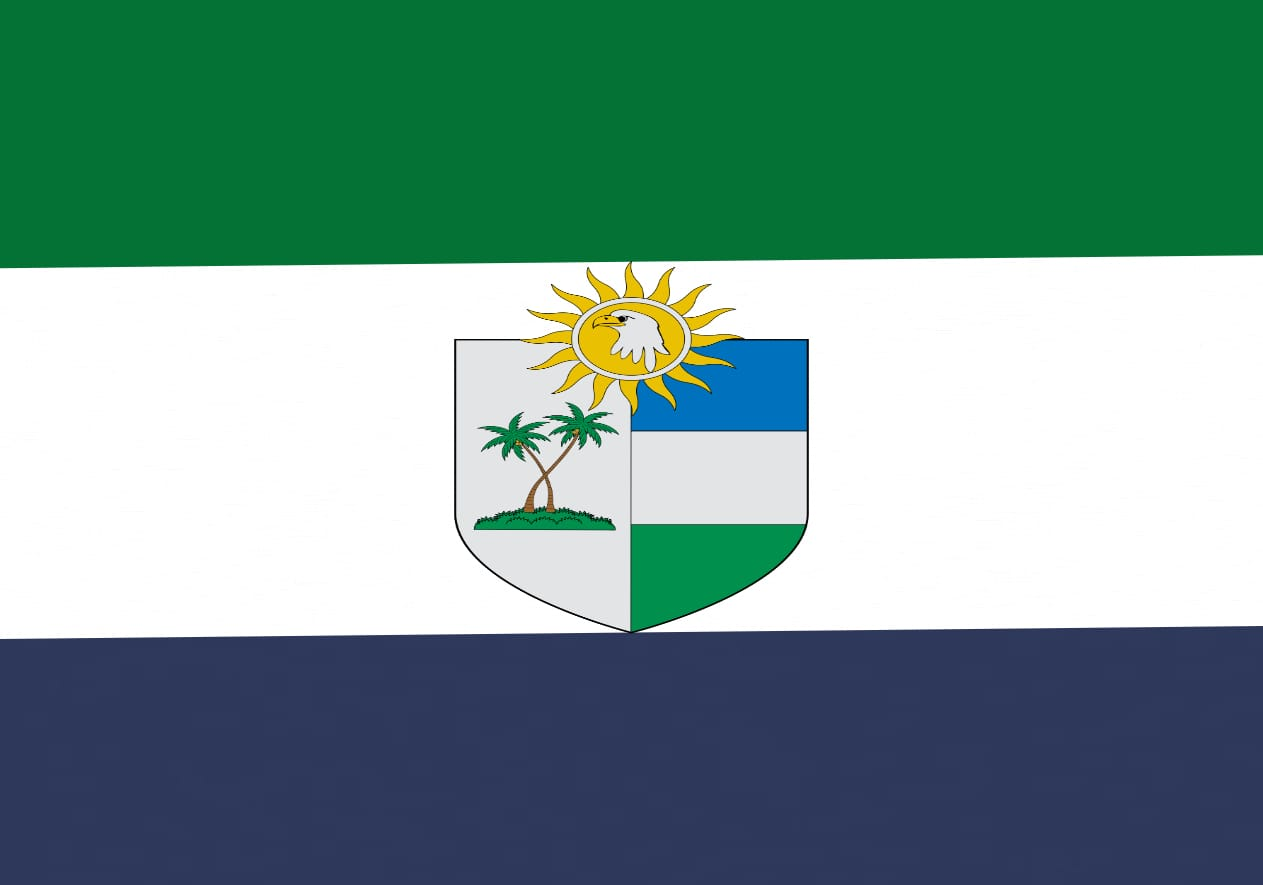
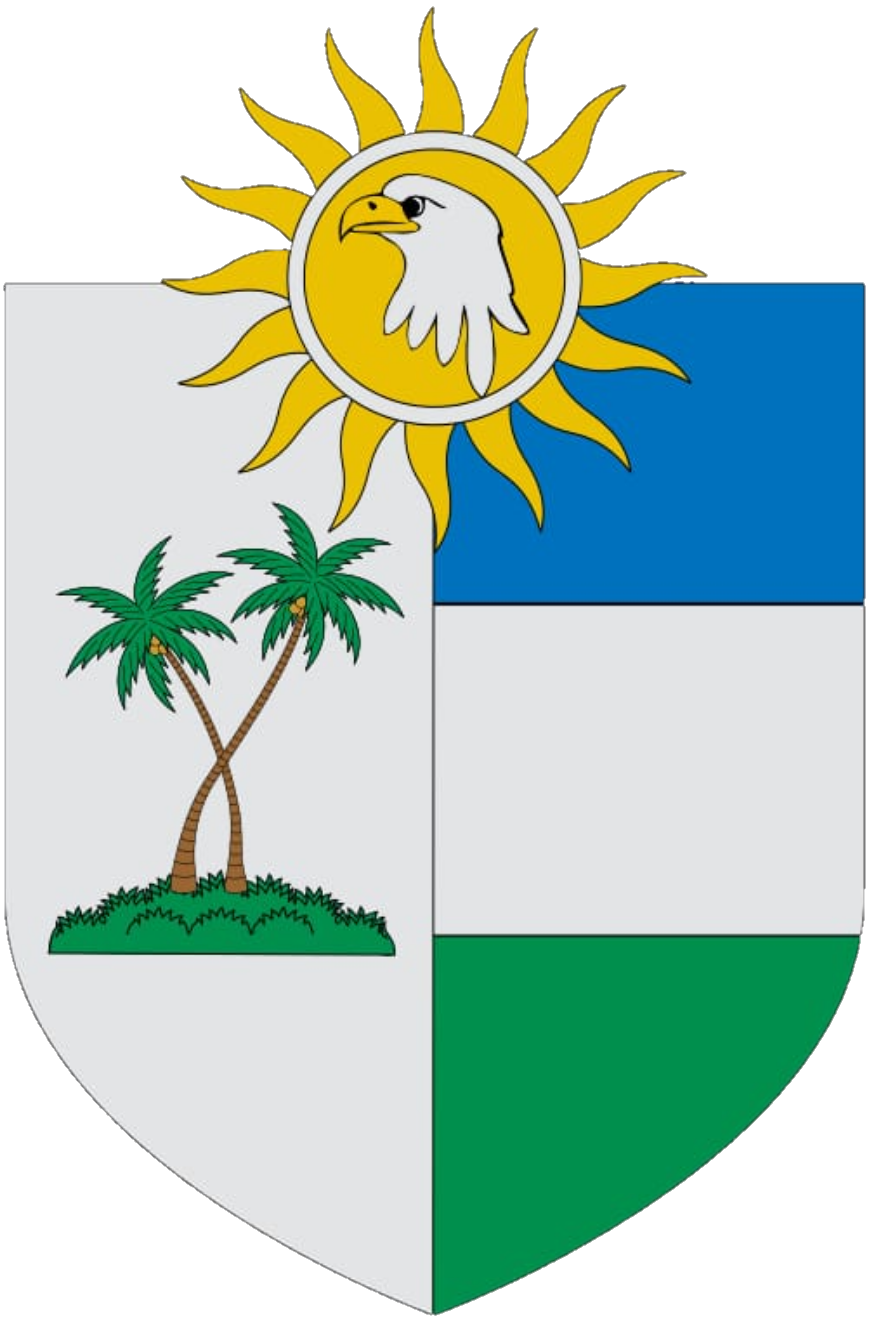
- Flag Coat of arms

- Location in Maranhão state
- Country: Brazil
- Region: Nordeste
- State: Maranhão
- Mesoregion: Centro Maranhense

Population (2020)
  - Total: 10,460
- Time zone: UTC−3 (BRT)

Fernando Falcão is a municipality in the state of Maranhão in the Northeast region of Brazil.

== See also ==
- List of municipalities in Maranhão
