= Senador La Rocque =

Coordinates: 5.44278°S 47.2908°W

- Municipality
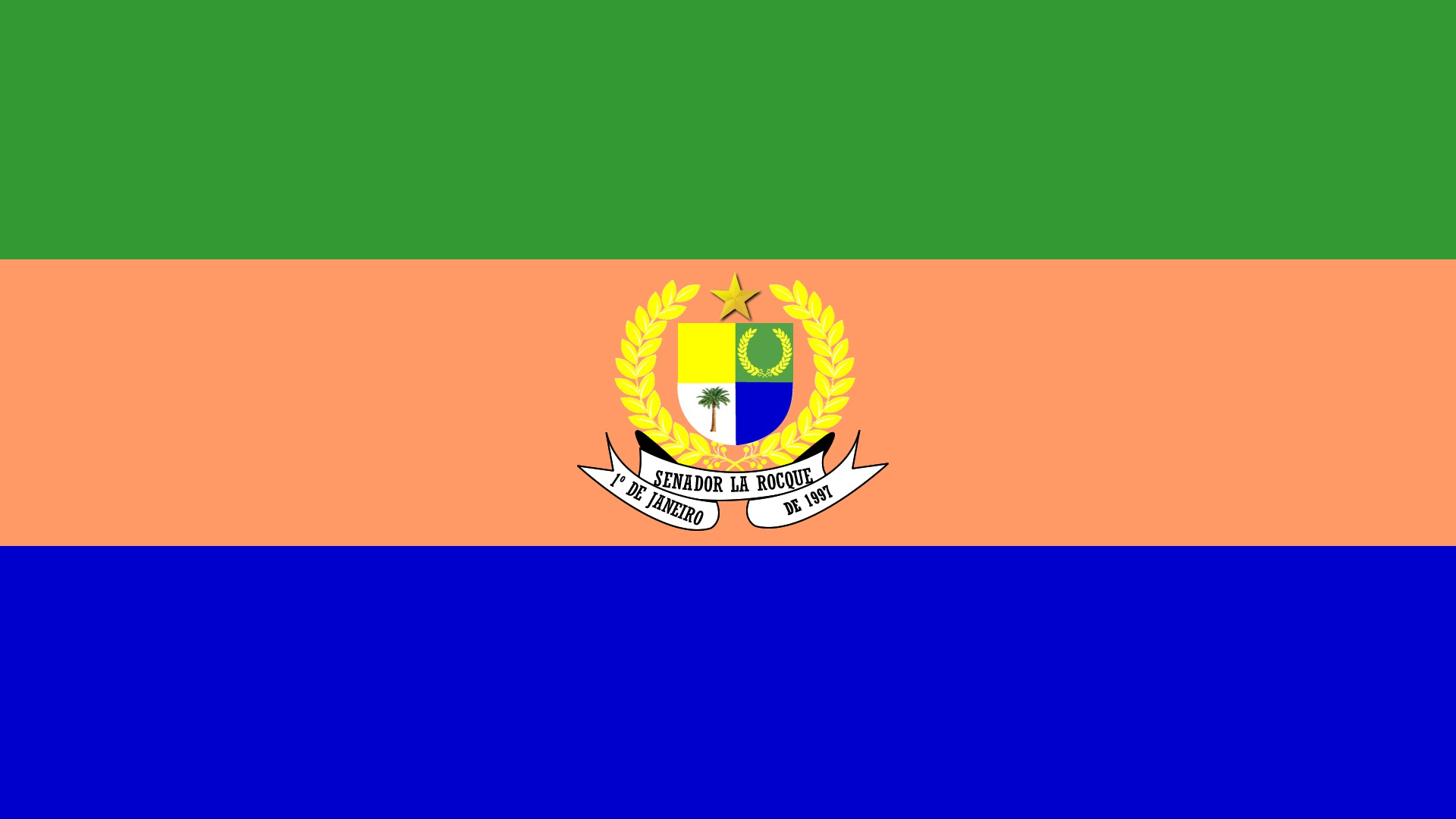
- Flag
- Interactive map of Senador La Rocque
- Country: Brazil
- Region: Nordeste
- State: Maranhão
- Mesoregion: Oeste Maranhense

Population (2020)
  - Total: 14,050
- Time zone: UTC−3 (BRT)

Senador La Rocque is a municipality in the state of Maranhão in the Northeast region of Brazil.

== See also ==
- List of municipalities in Maranhão
