= Boa Vista do Gurupi =

Coordinates: 1.78778°S 46.3028°W

- Municipality
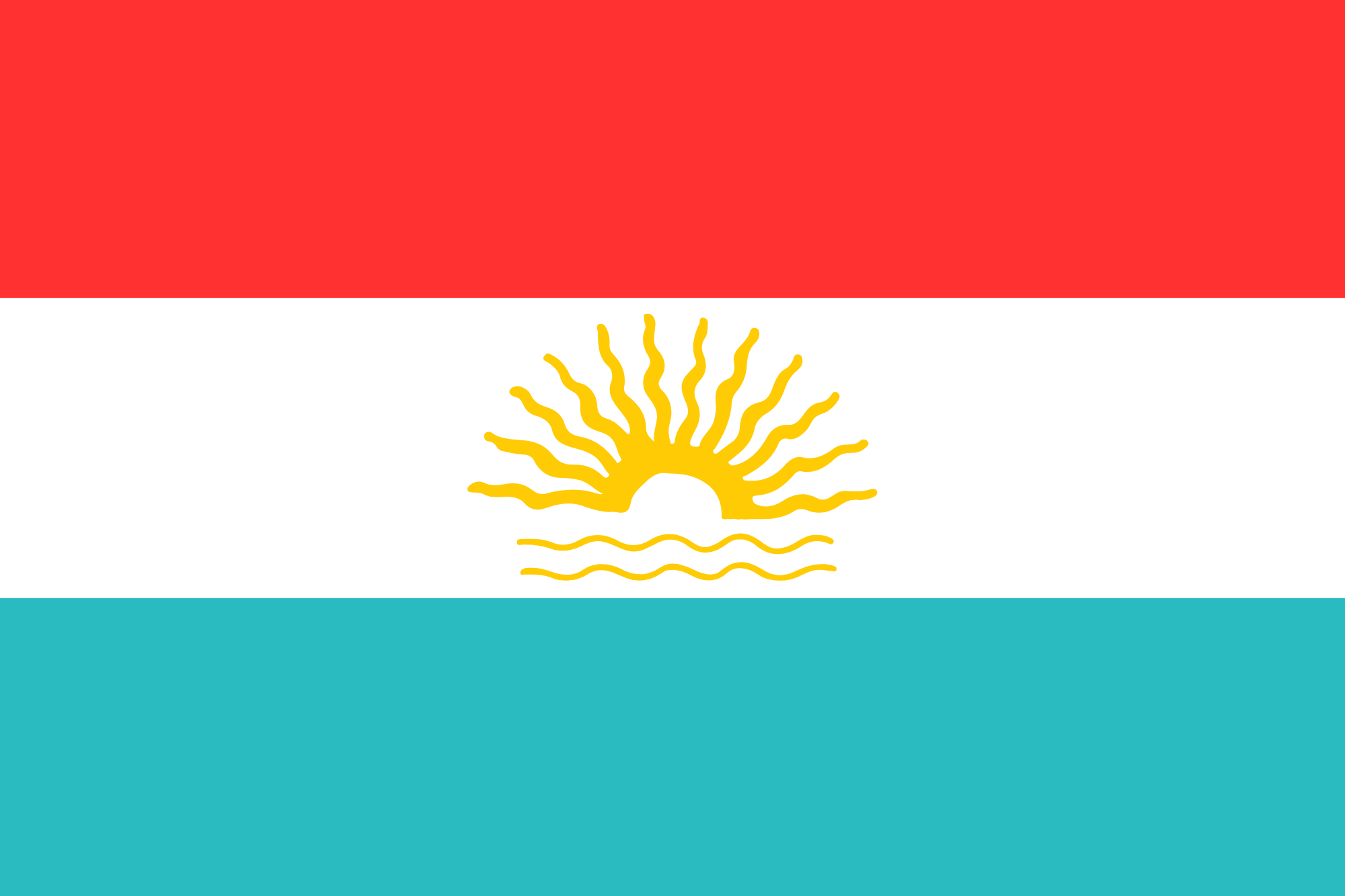
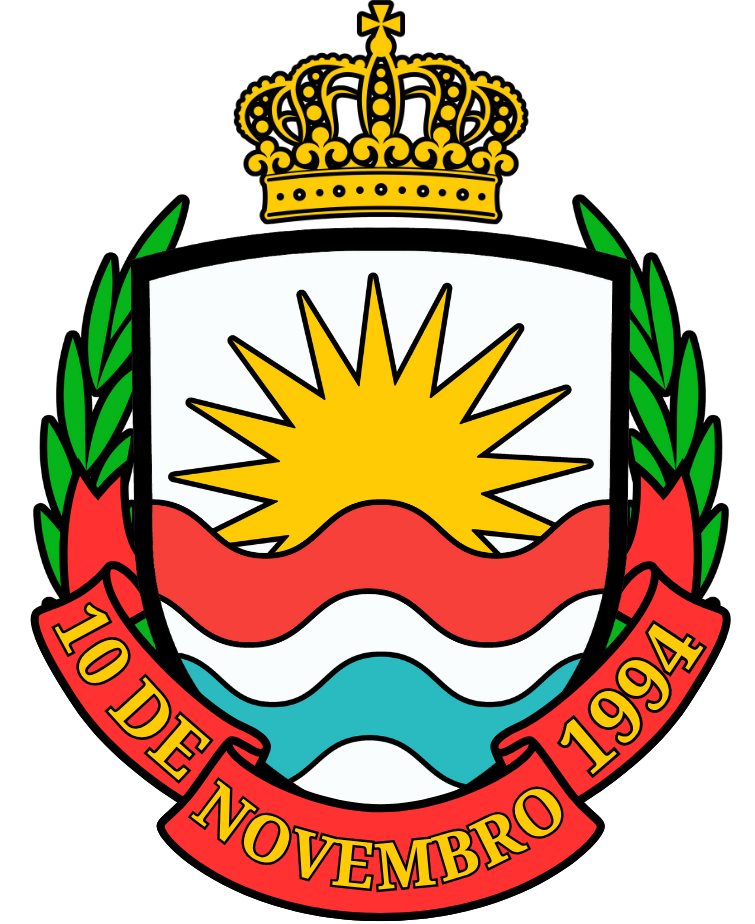
- Flag Coat of arms
- Interactive map of Boa Vista do Gurupi
- Country: Brazil
- Region: Nordeste
- State: Maranhão
- Mesoregion: Oeste Maranhense

Population (2020)
  - Total: 8,382
- Time zone: UTC−3 (BRT)

Boa Vista do Gurupi is a municipality in the state of Maranhão in the Northeast region of Brazil.

== See also ==
- List of municipalities in Maranhão
