= São Félix de Balsas =

Coordinates: 7°08′S 44°52′W

- Municipality
- Interactive map of São Félix de Balsas
- Country: Brazil
- Region: Nordeste
- State: Maranhão
- Mesoregion: Sul Maranhense

Area
  - Total: 785 sq mi (2,032 km^{2})

Population (2020)
  - Total: 4,562
- Time zone: UTC−3 (BRT)

São Félix de Balsas is a municipality in the state of Maranhão in the Northeast region of Brazil.

== See also ==
- List of municipalities in Maranhão
