= Formosa da Serra Negra =

Coordinates: 6.435°S 46.1908°W

- Municipality
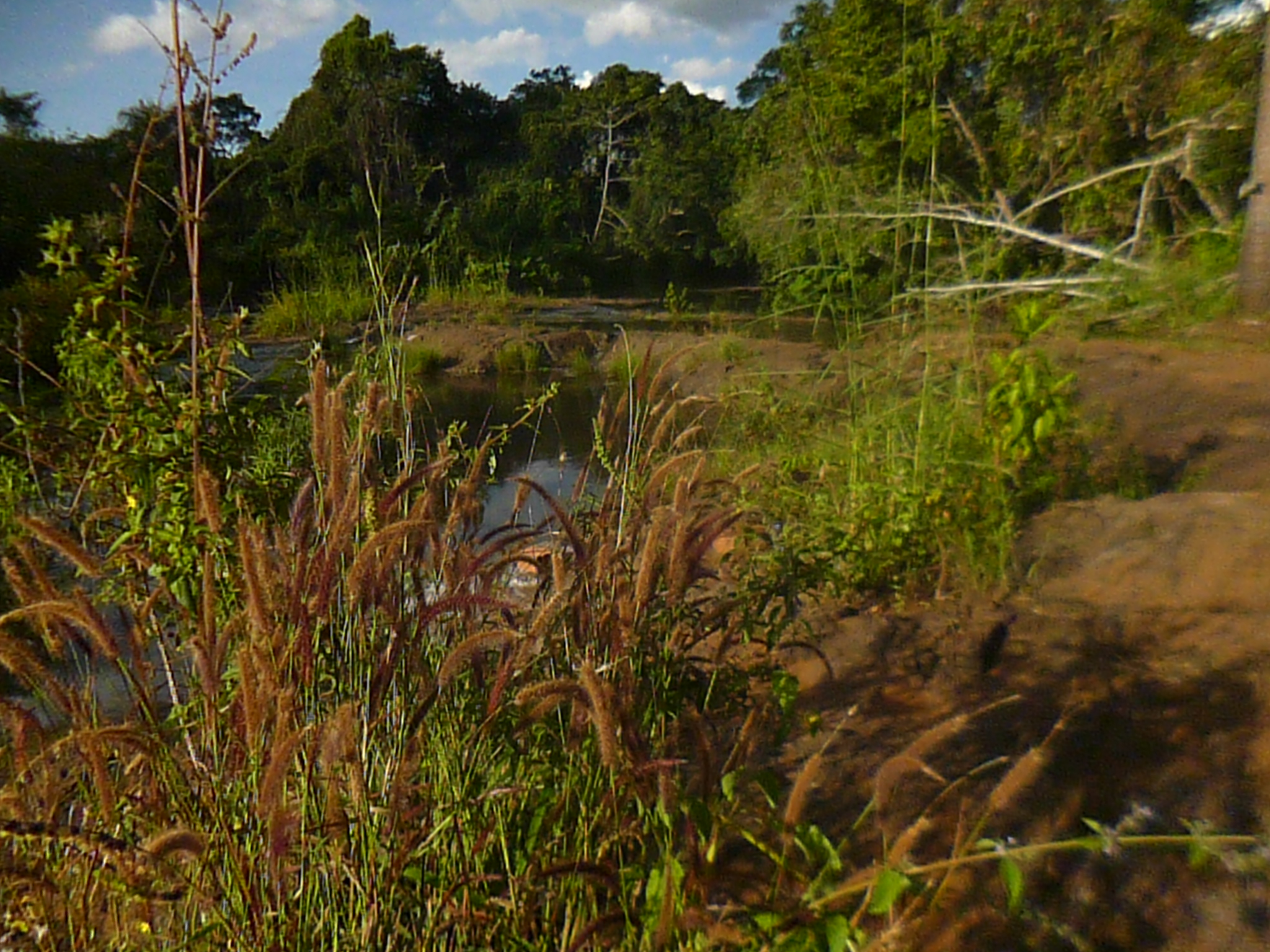

- Location in Maranhão state
- Country: Brazil
- Region: Nordeste
- State: Maranhão
- Mesoregion: Centro Maranhense

Population (2020)
  - Total: 19,258
- Time zone: UTC−3 (BRT)

Formosa da Serra Negra is a municipality in the state of Maranhão in the Northeast region of Brazil.

== See also ==
- List of municipalities in Maranhão
