= Sambaíba =

Coordinates: 7.14°S 45.3458°W

- Municipality
- Interactive map of Sambaíba
- Country: Brazil
- Region: Nordeste
- State: Maranhão
- Mesoregion: Sul Maranhense

Population (2020)
  - Total: 5,679
- Time zone: UTC−3 (BRT)

Sambaíba is a municipality in the state of Maranhão in the Northeast region of Brazil.

== See also ==
- List of municipalities in Maranhão
