= Fortaleza dos Nogueiras =

Coordinates: 6°54′S 46°09′W

- Municipality
- Interactive map of Fortaleza dos Nogueiras
- Country: Brazil
- Region: Nordeste
- State: Maranhão
- Mesoregion: Sul Maranhense

Population (2020)
  - Total: 12,647
- Time zone: UTC−3 (BRT)

Fortaleza dos Nogueiras is a municipality in the state of Maranhão in the Northeast region of Brazil.

== See also ==
- List of municipalities in Maranhão
