= Brejo de Areia =

Coordinates: 4.33389°S 45.5808°W

- Municipality
- Interactive map of Brejo de Areia
- Country: Brazil
- Region: Nordeste
- State: Maranhão
- Mesoregion: Oeste Maranhense

Population (2020)
  - Total: 9,014
- Time zone: UTC−3 (BRT)

Brejo de Areia is a municipality in the state of Maranhão in the Northeast region of Brazil.

== See also ==
- List of municipalities in Maranhão
