= São Roberto =

Coordinates: 5.02083°S 44.9908°W

- Municipality
- Flag
- Interactive map of São Roberto
- Country: Brazil
- Region: Nordeste
- State: Maranhão
- Mesoregion: Centro Maranhense

Population (2020)
  - Total: 6,789
- Time zone: UTC−3 (BRT)

São Roberto is a municipality in the state of Maranhão in the Northeast region of Brazil.

== See also ==
- List of municipalities in Maranhão
