= Governador Edison Lobão =

Coordinates: 5.74889°S 47.3608°W

Ribeirãozinho do Maranhão
- Municipality
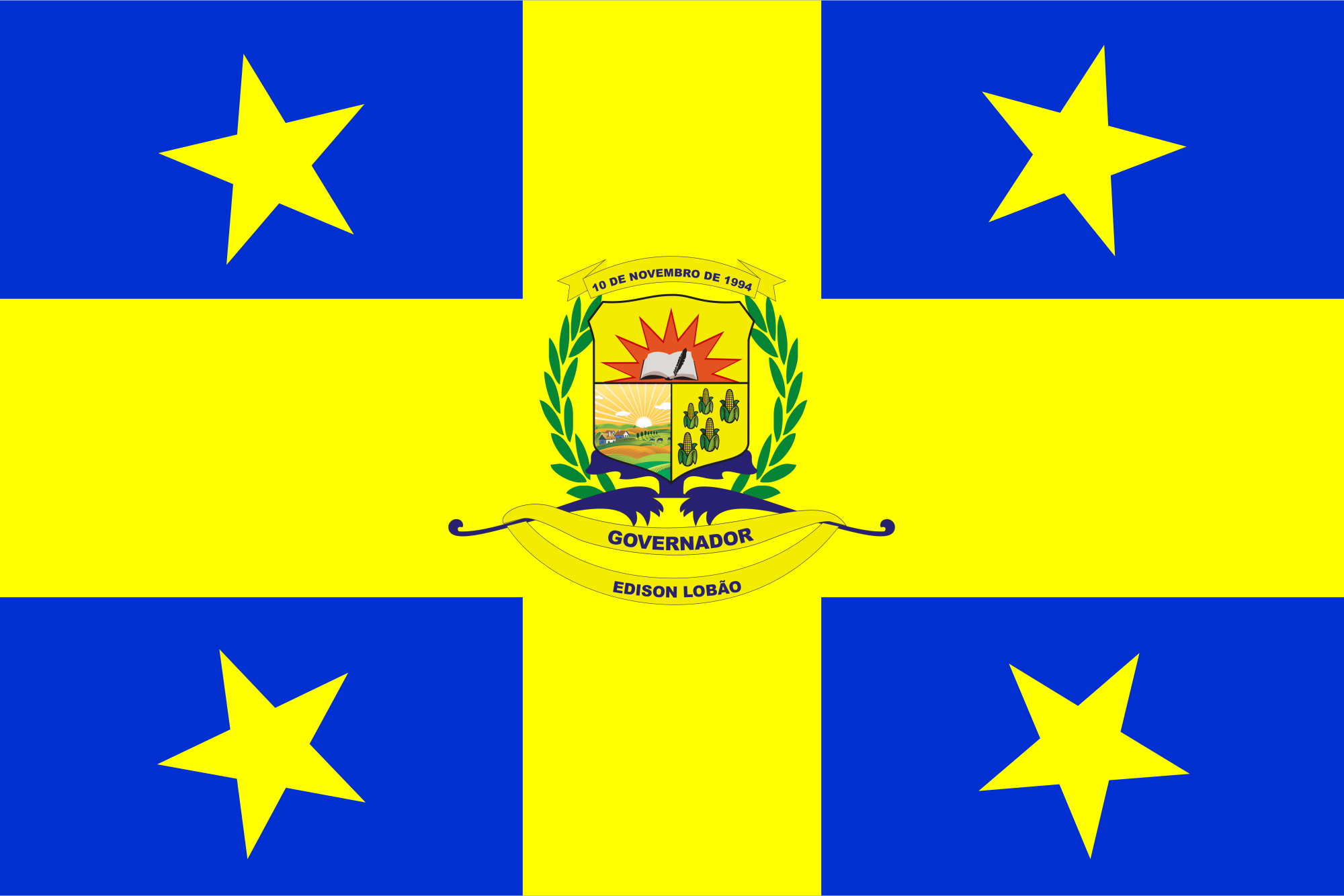
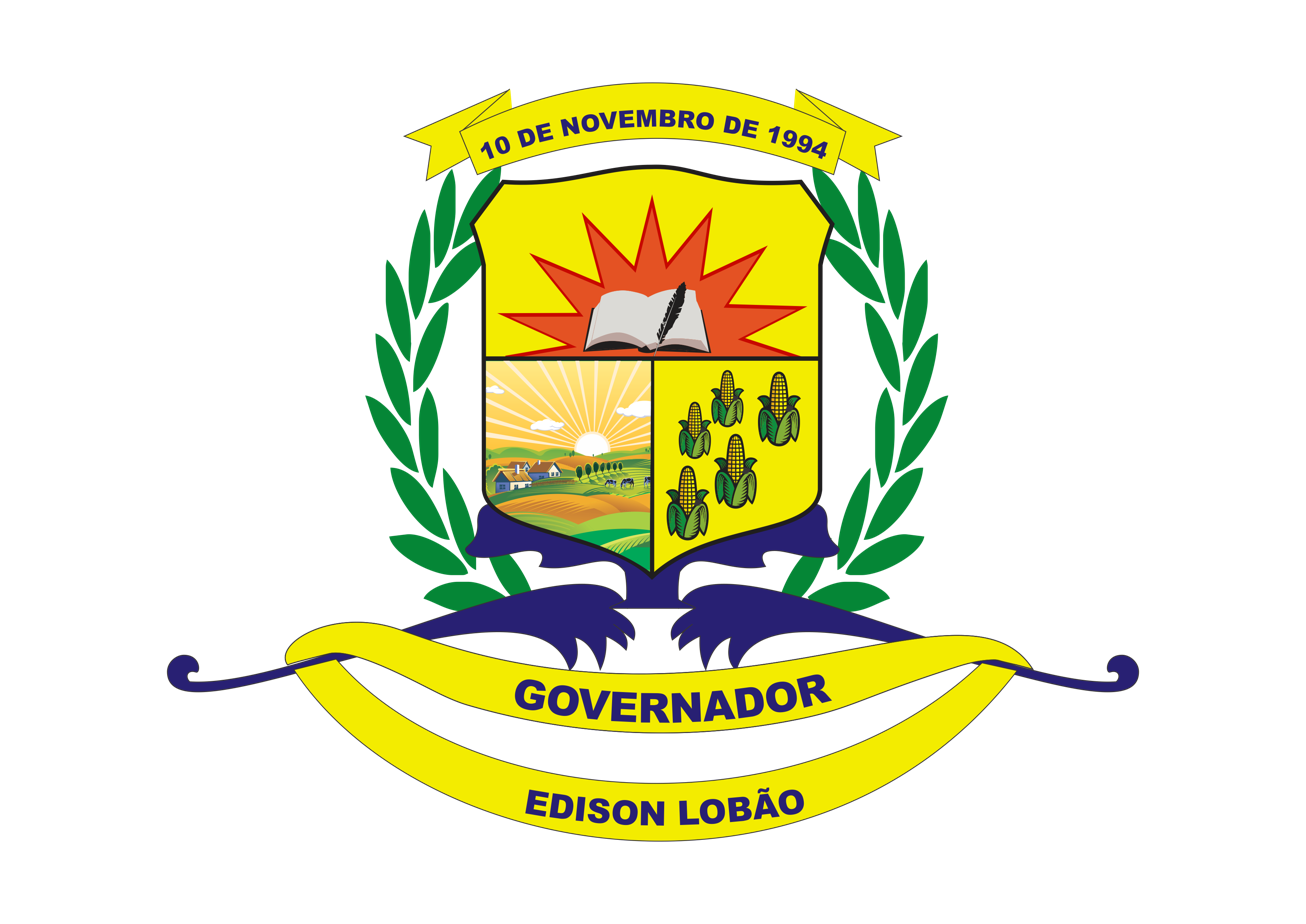
- Flag Coat of arms
- Interactive map of Ribeirãozinho do Maranhão
- Country: Brazil
- Region: Nordeste
- State: Maranhão
- Mesoregion: Oeste Maranhense

Area
  - Total: 238 sq mi (616 km^{2})

Population (2020)
  - Total: 18,520
- Time zone: UTC−3 (BRT)

Ribeirãozinho do Maranhão is a municipality in the state of Maranhão in the Northeast region of Brazil.

== See also ==
- List of municipalities in Maranhão
