= Sucupira do Norte =

Coordinates: 6°27′S 44°12′W

- Municipality
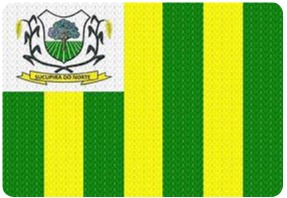
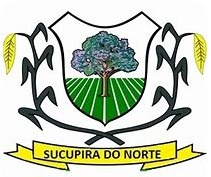
- Flag Coat of arms
- Interactive map of Sucupira do Norte
- Country: Brazil
- Region: Nordeste
- State: Maranhão
- Mesoregion: Leste Maranhense

Population (2020)
  - Total: 10,634
- Time zone: UTC−3 (BRT)

Sucupira do Norte is a municipality in the state of Maranhão in the Northeast region of Brazil.

== See also ==
- List of municipalities in Maranhão
