= Nova Colinas =

Coordinates: 7.11583°S 46.2569°W

- Municipality
- Interactive map of Nova Colinas
- Country: Brazil
- Region: Nordeste
- State: Maranhão
- Mesoregion: Sul Maranhense

Area
  - Total: 287 sq mi (743 km^{2})

Population (2022)
  - Total: 5,021
- Time zone: UTC−3 (BRT)

Nova Colinas is a municipality in the state of Maranhão in the Northeast region of Brazil.

== See also ==
- List of municipalities in Maranhão
