= Milagres do Maranhão =

Coordinates: 3.58083°S 42.6089°W

- Municipality
- Interactive map of Milagres do Maranhão
- Country: Brazil
- Region: Nordeste
- State: Maranhão
- Mesoregion: Leste Maranhense

Population (2020)
  - Total: 8,483
- Time zone: UTC−3 (BRT)

Milagres do Maranhão is a municipality in the state of Maranhão in the Northeast region of Brazil.

== See also ==
- List of municipalities in Maranhão
