= Igarapé Grande =

Municipality in Maranhão, Brazil

Coordinates: 4.585°S 44.8528°W

- Municipality
- Interactive map of Igarapé Grande
- Country: Brazil
- Region: Nordeste
- State: Maranhão
- Mesoregion: Centro Maranhense

Population (2020)
  - Total: 11,387
- Time zone: UTC -3

Igarapé Grande is a municipality in the state of Maranhão in the Northeast region of Brazil.

== See also ==
- List of municipalities in Maranhão
