= Governador Newton Bello =

Coordinates: 3.42583°S 45.6758°W

- Municipality
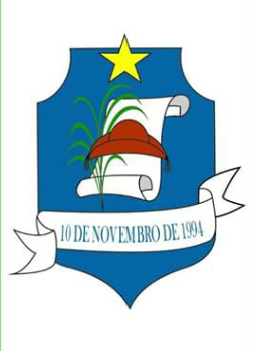
- Coat of arms
- Interactive map of Governador Newton Bello
- Country: Brazil
- Region: Nordeste
- State: Maranhão
- Mesoregion: Oeste Maranhense

Population (2020)
  - Total: 10,151
- Time zone: UTC−3 (BRT)

Governador Newton Bello is a municipality in the state of Maranhão in the Northeast region of Brazil.

== See also ==
- List of municipalities in Maranhão
