= Santa Luzia do Paruá =

Coordinates: 2.62889°S 45.7728°W

- Municipality
- Interactive map of Santa Luzia do Paruá
- Country: Brazil
- Region: Nordeste
- State: Maranhão
- Mesoregion: Oeste Maranhense

Population (2020)
  - Total: 25,371
- Time zone: UTC−3 (BRT)

Santa Luzia do Paruá is a municipality in the state of Maranhão in the Northeast region of Brazil.

== See also ==
- List of municipalities in Maranhão
