= Amapá do Maranhão =

Coordinates: 1.675°S 46.0019°W

- Municipality
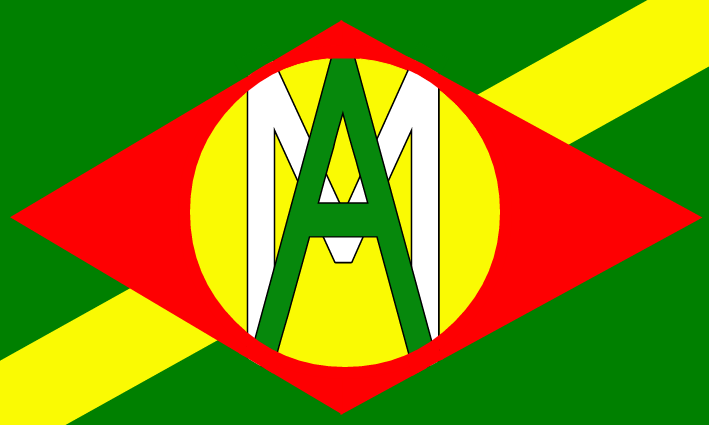
- Flag

- Amapá do Maranhão in Maranhão
- Country: Brazil
- Region: Nordeste
- State: Maranhão
- Mesoregion: Oeste Maranhense
- Established: 10/10/95

Area
  - Total: 170.78 sq mi (442.32 km^{2})

Population (2022)
  - Total: 7,170
- Time zone: UTC−3 (BRT)

Amapá do Maranhão is a municipality in the state of Maranhão in the Northeast region of Brazil.

== See also ==
- List of municipalities in Maranhão
