= Jatobá, Maranhão =

Coordinates: 5.81694°S 44.2228°W

Jatobá
- Municipality
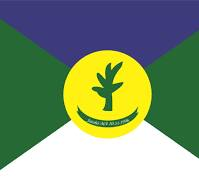
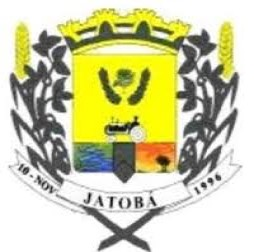
- Flag Coat of arms
- Interactive map of Jatobá
- Country: Brazil
- Region: Nordeste
- State: Maranhão
- Mesoregion: Leste Maranhense

Population (2020)
  - Total: 10,310
- Time zone: UTC−3 (BRT)

Jatobá is a municipality in the state of Maranhão in the Northeast region of Brazil.

== See also ==
- List of municipalities in Maranhão
