= Feira Nova do Maranhão =

Coordinates: 6.96°S 46.6858°W

- Municipality
- Interactive map of Feira Nova do Maranhão
- Country: Brazil
- Region: Nordeste
- State: Maranhão
- Mesoregion: Sul Maranhense

Population (2022)
  - Total: 8,048
- Time zone: UTC−3 (BRT)

Feira Nova do Maranhão is a municipality in the state of Maranhão in the Northeast region of Brazil.

== See also ==
- List of municipalities in Maranhão
