= Miranda do Norte =

Coordinates: 3.56889°S 44.5839°W

- Municipality
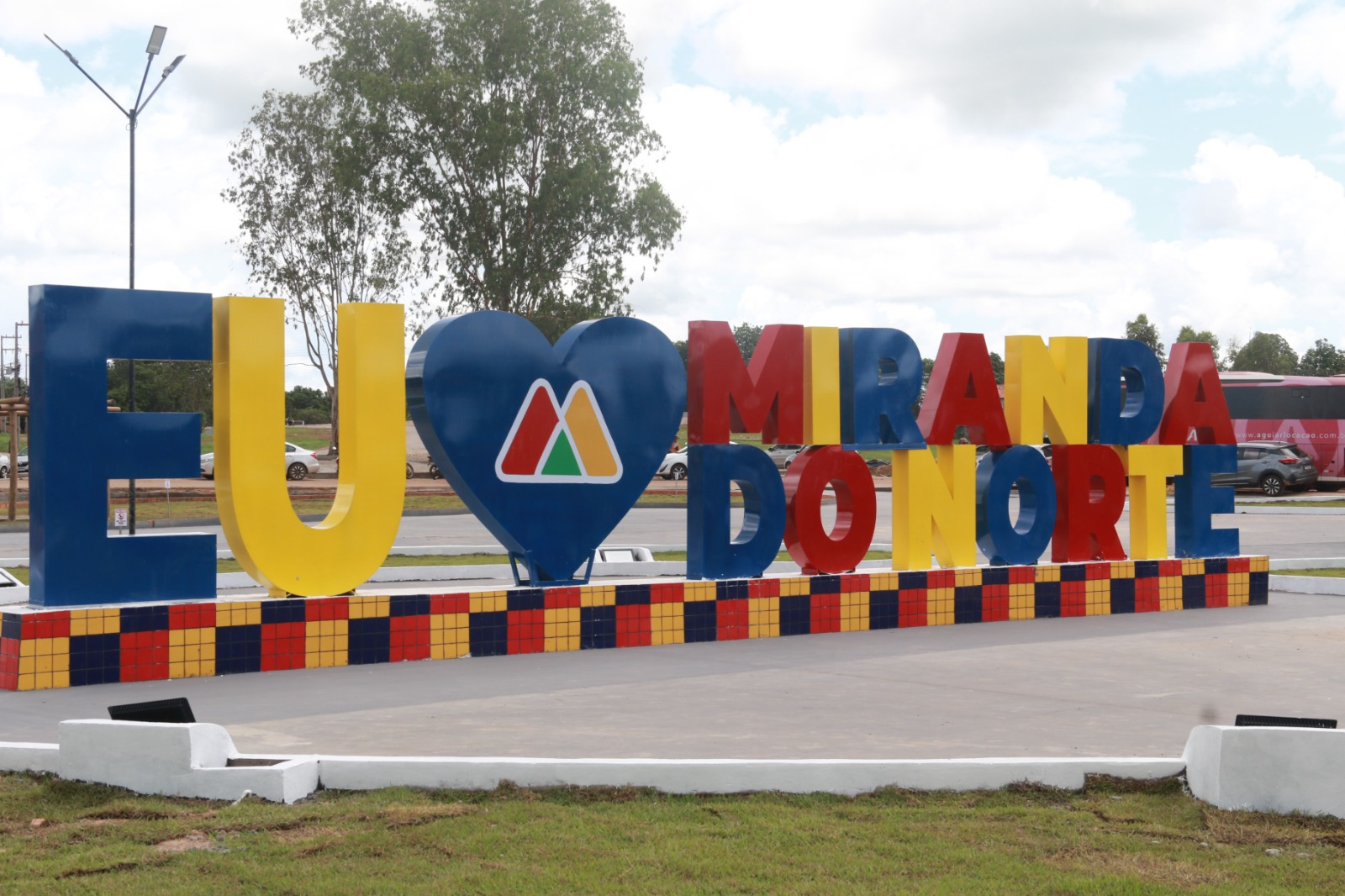
- Miranda do Norte

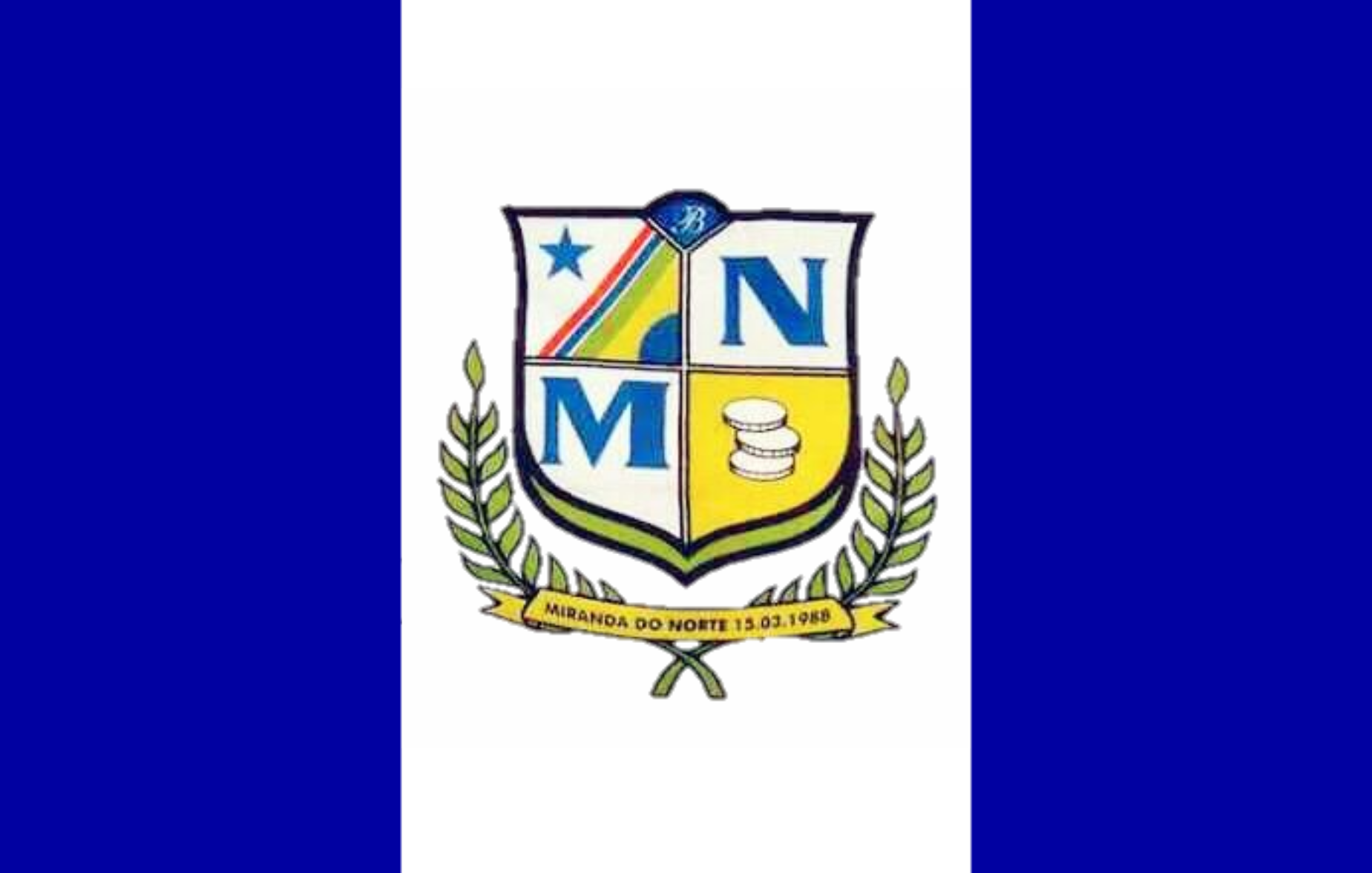
- Flag Coat of arms
- Interactive map of Miranda do Norte
- Country: Brazil
- Region: Nordeste
- State: Maranhão
- Mesoregion: Norte Maranhense

Population (2020)
  - Total: 28,754
- Time zone: UTC−3 (BRT)

Miranda do Norte is a municipality in the state of Maranhão in the Northeast region of Brazil.

== See also ==
- List of municipalities in Maranhão
