= Buriti Bravo =

Coordinates: 5°50′S 43°50′W

- Municipality
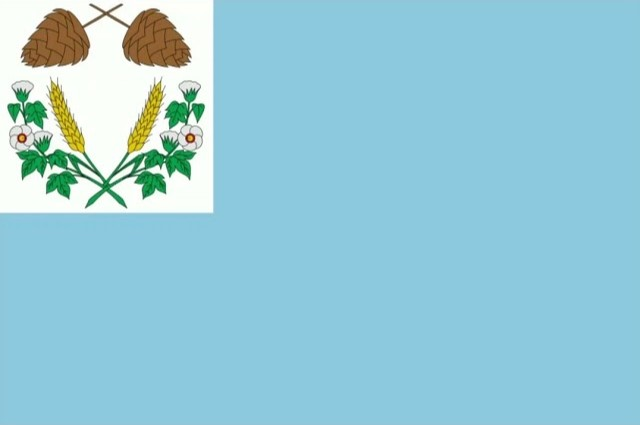
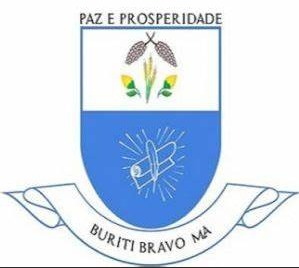
- Flag Coat of arms
- Interactive map of Buriti Bravo
- Country: Brazil
- Region: Nordeste
- State: Maranhão
- Mesoregion: Leste Maranhense

Population (2020)
  - Total: 23,939
- Time zone: UTC−3 (BRT)

Buriti Bravo is a municipality in the state of Maranhão in the Northeast region of Brazil.

== See also ==
- List of municipalities in Maranhão
