= Tufilândia =

Coordinates: 3.72889°S 45.5539°W

- Municipality
- Interactive map of Tufilândia
- Country: Brazil
- Region: Nordeste
- State: Maranhão
- Mesoregion: Oeste Maranhense

Population (2020)
  - Total: 5,854
- Time zone: UTC−3 (BRT)

Tufilândia is a municipality in the state of Maranhão in the Northeast region of Brazil.

== See also ==
- List of municipalities in Maranhão
