= Marajá do Sena =

Coordinates: 4.59889°S 45.5769°W

- Municipality
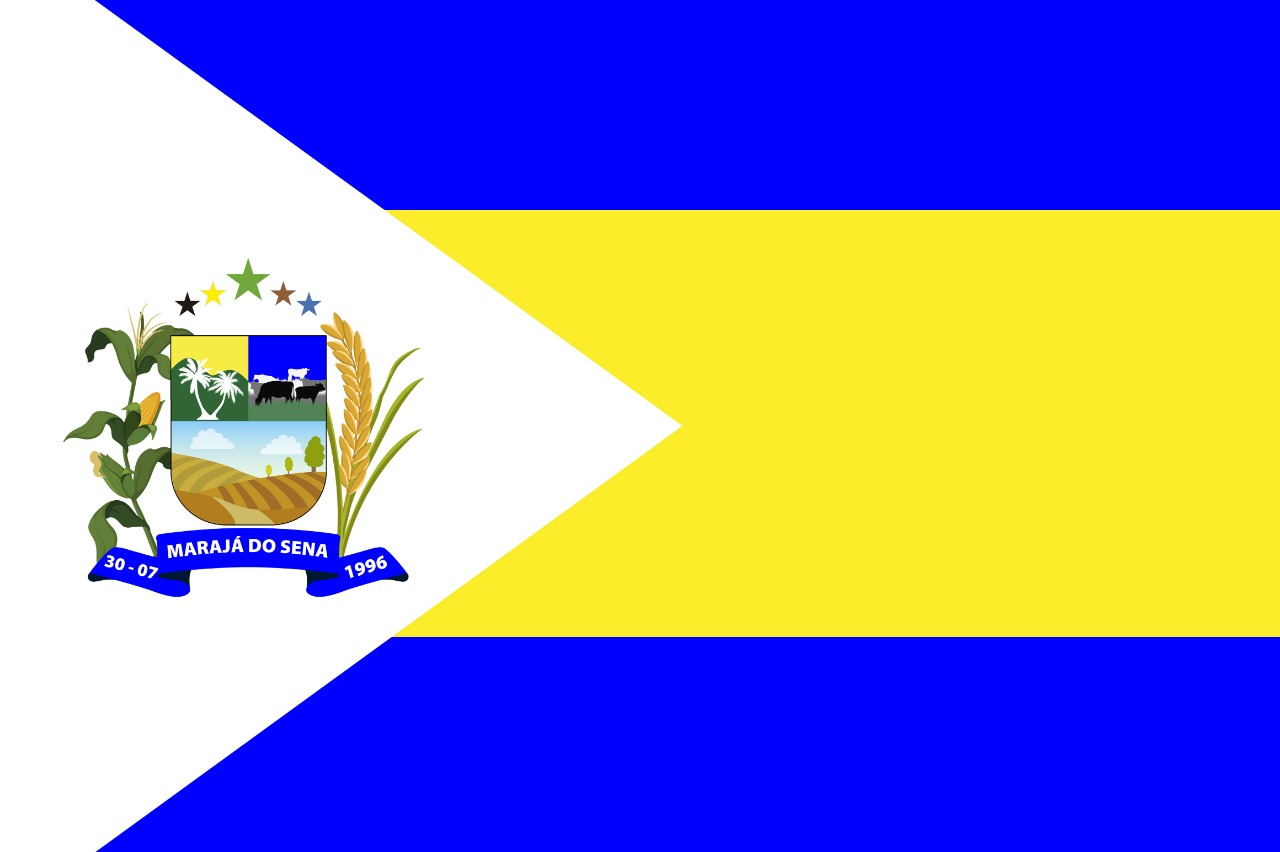
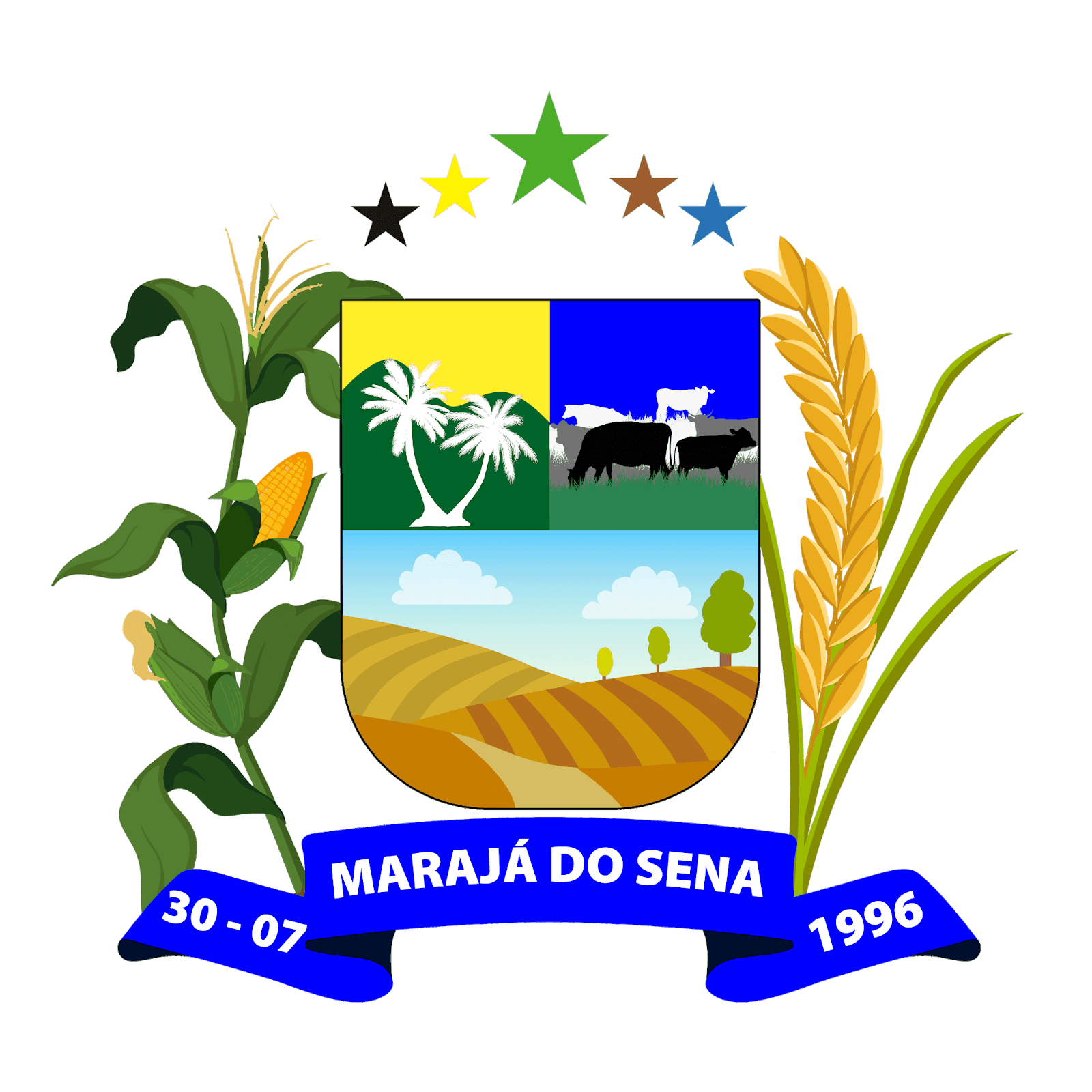
- Flag Coat of arms
- Interactive map of Marajá do Sena
- Country: Brazil
- Region: Nordeste
- State: Maranhão
- Mesoregion: Oeste Maranhense

Population (2020)
  - Total: 7,775
- Time zone: UTC−3 (BRT)

Marajá do Sena is a municipality in the state of Maranhão in the Northeast region of Brazil. The municipality is considered to be the poorest in Maranhão.

== See also ==
- List of municipalities in Maranhão
