= Trizidela do Vale =

Coordinates: 4.53778°S 44.6278°W

- Municipality
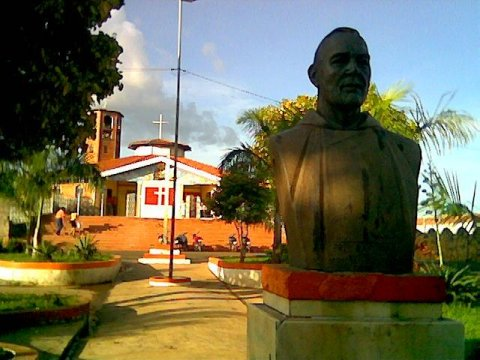
- A photo of Antonio Vale Square with the Church of Santo Antonio de Padua in the background.

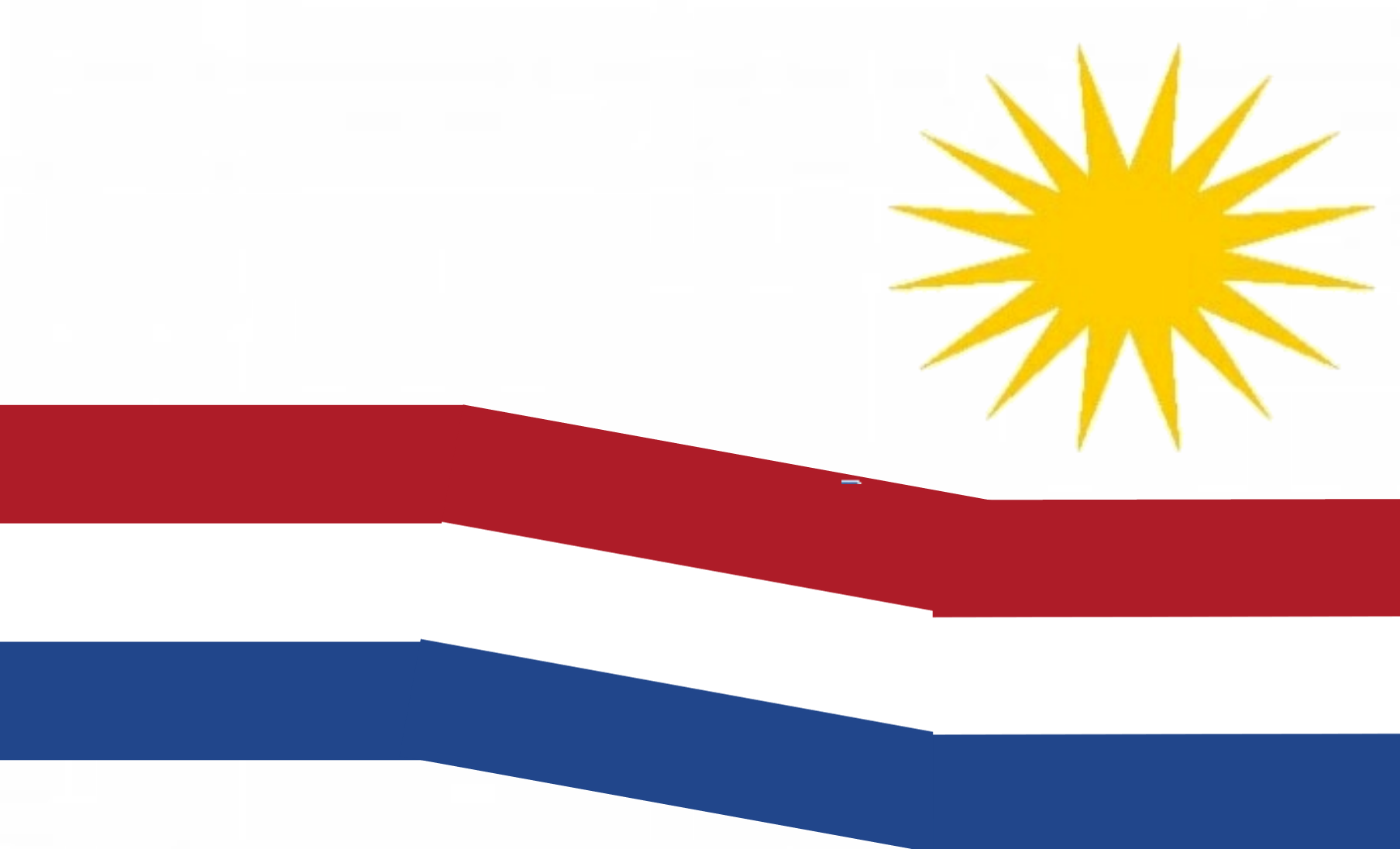
- Flag
- Interactive map of Trizidela do Vale
- Country: Brazil
- Region: Nordeste
- State: Maranhão
- Mesoregion: Centro Maranhense

Population (2020)
  - Total: 22,112
- Time zone: UTC−3 (BRT)

Trizidela do Vale is a municipality in the state of Maranhão in the Northeast region of Brazil.

== See also ==
- List of municipalities in Maranhão
