= Luís Domingues =

- Municipality
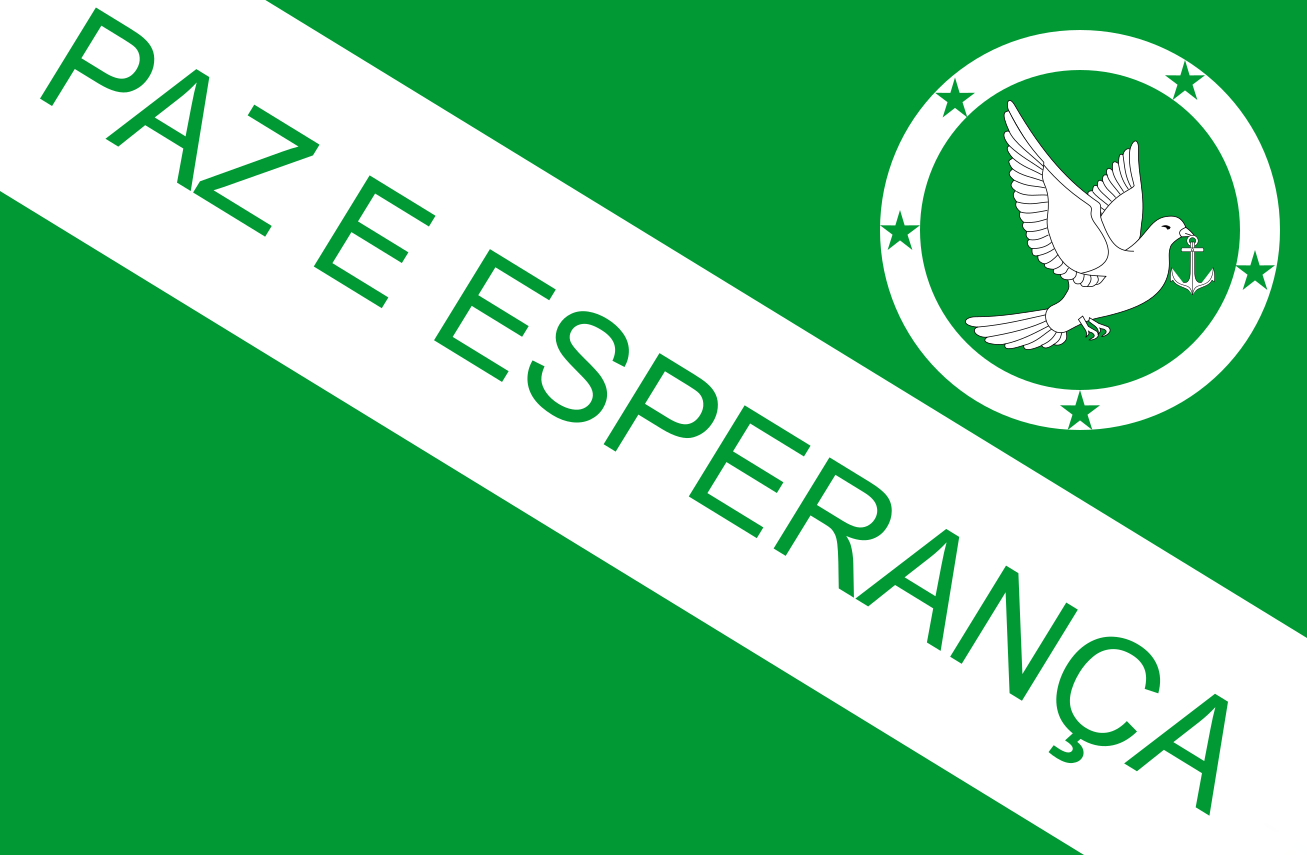
- Flag
- Anthem: "Hymn of Luís Domingues"
- Location in Maranhão state

- Location in Brazil
- Coordinates: 1°18′S 45°52′W
- Country: Brazil
- Region: Northeast
- State: Maranhão

Area
  - Total: 464 km^{2} (179 sq mi)

Population (2020)
  - Total: 6,984
  - Density: 15.1/km^{2} (39.0/sq mi)
- Time zone: UTC−3 (BRT)

Luís Domingues is a Brazilian municipality in the state of Maranhão. Its population is 6,984 (2020) and its area is 464 km^{2}.
