= Governador Archer =

- Municipality
- Location in Maranhão state

- Location in Brazil
- Coordinates: 4°56′S 44°23′W
- Country: Brazil
- Region: Northeast
- State: Maranhão

Area
  - Total: 446 km^{2} (172 sq mi)

Population (2020)
  - Total: 10,886
  - Density: 24.4/km^{2} (63.2/sq mi)
- Time zone: UTC−3 (BRT)

Governador Archer is a Brazilian municipality in the state of Maranhão. Its population is 10,886 (2020) and its total area is 446 km^{2}.
