= List of quilombola communities in Maranhão =

The following is a list of quilombola communities in Maranhão as designated by the Palmares Cultural Foundation and awarded land title by the Instituto Nacional de Colonização e Reforma Agrária through the provisions of the 1988 Constitution. In addition, this list may include territories which received title through state-level agricultural reform agencies. This is not to be confused with the larger list of quilombola communities throughout Brazil, most of which are designated by the Palmares Cultural Foundation but not awarded land title by INCRA or equivalent state agencies.

== List of communities ==
Region	State	Municipality	Quilombola community
Northeast	MA	Alcântara	Águas Belas (Apicum Grande, Arenhengaua, Bacanga, Bacuriajuba, Baixa Grande I, Baixa Grande Ii, Baixo do Grilo, Baracatatiua, Barreiros, Bebedouro, Bejú-Açu, Belém, Boa Vista I, Boa Vista Ii, Boa Vista Iii, Boca do Rio, Bom de Viver, Bom Jardim, Bordão, Brito I, Caçador, Caicaua I, Caicaua Ii, Cajapari, Cajatiua, Cajiba, Capijuba, Cajueiro Ii, Camirim, Canavieira, Canelatiua, Capim Açu, Capoteiro, Caratatiua, Castelo, Cavem Ii, Centro da Eulália, Conceição, Coqueiro, Corre Fresco, Cujupe I, Cujupe Ii, Curuçá I, Engenho I, Esperança, Florida, Fora Cativeiro, Guanda I, Guanda Ii, Iguaiba, Ilha da Camboa, Iririzal, Iscoito, Itaperaí, Itapiranga, Itapuaua, Itauaú, Jacaré I, Jacroa, Janã, Jarucaia, Jordoa, Ladeira Ii, Lago, Macajubal I, Macajubal Ii, Mãe Eugênia, Mamona I, Mamona Ii, Mangueiral, Manival, Maracati, Maria Preta, Marinheiro, Marmorana, Mato Grosso, Murari, Mutiti, Nova Espera, Nova Ponta Seca, Novo Cajueiro, Novo Maruda, Novo Pepital, Novo Peru, Novo Só Assim, Oitiua, Pacatiua, Pacuri, Palmeiras, Paquativa, Pavão, Peri Açu, Perizinho, Peroba de Baixo, Peroba de Cima, Piquia, Ponta d'Areia, Porto da Cinza, Porto de Baixo, Porto de Cabloco, Porto do Boi I, Praia de Baixo, Prainha, Primirim, Quiriritiua, Raposa, Rasgado, Retiro, Rio Grande I, Rio Grande Ii, Rio Verde, Salina, Samucangaua, Santa Bárbara, Santa Helena, Santa Luzia, Santa Maria, Santa Rita I, Santa Rita Ii, Santana dos Cablocos, Santo Inácio, São Benedito I, São Benedito Ii, São Benedito Iii, São Francisco I, São Francisco Ii, São João de Cortes, São José, São Lourenço, São Maurício, São Paulo, São Raimundo Ii, São Raimundo Iii, Segurado, Tacaua I, Tapicuem (Itapecuem), Tapuio, Tatuoca, Taturoca, Terra Mole, Terra Nova, Timbotuba, Tiquaras Ii, Trajano, Trapucara, Traquai, Vai Com Deus, Vila Itaperaí, Vila Maranhense, Vila Nova I (Vila do Meio), Vila Nova Ii e Vista Alegre)
Northeast	MA	Alcântara	Ilha do Cajual
Northeast	MA	Alcântara	Itamatatiua
Northeast	MA	Alcântara	Santo Inácio e Castelo
Northeast	MA	Alcântara	São Maurício
Northeast	MA	Alto Alegre do Maranhão	Marmorana/ Boa Hora 3
Northeast	MA	Alto Alegre do Maranhão	Sao José
Northeast	MA	Alto Parnaíba	Macacos, Brejim e Curupá
Northeast	MA	Anajatuba	Assuntinga
Northeast	MA	Anajatuba	Bairro São Benedito
Northeast	MA	Anajatuba	Bom Jardim
Northeast	MA	Anajatuba	Carro Quebrado
Northeast	MA	Anajatuba	Centro de Isidório
Northeast	MA	Anajatuba	Cumbi
Northeast	MA	Anajatuba	Cupauba
Northeast	MA	Anajatuba	Flexeira
Northeast	MA	Anajatuba	Ilhas do Teso
Northeast	MA	Anajatuba	Ladeira
Northeast	MA	Anajatuba	Pedrinhas
Northeast	MA	Anajatuba	Ponta Bonita
Northeast	MA	Anajatuba	Povoado Quebra e Capim
Northeast	MA	Anajatuba	Povoado Retiro
Northeast	MA	Anajatuba	São José e Zé Bernardo
Northeast	MA	Anajatuba	São Pedro
Northeast	MA	Anajatuba	São Roque
Northeast	MA	Anajatuba	Teso Grande
Northeast	MA	Anajatuba, Itapecuru-Mirim	Monge Belo (Ponta Grossa, Juçara, Jaibara dos Rodrigues, Teso da Tapera e Frades)
Northeast	MA	Anajatuba, Itapecuru-Mirim	Queluz
Northeast	MA	Axixá	Burgos
Northeast	MA	Axixá	Centro Grande
Northeast	MA	Axixá	Munim Mirim
Northeast	MA	Bacabal	Campo Redondo
Northeast	MA	Bacabal	Catucá
Northeast	MA	Bacabal	Guaraciaba
Northeast	MA	Bacabal	Piratininga
Northeast	MA	Bacabal	São Sebastião dos Pretos
Northeast	MA	Bacabeira	Engenho
Northeast	MA	Bacuri	Águas Bela
Northeast	MA	Bacuri	Barreira
Northeast	MA	Bacuri	Bate Pé
Northeast	MA	Bacuri	Bitiua
Northeast	MA	Bacuri	Estiva de Gado
Northeast	MA	Bacuri	Estrada Nova
Northeast	MA	Bacuri	Jurupiranga
Northeast	MA	Bacuri	Matinha
Northeast	MA	Bacuri	Mutaca
Northeast	MA	Bacuri	Ponta Seca
Northeast	MA	Bacuri	Santa Rosa
Northeast	MA	Bacuri	São Félix
Northeast	MA	Bacuri	Vila Nova
Northeast	MA	Bacurituba	Beira de Costa
Northeast	MA	Bacurituba	Chapada do Boqueirão
Northeast	MA	Bacurituba	Prazeres
Northeast	MA	Bacurituba	Santa Maria
Northeast	MA	Bacurituba	Serejo
Northeast	MA	Bacurituba	Tucum
Northeast	MA	Barreirinhas	Cabeceira do Centro
Northeast	MA	Barreirinhas	Cantinho
Northeast	MA	Barreirinhas	Fura Braço
Northeast	MA	Barreirinhas	Marcelino
Northeast	MA	Barreirinhas	Santa Cruz
Northeast	MA	Barreirinhas	Santa Maria Ii
Northeast	MA	Barreirinhas	Santa Rita
Northeast	MA	Barreirinhas	Santo Antônio
Northeast	MA	Bequimão	Ariquipá
Northeast	MA	Bequimão	Conceição
Northeast	MA	Bequimão	Juraraitá
Northeast	MA	Bequimão	Mafra
Northeast	MA	Bequimão	Marajá
Northeast	MA	Bequimão	Pericumã
Northeast	MA	Bequimão	Ramal de Quindíua
Northeast	MA	Bequimão	Rio Grande
Northeast	MA	Bequimão	Santa Rita
Northeast	MA	Bequimão	Sassuy
Northeast	MA	Bequimão	Sibéria
Northeast	MA	Brejo	Alto Bonito
Northeast	MA	Brejo	Árvores Verdes e Estreito
Northeast	MA	Brejo	Bandeira
Northeast	MA	Brejo	Boa Esperança
Northeast	MA	Brejo	Boa Vista
Northeast	MA	Brejo	Boca da Mata e Criulis
Northeast	MA	Brejo	Bom Princípio
Northeast	MA	Brejo	Depósito
Northeast	MA	Brejo	Faveira
Northeast	MA	Brejo	Funil
Northeast	MA	Brejo	Saco das Almas
Northeast	MA	Brejo	Santa Alice
Northeast	MA	Brejo	São Bento
Northeast	MA	Buriti	Pitombeira
Northeast	MA	Buriti	Santa Cruz
Northeast	MA	Buriti	São José
Northeast	MA	Cajapió	João Ganga
Northeast	MA	Cajapió	Pedreiras
Northeast	MA	Cajapió	Picadas
Northeast	MA	Cajapió	Posto Seleção
Northeast	MA	Cajapió	São Lourenço
Northeast	MA	Cajari	Boa Vista
Northeast	MA	Cajari	Bolonha
Northeast	MA	Cajari	Camaputiua
Northeast	MA	Cajari	Flexal e Retiro
Northeast	MA	Cajari	Santa Maria
Northeast	MA	Cajari	São José de Belino
Northeast	MA	Cândido Mendes	Bom Jesus dos Pretos
Northeast	MA	Cândido Mendes	Santa Izabel
Northeast	MA	Cantanhede	Bacuri dos Pires
Northeast	MA	Cantanhede	Tambá, Livramento, Corrente e Cajueiro
Northeast	MA	Capinzal do Norte	Fundamento
Northeast	MA	Capinzal do Norte	Ipiranga
Northeast	MA	Capinzal do Norte	Santa Cruz
Northeast	MA	Capinzal do Norte, Codó	Matões dos Moreira
Northeast	MA	Capinzal do Norte, Peritoró	Pitoró dos Pretos
Northeast	MA	Caxias	Cana Brava das Moças
Northeast	MA	Caxias	Jenipapo
Northeast	MA	Caxias	Lagoa dos Pretos e Centro da Lagoa
Northeast	MA	Caxias	Lavra
Northeast	MA	Caxias	Mimoso
Northeast	MA	Caxias	Soledade
Northeast	MA	Cedral	Canavial
Northeast	MA	Cedral	Engole
Northeast	MA	Cedral	Itajuba
Northeast	MA	Cedral	Maranhão Novo
Northeast	MA	Cedral	Pericaua
Northeast	MA	Cedral	Santo Antônio
Northeast	MA	Central do Maranhão	Angelim
Northeast	MA	Central do Maranhão	Boa Vista
Northeast	MA	Central do Maranhão	Estiva Ii
Northeast	MA	Central do Maranhão	Monte Cristo
Northeast	MA	Central do Maranhão	São Jose do Lugar
Northeast	MA	Chapadinha	Barro Vermelho
Northeast	MA	Chapadinha	Poço de Pedra
Northeast	MA	Chapadinha	Prata dos Quirinos
Northeast	MA	Chapadinha	Vargem do Forno
Northeast	MA	Codó	Bom Jesus
Northeast	MA	Codó	Cipoal dos Pretos
Northeast	MA	Codó	Eira dos Coqueiros
Northeast	MA	Codó	Mata Virgem
Northeast	MA	Codó	Monte Cristo e Matuzinho
Northeast	MA	Codó	Puraquê
Northeast	MA	Codó	Santa Joana
Northeast	MA	Codó	Santo Antônio dos Pretos
Northeast	MA	Codó	São Benedito dos Colocados
Northeast	MA	Codó	Sete
Northeast	MA	Codó	Três Irmãos, Montabarri e Queimadas
Northeast	MA	Colinas	Cambirimba
Northeast	MA	Colinas	Jaguarana
Northeast	MA	Colinas	Peixes
Northeast	MA	Colinas	Taboca do Belém
Northeast	MA	Cururupu	Acre
Northeast	MA	Cururupu	Aliança
Northeast	MA	Cururupu	Alto Brasil / Boa Vista
Northeast	MA	Cururupu	Ceará
Northeast	MA	Cururupu	Conceição, Estivinha e Vila Paris
Northeast	MA	Cururupu	Condurús
Northeast	MA	Cururupu	Entre Rios
Northeast	MA	Cururupu	Fortaleza
Northeast	MA	Cururupu	Oiteiro
Northeast	MA	Cururupu	Rio de Pedras
Northeast	MA	Cururupu	Rumo
Northeast	MA	Cururupu	Santa Rita
Northeast	MA	Dom Pedro	Cruzeiro
Northeast	MA	Fernando Falcão	Sítio dos Arrudas
Northeast	MA	Fortuna	Alta Floresta do Povoado Caiçara
Northeast	MA	Grajaú	Santo Antônio dos Pretos
Northeast	MA	Guimarães	Baiacú
Northeast	MA	Guimarães	Carapirá
Northeast	MA	Guimarães	Cumum
Northeast	MA	Guimarães	Damásio
Northeast	MA	Guimarães	Lago do Sapateiro
Northeast	MA	Guimarães	Macajubal
Northeast	MA	Guimarães	Porto das Cabeceiras
Northeast	MA	Guimarães	Porto de Baixo
Northeast	MA	Guimarães	Povoado de Guarimandiua
Northeast	MA	Guimarães	Santa Rita dos Cardosos
Northeast	MA	Guimarães	São Benedito do Caratiua
Northeast	MA	Guimarães	São José dos Pretos
Northeast	MA	Guimarães	São Vicente
Northeast	MA	Icatu	Boca da Mata
Northeast	MA	Icatu	Bom Sucesso
Northeast	MA	Icatu	Boqueirão
Northeast	MA	Icatu	Jacareí dos Pretos
Northeast	MA	Icatu	Maruim
Northeast	MA	Icatu	Papagaio
Northeast	MA	Icatu	Povoado Ananás
Northeast	MA	Icatu	Povoado de Retiro
Northeast	MA	Icatu	Quartéis
Northeast	MA	Icatu	Região da Fazenda
Northeast	MA	Icatu	Santa Maria
Northeast	MA	Icatu	Santo Antônio dos Caboclos
Northeast	MA	Icatu	Timbotitua
Northeast	MA	Igarapé do Meio	Jutaí
Northeast	MA	Itapecuru-Mirim	Brasilina
Northeast	MA	Itapecuru-Mirim	Buragir
Northeast	MA	Itapecuru-Mirim	Campo Rio
Northeast	MA	Itapecuru-Mirim	Canta Galo
Northeast	MA	Itapecuru-Mirim	Contendas
Northeast	MA	Itapecuru-Mirim	Corrente Ii
Northeast	MA	Itapecuru-Mirim	Curitiba
Northeast	MA	Itapecuru-Mirim	Curitiba e Mirim
Northeast	MA	Itapecuru-Mirim	Curupati
Northeast	MA	Itapecuru-Mirim	Dois Mil
Northeast	MA	Itapecuru-Mirim	Estopa
Northeast	MA	Itapecuru-Mirim	Filipa
Northeast	MA	Itapecuru-Mirim	Ipiranga do Carmina
Northeast	MA	Itapecuru-Mirim	Jacaré
Northeast	MA	Itapecuru-Mirim	Jaibara dos Rodrigues
Northeast	MA	Itapecuru-Mirim	Magnificat/Barriguda
Northeast	MA	Itapecuru-Mirim	Mata de São Benedito
Northeast	MA	Itapecuru-Mirim	Mato Alagado I
Northeast	MA	Itapecuru-Mirim	Mirim
Northeast	MA	Itapecuru-Mirim	Monte Alegre
Northeast	MA	Itapecuru-Mirim	Monte Lindo Ii
Northeast	MA	Itapecuru-Mirim	Moreira
Northeast	MA	Itapecuru-Mirim	Nossa Senhora Aparecida
Northeast	MA	Itapecuru-Mirim	Nossa Senhora do Rosário
Northeast	MA	Itapecuru-Mirim	Oiteiro dos Nogueiras
Northeast	MA	Itapecuru-Mirim	Pau Nascido
Northeast	MA	Itapecuru-Mirim	Piqui e Santa Maria dos Pretos
Northeast	MA	Itapecuru-Mirim	Povoado Benfica
Northeast	MA	Itapecuru-Mirim	Povoado Cachoeira
Northeast	MA	Itapecuru-Mirim	Povoado de Pulgão
Northeast	MA	Itapecuru-Mirim	Povoado Javi
Northeast	MA	Itapecuru-Mirim	Povoado Mata Iii
Northeast	MA	Itapecuru-Mirim	Santa Helena
Northeast	MA	Itapecuru-Mirim	Santa Maria dos Pinheiros
Northeast	MA	Itapecuru-Mirim	Santa Rita dos Gouveias
Northeast	MA	Itapecuru-Mirim	Santa Rosa dos Pretos (Santa Rosa dos Pretos, Barreira Funda, Sítio Velho, Curva de Santana, Alto São João, Picos I, Picos Ii, Pindaíba, Fazenda Nova, Colégio, Centro de Aguida, Matão Velho, Boa Vista, Barreira, Pirinã, Kelru, Conceição, Fugido, Leiro e Tingidor do Campo)
Northeast	MA	Itapecuru-Mirim	Santana e São Patrício
Northeast	MA	Itapecuru-Mirim	São Bento
Northeast	MA	Itapecuru-Mirim	São João do Povoado Mata
Northeast	MA	Itapecuru-Mirim	São José dos Matos
Northeast	MA	Itapecuru-Mirim	São Pedro
Northeast	MA	Itapecuru-Mirim	Satubinha
Northeast	MA	Itapecuru-Mirim	Sumaúma
Northeast	MA	Itapecuru-Mirim	Terra Preta
Northeast	MA	Itapecuru-Mirim	Tingidor
Northeast	MA	Itapecuru-Mirim	Vista Alegre
Northeast	MA	Itapecuru-Mirim	Jaibara dos Nogueiras
Northeast	MA	Lima Campos	Bom Jesus dos Pretos
Northeast	MA	Lima Campos	Morada Nova
Northeast	MA	Lima Campos	Nova Luz
Northeast	MA	Lima Campos	Nova Olinda
Northeast	MA	Lima Campos	Queto
Northeast	MA	Lima Campos	Santo Antônio dos Sardinhas
Northeast	MA	Lima Campos	São Domingos
Northeast	MA	Lima Campos	São Francisco
Northeast	MA	Mata Roma	Bom Sucesso dos Negros
Northeast	MA	Matinha	Alto da Pedra
Northeast	MA	Matinha	Bom Jesus
Northeast	MA	Matinha	Cajá
Northeast	MA	Matinha	Caranguejo
Northeast	MA	Matinha	Curral de Varas
Northeast	MA	Matinha	Cutia I
Northeast	MA	Matinha	Cutia Ii
Northeast	MA	Matinha	Enseada Grande
Northeast	MA	Matinha	Faixa
Northeast	MA	Matinha	Graça
Northeast	MA	Matinha	Itapera
Northeast	MA	Matinha	Jacuica
Northeast	MA	Matinha	Mó São Caetano
Northeast	MA	Matinha	Os Paulos
Northeast	MA	Matinha	Palestina
Northeast	MA	Matinha	Povoado João Luís
Northeast	MA	Matinha	Preguiça Nova
Northeast	MA	Matinha	Preguiça Velha
Northeast	MA	Matinha	Santa Izabel
Northeast	MA	Matinha	Santa Maria
Northeast	MA	Matinha	São Felipe
Northeast	MA	Matinha	São Francisco
Northeast	MA	Matinha	São José do Bruno
Northeast	MA	Matinha	Tanque de Valença
Northeast	MA	Matões	Assuviante
Northeast	MA	Matões	Mandacaru dos Pretos
Northeast	MA	Matões	Tanque da Rodagem
Northeast	MA	Matões do Norte	Lago do Coco
Northeast	MA	Matões do Norte	Santo Antônio
Northeast	MA	Miranda do Norte	Joaquim Maria
Northeast	MA	Mirinzal	Achuí
Northeast	MA	Mirinzal	Bom Viver
Northeast	MA	Mirinzal	Colônia
Northeast	MA	Mirinzal	Engenho do Meio
Northeast	MA	Mirinzal	Estiva dos Mafras
Northeast	MA	Mirinzal	Frechal
Northeast	MA	Mirinzal	Graça de Deus
Northeast	MA	Mirinzal	Gurutil
Northeast	MA	Mirinzal	Maiabi
Northeast	MA	Mirinzal	Mata de Pantaleão
Northeast	MA	Mirinzal	Mondêgo
Northeast	MA	Mirinzal	Paraíso e Anajasau
Northeast	MA	Mirinzal	Porto do Nascimento
Northeast	MA	Mirinzal	Rio do Curral
Northeast	MA	Mirinzal	Santa Joana
Northeast	MA	Mirinzal	Santa Tereza
Northeast	MA	Mirinzal	Santiago
Northeast	MA	Monção	Castelo
Northeast	MA	Monção	Mata Boi
Northeast	MA	Monção	Outeiro
Northeast	MA	Nina Rodrigues	Amapá dos Catarinos
Northeast	MA	Nina Rodrigues	Amapá dos Lucindos
Northeast	MA	Nina Rodrigues	Ilha
Northeast	MA	Nina Rodrigues	Malhadalta de Adão
Northeast	MA	Nova Olinda do Maranhão	Olho d'Água
Northeast	MA	Olinda Nova do Maranhão	Ramal de Ludigerio
Northeast	MA	Olinda Nova do Maranhão	Caldo Quente
Northeast	MA	Olinda Nova do Maranhão	Crispiana
Northeast	MA	Olinda Nova do Maranhão	Curva da Mangueira
Northeast	MA	Olinda Nova do Maranhão	Curva de Ascêncio
Northeast	MA	Olinda Nova do Maranhão	São Benedito dos Carneiros
Northeast	MA	Palmeirândia	Cruzeiro
Northeast	MA	Palmeirândia	Enseada dos Nogueiras
Northeast	MA	Palmeirândia	Vila Nova
Northeast	MA	Parnarama	Brejo de São Félix
Northeast	MA	Parnarama	Cocalinho
Northeast	MA	Parnarama	Guerreiro
Northeast	MA	Pastos Bons	Cascavel
Northeast	MA	Pastos Bons	Jacú
Northeast	MA	Paulino Neves	Canto do Lago
Northeast	MA	Pedreiras	Lago da Onça
Northeast	MA	Pedro do Rosário	Barro Ponta da Formiga, Santa Maria e Área Comunitária
Northeast	MA	Pedro do Rosário	Boa Fé
Northeast	MA	Pedro do Rosário	Bornéu
Northeast	MA	Pedro do Rosário	Imbiral Cabeça Branca
Northeast	MA	Pedro do Rosário	Pedreiras
Northeast	MA	Pedro do Rosário	Rio dos Peixes
Northeast	MA	Pedro do Rosário	Santo Inácio
Northeast	MA	Pedro do Rosário	São João dos Campos
Northeast	MA	Penalva	Alto Bonito
Northeast	MA	Penalva	Caminho Novo e Formiga
Northeast	MA	Penalva	Cedreiro e Simauma
Northeast	MA	Penalva	Gapó
Northeast	MA	Penalva	Ponta do Curral
Northeast	MA	Penalva	Santa Rita
Northeast	MA	Penalva	Santo Antônio
Northeast	MA	Penalva	São José
Northeast	MA	Penalva	São Miguel do Povoado Querés
Northeast	MA	Penalva	Sãojoaquim e São Joaquinzinho
Northeast	MA	Peri Mirim	Capoeira Grande
Northeast	MA	Peri Mirim	Itaquipé
Northeast	MA	Peri Mirim	Malhada dos Pretos
Northeast	MA	Peri Mirim	Pericumã
Northeast	MA	Peri Mirim	Rio da Prata
Northeast	MA	Peri Mirim	Santa Cruz
Northeast	MA	Peri Mirim	Tijuca
Northeast	MA	Peri-Mirim	Povoado Pedrinhas
Northeast	MA	Peritoró	Lago Grande
Northeast	MA	Peritoró	Resfriado
Northeast	MA	Peritoró	São Benedito do Elcias
Northeast	MA	Pinheiro	Alto dos Pretos
Northeast	MA	Pinheiro	Belo Monte
Northeast	MA	Pinheiro	Bem Fica
Northeast	MA	Pinheiro	Boa Vista
Northeast	MA	Pinheiro	Cuba
Northeast	MA	Pinheiro	Espírito Santo e Lacral
Northeast	MA	Pinheiro	Guaribal
Northeast	MA	Pinheiro	Oiteiro
Northeast	MA	Pinheiro	Pacoã
Northeast	MA	Pinheiro	Pirinã
Northeast	MA	Pinheiro	Povoado São Paulo Gama
Northeast	MA	Pinheiro	Proteção
Northeast	MA	Pinheiro	Queimada de João
Northeast	MA	Pinheiro	Rio dos Peixes
Northeast	MA	Pinheiro	Santa Maria
Northeast	MA	Pinheiro	Santa Rosa
Northeast	MA	Pinheiro	Santa Vitória do Gama
Northeast	MA	Pinheiro	Santana dos Pretos
Northeast	MA	Pinheiro	Sudário
Northeast	MA	Pinheiro	Tatuzinho
Northeast	MA	Pirapemas	Aldeia Velha (Pontes, Salgado, Santo Onório, Bica, Leão, Parnamirim, Panaca, São Benedito dos Pretos, Afoga Bode, Centrinho e Vista Alegre)
Northeast	MA	Porto Rico do Maranhão	Engenho do Lago
Northeast	MA	Porto Rico do Maranhão	Sumaúma
Northeast	MA	Presidente Juscelino	Mirinzal
Northeast	MA	Presidente Juscelino	Povoado São Lourenço e Lagoinha
Northeast	MA	Presidente Sarney	Bebe Fumo
Northeast	MA	Presidente Sarney	Bem Posta
Northeast	MA	Presidente Sarney	Brito
Northeast	MA	Presidente Sarney	Centrinho, Passa Bem e Pirinã
Northeast	MA	Presidente Sarney	Cocal
Northeast	MA	Presidente Sarney	Jericó
Northeast	MA	Presidente Sarney	Mato do Brito
Northeast	MA	Presidente Sarney	Quatro Bocas
Northeast	MA	Presidente Sarney	Santa Maria
Northeast	MA	Presidente Sarney	Santa Rita
Northeast	MA	Presidente Sarney	São Felipe
Northeast	MA	Presidente Vargas	Boa Hora
Northeast	MA	Presidente Vargas	Boa Hora do Puluca
Northeast	MA	Presidente Vargas	Boa Hora I
Northeast	MA	Presidente Vargas	Bom Jardim da Beira
Northeast	MA	Presidente Vargas	Cavianã
Northeast	MA	Presidente Vargas	Cigana Grande
Northeast	MA	Presidente Vargas	Estiva dos Cotós
Northeast	MA	Presidente Vargas	Filomena
Northeast	MA	Presidente Vargas	Finca Pé
Northeast	MA	Presidente Vargas	Fincapé I
Northeast	MA	Presidente Vargas	Lagoa Grande
Northeast	MA	Presidente Vargas	Pução
Northeast	MA	Presidente Vargas	Sapucaial
Northeast	MA	Primeira Cruz	Santo Antônio dos Pretos
Northeast	MA	Rosário	Boa Vista
Northeast	MA	Rosário	Iguaraçu
Northeast	MA	Rosário	Miranda
Northeast	MA	Rosário	Paissandu e Reforma
Northeast	MA	Rosário	São Miguel
Northeast	MA	Rosário, Santa Rita	Santana
Northeast	MA	Santa Helena	Aranha
Northeast	MA	Santa Helena	Armíndio
Northeast	MA	Santa Helena	Bacuri
Northeast	MA	Santa Helena	Bem Fica
Northeast	MA	Santa Helena	Boi do Carro
Northeast	MA	Santa Helena	Bom Que Dói e Faxina
Northeast	MA	Santa Helena	Chapadinha
Northeast	MA	Santa Helena	Curralzinho
Northeast	MA	Santa Helena	Janaubeira
Northeast	MA	Santa Helena	Mundico
Northeast	MA	Santa Helena	Oiteiro Grande
Northeast	MA	Santa Helena	Pau Pombo
Northeast	MA	Santa Helena	Povoado de Vivo
Northeast	MA	Santa Helena	Santa Luzia
Northeast	MA	Santa Helena	Santa Severa e São Roque
Northeast	MA	Santa Helena	São Bento
Northeast	MA	Santa Helena	São Raimundo
Northeast	MA	Santa Inês	Cuba
Northeast	MA	Santa Inês	Marfim
Northeast	MA	Santa Inês	Povoado Onça
Northeast	MA	Santa Quitéria do Maranhão	Cana Brava
Northeast	MA	Santa Rita	Cajueiro
Northeast	MA	Santa Rita	Careminha
Northeast	MA	Santa Rita	Cariongo
Northeast	MA	Santa Rita	Cedro
Northeast	MA	Santa Rita	Centro dos Violas
Northeast	MA	Santa Rita	Ilha das Pedras
Northeast	MA	Santa Rita	Jiquiri e São Raimundo
Northeast	MA	Santa Rita	Maniva
Northeast	MA	Santa Rita	Morada Nova
Northeast	MA	Santa Rita	Nossa Senhora da Conceição
Northeast	MA	Santa Rita	Povoado de Santa Luzia
Northeast	MA	Santa Rita	Povoado Pedreiras
Northeast	MA	Santa Rita	Santa Luzia
Northeast	MA	Santa Rita	Santa Rita do Vale
Northeast	MA	Santa Rita	São João Ii - Marengo
Northeast	MA	Santa Rita	São José Fogoso
Northeast	MA	Santa Rita	Sitio do Meio
Northeast	MA	Santa Rita	Vila Fé Em Deus
Northeast	MA	Santa Rita, Itapecuru-Mirim	Povoados Conduru, Conceição e Abana Fogo do Pa São Benedito
Northeast	MA	São Benedito do Rio Preto	Guarimã
Northeast	MA	São Bento	Azeitão
Northeast	MA	São Bento	Belem, São Raimundo, São Domingos e Rio do Meio
Northeast	MA	São Bento	Buritizal
Northeast	MA	São Bento	Conserva, Outeiro dos Régio e Satuba
Northeast	MA	São Bento	Guarapiranga
Northeast	MA	São Bento	Macajubal
Northeast	MA	São Bento	Outeiro de Paulo Macaco, Mata de Olímpio, São José
Northeast	MA	São Bento	Rumo e Pedra
Northeast	MA	São Bento	Santo Antônio e São Felipe
Northeast	MA	São Bento	São Benedito
Northeast	MA	São Domingos do Azeitão	Tabuleirão
Northeast	MA	São João Batista	Beirada e Quiriri
Northeast	MA	São João Batista	Boa Fé, Bom Jesus, Palmeral, Ilha dos Poços e Carão
Northeast	MA	São João Batista	Capim-Açú Ii
Northeast	MA	São João Batista	Chapada Grande
Northeast	MA	São João Batista	Enseada dos Silva
Northeast	MA	São João Batista	Olho d'Água dos Bodes
Northeast	MA	São João Batista	Quiá e Nova Brasília
Northeast	MA	São João Batista	Romana I
Northeast	MA	São João Batista	Romana Ii
Northeast	MA	São João do Soter	Cipó dos Cambraia, Morada Nova e Centro Novo
Northeast	MA	São João do Soter	Jacarezinho
Northeast	MA	São João do Soter	Santo Antônio
Northeast	MA	São João do Soter	São Zacarias Ii
Northeast	MA	São João do Soter	Zé Domingos
Northeast	MA	São José de Ribamar	Jussatuba
Northeast	MA	São Luís	Quilombo da Liberdade
Northeast	MA	São Luís Gonzaga do Maranhão	Boa Vista dos Freitas
Northeast	MA	São Luís Gonzaga do Maranhão	Centro dos Cruz/Bela Vista
Northeast	MA	São Luís Gonzaga do Maranhão	Coheb
Northeast	MA	São Luís Gonzaga do Maranhão	Fazenda Conceição
Northeast	MA	São Luís Gonzaga do Maranhão	Fazenda Velha/Monte Cristo
Northeast	MA	São Luís Gonzaga do Maranhão	Mata Burro/Santo Antônio dos Vieiras
Northeast	MA	São Luís Gonzaga do Maranhão	Monte Alegre/Olho d'Água dos Grilos
Northeast	MA	São Luís Gonzaga do Maranhão	Morada Nova Deusdeth
Northeast	MA	São Luís Gonzaga do Maranhão	Olho d'Agua dos Grilos
Northeast	MA	São Luís Gonzaga do Maranhão	Pedrinhas
Northeast	MA	São Luís Gonzaga do Maranhão	Potó Velho
Northeast	MA	São Luís Gonzaga do Maranhão	Potozinho
Northeast	MA	São Luís Gonzaga do Maranhão	Povoado de Santarém
Northeast	MA	São Luís Gonzaga do Maranhão	Promissão Velha
Northeast	MA	São Luís Gonzaga do Maranhão	Santa Cruz
Northeast	MA	São Luís Gonzaga do Maranhão	Santa Rosa
Northeast	MA	São Luís Gonzaga do Maranhão	Santana
Northeast	MA	São Luís Gonzaga do Maranhão	Santo Antônio do Costa
Northeast	MA	São Luís Gonzaga do Maranhão	São Domingos
Northeast	MA	São Luís Gonzaga do Maranhão	São Pedro
Northeast	MA	São Mateus	Alto Grande
Northeast	MA	São Mateus	Queimadas e Mutum
Northeast	MA	São Mateus	Vila Nova
Northeast	MA	São Vicente Férrer (Maranhão)	Aningas, Sapucaia e Jutaí
Northeast	MA	São Vicente Férrer (Maranhão)	Baixa Grande e Euzebio Grande
Northeast	MA	São Vicente Férrer (Maranhão)	Bom Lugar, Florença, Triunfo, Ilha do Meio e Macajubal
Northeast	MA	São Vicente Férrer (Maranhão)	Buenos Aires
Northeast	MA	São Vicente Férrer (Maranhão)	Canta Galo I
Northeast	MA	São Vicente Férrer (Maranhão)	Cantanhêde
Northeast	MA	São Vicente Férrer (Maranhão)	Charco
Northeast	MA	São Vicente Férrer (Maranhão)	Chega Tudo e Oratório
Northeast	MA	São Vicente Férrer (Maranhão)	Conceiçã0, São Marçal Monte Videl e Santo Antonio
Northeast	MA	São Vicente Férrer (Maranhão)	Enseada Freitas
Northeast	MA	São Vicente Férrer (Maranhão)	Ilha São José e Madureira
Northeast	MA	São Vicente Férrer (Maranhão)	Juçara
Northeast	MA	São Vicente Férrer (Maranhão)	Juçaral
Northeast	MA	São Vicente Férrer (Maranhão)	Limão
Northeast	MA	São Vicente Férrer (Maranhão)	Outeiro de Maria Justina
Northeast	MA	São Vicente Férrer (Maranhão)	Palmeiralzinho
Northeast	MA	São Vicente Férrer (Maranhão)	Pascoal
Northeast	MA	São Vicente Férrer (Maranhão)	Poleiro
Northeast	MA	São Vicente Férrer (Maranhão)	Povoado de Pachorra
Northeast	MA	São Vicente Férrer (Maranhão)	Santa Bárbara
Northeast	MA	São Vicente Férrer (Maranhão)	Santa Rosa
Northeast	MA	São Vicente Férrer (Maranhão)	São Francisco de Onório
Northeast	MA	São Vicente Férrer (Maranhão)	São Francisco dos Arouchas
Northeast	MA	São Vicente Férrer (Maranhão)	São Joaquim
Northeast	MA	São Vicente Férrer (Maranhão)	São Marcos
Northeast	MA	São Vicente Férrer (Maranhão)	São Pedro
Northeast	MA	São Vicente Férrer (Maranhão)	Soares
Northeast	MA	São Vicente Férrer (Maranhão)	Tabocal e Ilha d'Água
Northeast	MA	Satubinha	Sapucaia do Albino
Northeast	MA	Serrano do Maranhão	Açude
Northeast	MA	Serrano do Maranhão	Bacabal do Paraíso
Northeast	MA	Serrano do Maranhão	Boa Esperança dos Campos
Northeast	MA	Serrano do Maranhão	Boa Esperança Ii
Northeast	MA	Serrano do Maranhão	Brasília
Northeast	MA	Serrano do Maranhão	Cabanil
Northeast	MA	Serrano do Maranhão	Campinho
Northeast	MA	Serrano do Maranhão	Cedral Mirinzal
Northeast	MA	Serrano do Maranhão	Cedro
Northeast	MA	Serrano do Maranhão	Deus Bem Sabe
Northeast	MA	Serrano do Maranhão	Frechal dos Campos
Northeast	MA	Serrano do Maranhão	Iteno
Northeast	MA	Serrano do Maranhão	Luciana
Northeast	MA	Serrano do Maranhão	Malungos de Olho d'Água
Northeast	MA	Serrano do Maranhão	Mariano dos Campos
Northeast	MA	Serrano do Maranhão	Nazaré
Northeast	MA	Serrano do Maranhão	Palacete
Northeast	MA	Serrano do Maranhão	Paxibal
Northeast	MA	Serrano do Maranhão	Ponta
Northeast	MA	Serrano do Maranhão	Rio de Peixe
Northeast	MA	Serrano do Maranhão	Rosário
Northeast	MA	Serrano do Maranhão	Santa Filomena
Northeast	MA	Serrano do Maranhão	Santa Rosa
Northeast	MA	Serrano do Maranhão	Santo Antônio
Northeast	MA	Serrano do Maranhão	São Benedito
Northeast	MA	Serrano do Maranhão	Soledade
Northeast	MA	Serrano do Maranhão	Vera Cruz
Northeast	MA	Serrano do Maranhão	Vista Alegre
Northeast	MA	Timon	Monteiro
Northeast	MA	Turiaçu	Campinho
Northeast	MA	Turiaçu	Capoeira de Gado
Northeast	MA	Turiaçu	Crispim
Northeast	MA	Turiaçu	Estrela Divina
Northeast	MA	Turiaçu	Jamary dos Pretos
Northeast	MA	Turiaçu	Nova Caxias
Northeast	MA	Turiaçu	São José do Brito Mutá
Northeast	MA	Turilândia	Guajará
Northeast	MA	Turilândia	Pindobal de Fama
Northeast	MA	Turilândia	Turimirim
Northeast	MA	Tutóia	Itaperinha
Northeast	MA	Vargem Grande	Boa Vista dos Conrados
Northeast	MA	Vargem Grande	Caetana, Piqui da Rampa, Rampa e São Joaquim da Rampa
Northeast	MA	Vargem Grande	Canto da Capoeira
Northeast	MA	Vargem Grande	Deserto
Northeast	MA	Vargem Grande	Escondido
Northeast	MA	Vargem Grande	Mato Grosso
Northeast	MA	Vargem Grande	Morro Redondo
Northeast	MA	Vargem Grande	Penteado
Northeast	MA	Vargem Grande	Pontal de Areia
Northeast	MA	Vargem Grande	Povoado Belmonte
Northeast	MA	Vargem Grande	Santa Bárbara, Lagoa da Maria Rosa e Ferrugem
Northeast	MA	Vargem Grande	Santa Maria
Northeast	MA	Vargem Grande	São Francisco Malaquias
Northeast	MA	Viana	Cacoal
Northeast	MA	Viana	Cajueiro
Northeast	MA	Viana	Canarana
Northeast	MA	Viana	Capoeira
Northeast	MA	Viana	Carangueijo
Northeast	MA	Viana	Carro Quebrado
Northeast	MA	Viana	Contenda
Northeast	MA	Viana	Ferreira
Northeast	MA	Viana	Ipiranga
Northeast	MA	Viana	Melhora
Northeast	MA	Viana	Mucambo
Northeast	MA	Viana	Ponte de Tábua
Northeast	MA	Viana	Santa Helena Ii
Northeast	MA	Viana	Santa Rosa I
Northeast	MA	Viana	São Cristóvão
Northeast	MA	Viana	São Manoel

== List of territories ==
Order	quilombola land	Communities	County	State	Issuing body	Families	Claimed area (ha)	Title Size (ha)	Title date (dd/mm/year)	Notes
193	Achuí	Achuí	Santa Helena e Pinheiro	Maranhão	ITERMA	40	1.064,2147	1.064,2147	31/03/2022	
104	Aguiar	Aguiar	Viana	Maranhão	ITERMA	50	906,4145	906,4145	22/08/2011	
235	Aliança e Santa Joana	Aliança e Santa Joana	Cururupu	Maranhão	Incra	221	7.626,2492	3.982,5215	25/03/2024	
235	Aliança e Santa Joana	Aliança e Santa Joana	Cururupu	Maranhão	Incra	221	7.626,2492	1.785,4069	25/03/2024	
235	Aliança e Santa Joana	Aliança e Santa Joana	Cururupu	Maranhão	Incra	221	7.626,2492	1.277,3649	25/03/2024	
235	Aliança e Santa Joana	Aliança e Santa Joana	Cururupu	Maranhão	Incra	221	7.626,2492	580,9559	25/03/2024	
45	Altamira	Altamira	Pinheiro	Maranhão	ITERMA	68	1220.9398	1220.9398	27/12/2005	
110	Barreira	Barreira	Bacuri	Maranhão	ITERMA	45	889,0185	889,0185	19/12/2011	
111	Bem Posta	Bem Posta	Presidente Sarney	Maranhão	ITERMA	64	385,1886	385,1886	19/12/2011	
58	Bom Jesus	Bom Jesus	Candido Mendes	Maranhão	ITERMA	58	216,3937	216,3937	20/11/2006	
125	Boqueirão	Boqueirão	Icatu	Maranhão	ITERMA	40	1.637,3671	1.637,3671	11/11/2013	
126	Cacoal	Cacoal	Viana	Maranhão	ITERMA	71	114,0457	114,0457	11/11/2013	
103	Cajueiro	Cajueiro	Viana	Maranhão	ITERMA	65	271,2850	271,2850	22/08/2011	
78	Campo Redondo	Campo Redondo	Bacabal	Maranhão	ITERMA	38	1.521,1087	1.521,1087	14/11/2008	
186	Capoeira	Capoeira	Viana	Maranhão	ITERMA	66	261,4269	261,4269	13/07/2021	
105	Carangueijo	Carangueijo	Viana	Maranhão	ITERMA	26	274,3079	274,3079	22/08/2011	
158	Carro Quebrado	Carro Quebrado	Viana	Maranhão	ITERMA	84	176,9941	176,9941	07/10/2016	
	Cipó dos Cambaias	Cipó dos Cambaias	São João do Soter	Maranhão	ITERMA	124	2.404,9567	2.404,9567	01/09/2006	
	Condurus	Condurus	Cururupu	Maranhão	ITERMA	56	1.265,5586	1.265,5586	30/12/2022	
	Contenda	Contenda	Viana	Maranhão	ITERMA	55	1.070,0259	1.070,0259	18/08/2011	
	Cotovelo	Cotovelo	Pinheiro	Maranhão	ITERMA	55	1.220,3410	1.220,3410	14/11/2008	
	Cutia e Cocal	Cutia e Cocal	Presidente Sarney	Maranhão	ITERMA	66	17,6973	17,6973	19/12/2011	
	Cutia II	Cutia II	Matinha	Maranhão	ITERMA	110	99,2236	99,2236	11/11/2013	
	Deus Bem Sabe	Deus Bem Sabe	Serrano do Maranhão	Maranhão	ITERMA	251	1.717,7214	1.717,7214	20/11/2023	
	Eira dos Coqueiros	Eira dos Coqueiros	Codó	Maranhão	ITERMA	35	1.011,8271	1.011,8271	20/08/1999	
	Ferreira	Ferreira	Viana	Maranhão	ITERMA	50	309,1675	309,1675	22/08/2011	
	Graça	Graça	Matinha	Maranhão	ITERMA	51	356,8969	356,8969	26/06/2012	
	Imbiral	Imbiral	Pedro do Rosário	Maranhão	ITERMA	44	44,5899	44,5899	16/11/2016	
	Ipiranga	Ipiranga	Viana	Maranhão	ITERMA	56	1.124,5847	1.124,5847	07/10/2016	
	Itaperinha	Itaperinha	Tutoia	Maranhão	ITERMA	61	715,1046	715,1046	30/10/2014	
	Jacuíca	Jacuíca	Matinha	Maranhão	ITERMA	45	317,3447	317,3447	26/06/2012	
	Jamari dos Pretos	Jamari dos Pretos	Turiaçu	Maranhão	ITERMA	162	6.613,0630	6.613,0630	07/04/2011	
	Jenipapo	Jenipapo	Caxias	Maranhão	ITERMA	74	558,5242	558,5242	01/11/2002	
	Juçaral/Santa Helena	Juçaral/Santa Helena	Itapecuru-Mirim	Maranhão	ITERMA	30	345,4331	345,4331	20/11/2006	Current title is 57% of claimed area
	Juçaral / São Francisco Malaquias	São Francisco Malaquias	Vargem Grande	Maranhão	Incra	28	1.089,0918	625,5662	02/12/2014	
	Lago Grande	Lago Grande	Peritoró	Maranhão	ITERMA	44	906,8315	906,8315	20/11/2006	
	Malhada de Pretos	Malhada de Pretos	Peri Mirim	Maranhão	ITERMA	53	346,8973	346,8973	20/11/2023	
	Mata de São Benedito	Mata de São Benedito	Itapecuru Mirim	Maranhão	Incra	35	1.114,3978	54,7880	02/12/2014	Current title is 5% of claimed area
	Mirinzal da Julita	Mirinzal da Julita	Presidente Juscelino	Maranhão	ITERMA	25	330,1586	330,1586	07/11/2016	
	Mocorongo	Mocorongo	Codó	Maranhão	ITERMA	24	162,6254	162,6254	20/08/1999	
	Mucambo	Mucambo	Viana	Maranhão	ITERMA	110	397,0043	397,0043	22/08/2011	
	Olho D'água do Raposo	Olho D'água do Raposo	Caxias	Maranhão	ITERMA	72	187,3333	187,3333	27/12/2005	
	Pedrinhas	Pedrinhas	Anajatuba	Maranhão	ITERMA	28	128,6363	128,6363	14/11/2008	
	Promissão	Promissão	São Luis Gonzaga do Maranhão	Maranhão	ITERMA	85	179,5163	179,5163	09/08/2006	
	Quatro Bocas	Quatro Bocas	Presidente Sarney	Maranhão	ITERMA	40	398,4774	398,4774	09/11/2022	
	Queluz	Queluz	Anajatuba	Maranhão	ITERMA	125	243,4938	243,4938	25/09/2017	
	Rio dos Peixes	Rio dos Peixes	Pinheiro	Maranhão	ITERMA	47	54,2234	54,2234	01/09/2006	
	Rio Grande	Rio Grande	Bequimão	Maranhão	ITERMA	108	1.032,1306	1.032,1306	09/11/2022	
	Santa Cruz	Santa Cruz	Peri Mirim	Maranhão	ITERMA	55	258,1854	258,1854	20/11/2023	
	Santa Izabel	Santa Izabel	Candido Mendes	Maranhão	ITERMA	60	837,6155	837,6155	30/08/2006	
	Santa Maria dos Pretos	Santa Maria dos Pretos	Itapecuru Mirim	Maranhão	Incra	352	5.584,1620	401,3321	02/12/2014	Current title is 11% of claimed area
	Santa Maria dos Pretos	Santa Maria dos Pretos	Itapecuru Mirim	Maranhão	Incra	352	5.584,1620	206,1931	02/12/2014	Current title is 11% of claimed area
	Santa Rita do Vale	Santa Rita do Vale	Santa Rita	Maranhão	ITERMA	120	319,4535	319,4535	14/10/2009	
	Santana	Santana	Santa Rita	Maranhão	ITERMA	41	201,1171	201,1171	01/09/2006	
	Santa Tereza	Santa Tereza	Mirinzal	Maranhão	ITERMA	37	262,7899	262,7899	15/12/2016	
	Santo Antônio	Santo Antônio	Serrabo	Maranhão	ITERMA	180	277,3625	277,3625	18/11/2020	
	Santo Antonio dos Pretos	Santo Antonio dos Pretos	Codó	Maranhão	ITERMA	102	2.139,5500	2.139,5500	20/08/1999	
	Santo Inácio	Santo Inácio	Pinheiro	Maranhão	ITERMA	79	1.363,4178	1.363,4178	01/09/2006	
	Sâo Benedito	Sâo Benedito	Serrano do Maranhão	Maranhão	ITERMA	133	1.276,8493	1.276,8493	15/02/2022	
	São Benedito dos Carneiros	São Benedito dos Carneiros	Olinda Nova do Maranhão	Maranhão	ITERMA	45	219,2630	219,2630	11/11/2013	
	São José de Bruno	São José de Bruno	Matinha	Maranhão	ITERMA	38	386,8881	386,8881	11/11/2013	
	São José dos Portugueses	São José dos Portugueses	Cândido Mendes	Maranhão	ITERMA	279	2.119,7745	2.119,7745	19/05/2017	
	São Manoel	São Manoel	Viana	Maranhão	ITERMA	22	223,3642	223,3642	22/08/2011	
	Santa Rosa	Santa Rosa	Viana	Maranhão	ITERMA	32	605,6808	605,6808	22/08/2011	
	Santa Rosa e Adjacencias	Santa Rosa e Adjacencias	Viana	Maranhão	ITERMA	40	343,5436	343,5436	22/08/2011	
	São Sebastião dos Pretos	São Sebastião dos Pretos	Bacabal	Maranhão	ITERMA	62	1.010,2186	1.010,2186	27/12/2005	
	Soledade	Soledade	Serrano do Maranhã	Maranhão	ITERMA	68	707,2251	707,2251	19/11/2019	
	Tijuca	Tijuca	Peri Mirim	Maranhão	ITERMA	140	2.447,9516	2.447,9516	30/12/2022	
	Uzina Velha	Uzina Velha	Caxias	Maranhão	ITERMA	76	1.160,9576	1.160,9576	01/09/2006	
