= Quilombola communities in Maranhão =

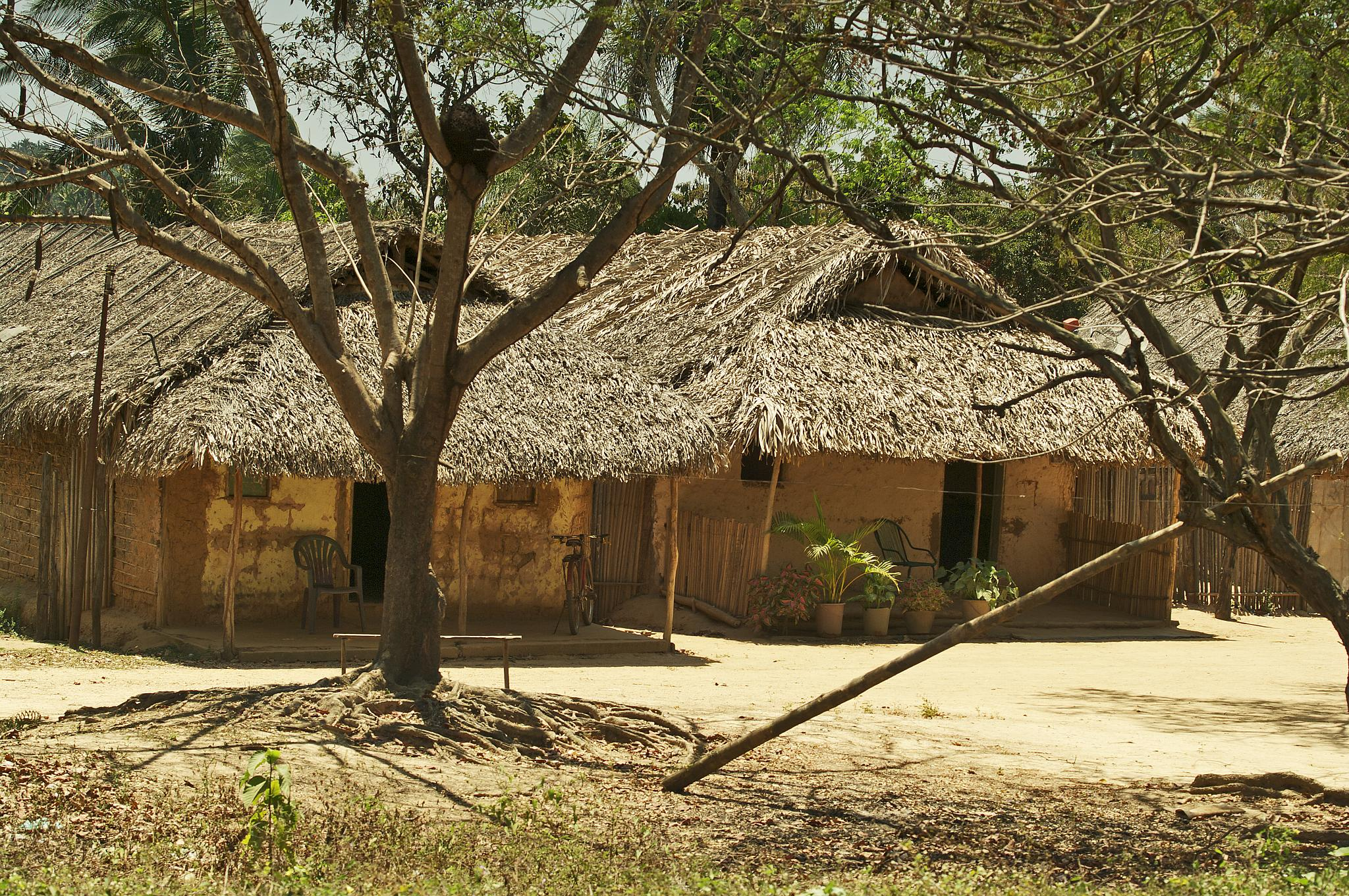
Mud houses are still a reality for many quilombola communities.

The quilombola communities in Maranhão, Brazil, emerged from the formation of quilombos, considered a place of refuge for enslaved Africans and their descendants, as well as from their reorganization after the abolition of slavery. In Maranhão, the history of the formation of quilombola communities is related to the expansion of cotton and rice plantations at the end of the 18th century, with the creation of the General Company of Commerce of Grão-Pará and Maranhão, as well as the abandonment of land by rural landowners due to economic decline at the end of the 19th century.

In 2018, there were 713 recognized quilombola communities in Maranhão, with 518 certificates issued by the Palmares Cultural Foundation, concentrated especially in the Baixada Maranhense and the Itapecuru and Mearim valleys. Currently, Maranhão is the state with the largest number of quilombola communities, with 2,025 (23.99%), followed by Bahia, with 1,814 communities, and Minas Gerais with 979 communities, corresponding to 21.49% and 11.60% of the total, respectively.

== History ==
From the 18th century onwards, a great transformation occurred in the landscape and population composition of Maranhão. With the Pombaline laws, indigenous labor (which generated conflicts with the Jesuits) was basically replaced by African labor, due to the implementation of large monocultures of cotton and rice in place of the exploitation of forest products (cloves, jatobá, indigo, etc.), tobacco and sugar cane. During this period, there was strong economic expansion, with the creation of the General Company of Commerce of Grão-Pará and Maranhão, in 1755, as a way to finance the region's economy, with large-scale importation of African labor (especially from the Gold Coast and Guinea-Bissau), in addition to credit to farmers.

The main producing regions of Maranhão were located on the banks of the great rivers Itapecuru, Mearim, Pindaré , Gurupi and Turiaçu. In the Itapecuru region, the largest number of cotton and rice farms were concentrated in the 19th century, especially in the municipalities of Codó and Coroatá, taking advantage of river transport to the Gulf of Maranhão. Other regions with a large concentration of enslaved people were the Baixada Maranhense and the coast of Maranhão.

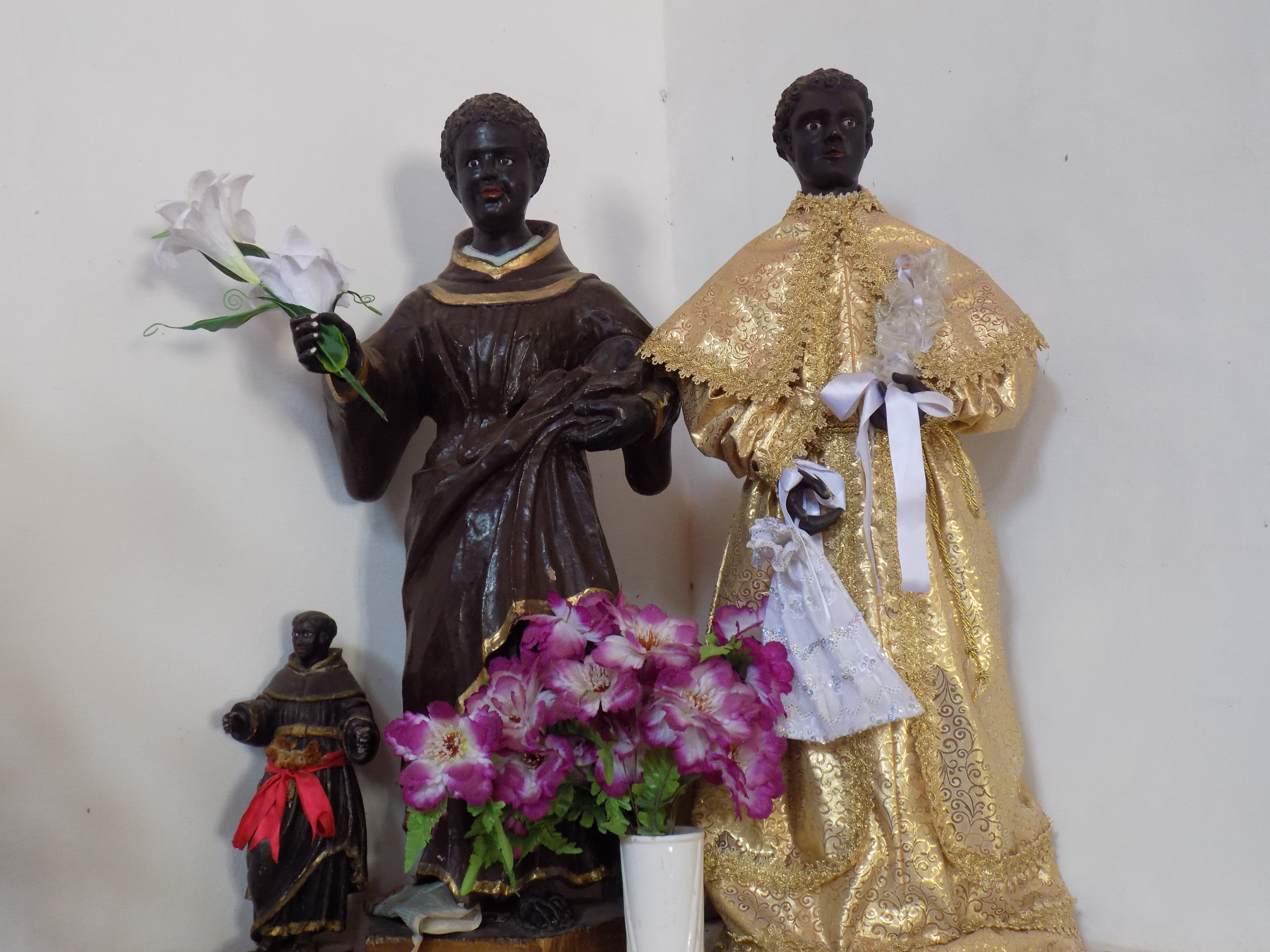
The Feast of Saint Benedict is one of the most important in Alcântara. The Church of Our Lady of the Rosary of the Blacks was built through the efforts of enslaved people.

The captaincy of Cumã or Tapuitapera (currently the municipalities of Alcântara and Guimarães ) was also a major producer of cotton and sugar cane. It is during this period that the construction of the large mansions in the Historic Center of São Luís and Alcântara took place.

Around 1798, enslaved people represented 47% of the population, a number that rose to 55% in the second decade of the 19th century, while the white population represented 16%. In the Itapecuru Valley, the number of enslaved people reached 80%.

However, Maranhão experienced an economic decline throughout the 19th century, caused by the resumption of cotton production in the United States (after the end of the American Revolutionary War ) and political crises in the colony, such as the Balaiada revolt, in which the participation of blacks and enslaved people was decisive. During the American Civil War, there was a new expansion of cotton and sugarcane production in the province, followed by a new decline with the end of the war. With the abolition of the slave trade, there was a trade in enslaved people between the provinces, especially for coffee production in the Center-South, which also contributed to the fall in the economy.

=== Formation of quilombos and communities ===
Since the 18th century, quilombos (maroon settlements) had already been formed in Maranhão as a means of resistance by the black population to slavery, through rebellions and escapes. The most significant were those of Lagoa Amarela, under the leadership of Negro Cosme, in Chapadinha, and São Benedito do Céu, in the Baixada Maranhense region, in Viana. The formation of quilombos was violently repressed by government forces.

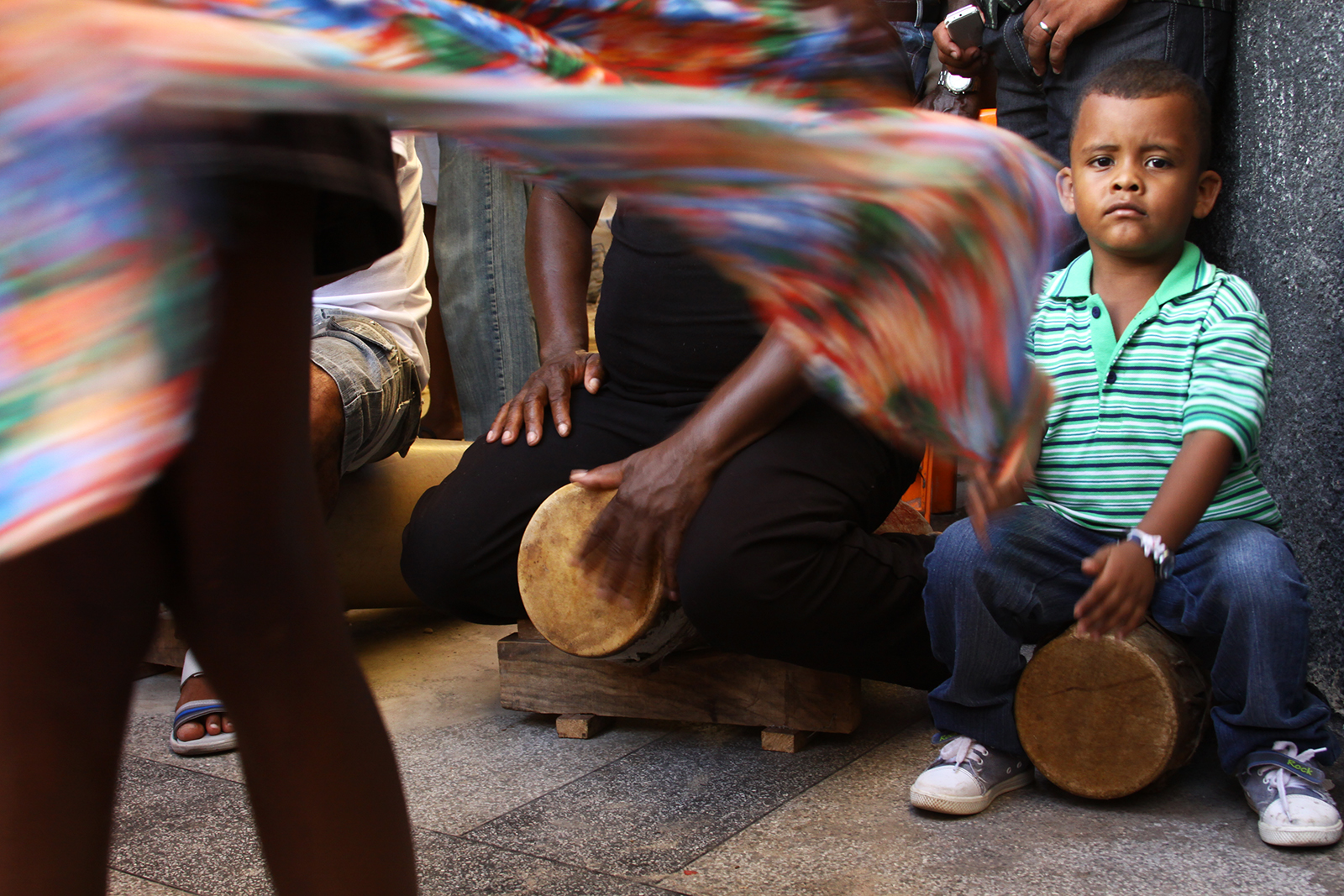
Tambor de crioula, a traditional dance of African heritage from Maranhão, performed at the São João festival in São Luís

From 1865 onwards, Alcântara experienced an economic decline, with a fall in exports and a shift in production to the valleys of the Itapecuru, Mearim and Pindaré Rivers, which led to the abandonment of land by the owners of large farms, and by the religious orders Carmo, Jesuits , Carmelites, and Mercedarians, who also owned land in Alcântara, leading the black population to promote other forms of organization and occupation of the territory.

This led to the development of different terms for how these lands were occupied: “Black Lands” (acquired through the provision of slave labor, or purchased by freed slaves), “Saint Lands” (bequeathed by Religious Orders to former slaves), and “Poverty Lands” (donations from bankrupt farms to former slaves, registered in a notary's office as a donation from the owner). These terms contributed to the construction of the cultural, religious, and territorial identity of these communities. Other former slaves moved to the cities in search of work.

The Quilombola culture in Maranhão is expressed in cultural manifestations such as bumba-meu-boi and tambor de crioula, popular Catholicism (such as the Feast of Saint Benedict and the Feast of the Divine) and religions of African origin (the tambor de mina and its caboclos and encantados ), in the way of life of the babaçu coconut breakers, in subsistence agriculture (and cassava flour production), harvesting of fruits such as juçara (açaí), among other aspects.

However, these communities face several difficulties, such as rural conflicts over land disputes with farmers, division of agricultural production with landowners, socioeconomic vulnerability, and difficulty accessing basic education and health services.

According to IBGE, 94% of the population of Serrano do Maranhão is quilombola, and the Quilombo Nazaré is located there.

Oxalaia quilombensis was the largest carnivorous dinosaur that lived on the Brazilian coast, having been found on Cajual Island, in Alcântara, and named in honor of the quilombola communities of the region.

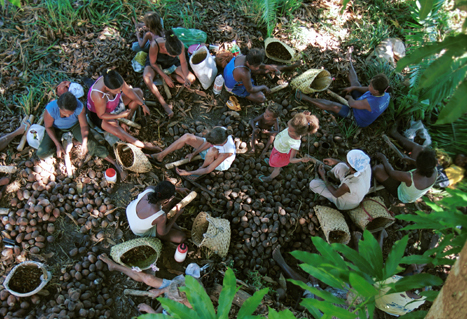
The harvesting of babassu coconuts in the Bico do Papagaio region, Municipality of Pequizeiro - Tocantins. The harvesting of babassu coconuts is also a source of income for many quilombola communities.

=== Quilombola movement ===
Both the inhabitants of lands formed by former quilombos and of black communities formed after the end of slavery sought to organize themselves, with the emergence of black movements from the 1970s onwards. With the 1988 Constitution, and its article 68 of the Transitory Constitutional Provisions Act (ADCT), guaranteeing definitive ownership of lands to the remnants of quilombos who are occupying them, black communities gained greater attention in their struggle for recognition for land titling and access to basic services, such as education and health. An example is the Quilombo do Frechal Extractive Reserve, in Mirinzal, in the Baixada Maranhense, established in 1992.

Removals in Alcântara

In the coastal territory of Alcântara (MA), the installation of the aerospace base by the Air Force, starting in the 1980s during the military dictatorship, resulted in the expulsion of dozens of quilombola communities and their resettlement in agro-villages, with serious impacts on their ways of life. For decades, other communities on the Alcântara coast remained under threat of further removals due to the expansion interests of the Alcântara Launch Center territory, such as the quilombos of Manuna, Brito, Canelatiua, and Vista Alegre. Quilombola social movements spearheaded the fight for rights and denounced the violations. In 2025, the Inter-American Court of Human Rights condemned the Brazilian State for violating the human rights of the communities affected by the removal process. In the same year, the federal government came to the municipality and began the process of land titling, ending a conflict that had lasted almost four decades.

Urban Quilombos:

In 2019, the Palmares Foundation recognized the Liberdade neighborhood in São Luís as a quilombo remnant community, making the region the first urban quilombo recognized in Maranhão and its area encompasses five neighborhoods of São Luís (Liberdade, Camboa, Fé em Deus, Diamante and Sítio do Meio), with a population of approximately 160,000 residents, constituting one of the largest urban quilombos in Latin America.

== Population ==
In the 2022 Demographic Census, Maranhão had 269,074 quilombola people, equivalent to 3.97% of the state's population (the highest proportion in the country), living in 109 of Maranhão's 217 municipalities. Approximately 20.26% of Brazil's quilombola population lived in Maranhão, making it the second state with the largest quilombola population. The municipalities with the largest quilombola populations were:

Município	quilombola population	Proportion of the total population (%)
Alcântara	15 616	84,57
Itapecuru-Mirim	14 488	23,98
Pinheiro	10 608	12,54
Santa Rita	10 236	27,64
Viana	9 963	19,37
Penalva	9 269	28,51
São Vicente Férrer	9 255	47,47
São Luís	8 294	0,8
Anajatuba	6 915	27,31
Cururupu	6 578	20,84
Mirinzal	6 530	46,72
Cajari	6 379	38,87
São Bento	6 302	13,58
Matinha	6 220	28,23

The municipalities with the highest percentage of quilombola people in relation to the general population in the 2022 Census were:

Município	Proportion of the total population (%)
Alcântara	84,57
Serrano do Maranhão	55,74
Central do Maranhão	48,39
São Vicente Férrer	47,47
Mirinzal	46,72
Bacurituba	44,49
Cajari	38,87
Presidente Juscelino	32,99
Guimarães	30,81
Axixá	30,43
Penalva	28,51
Matinha	28,23
São João Batista	27,96
Santa Rita	27,64

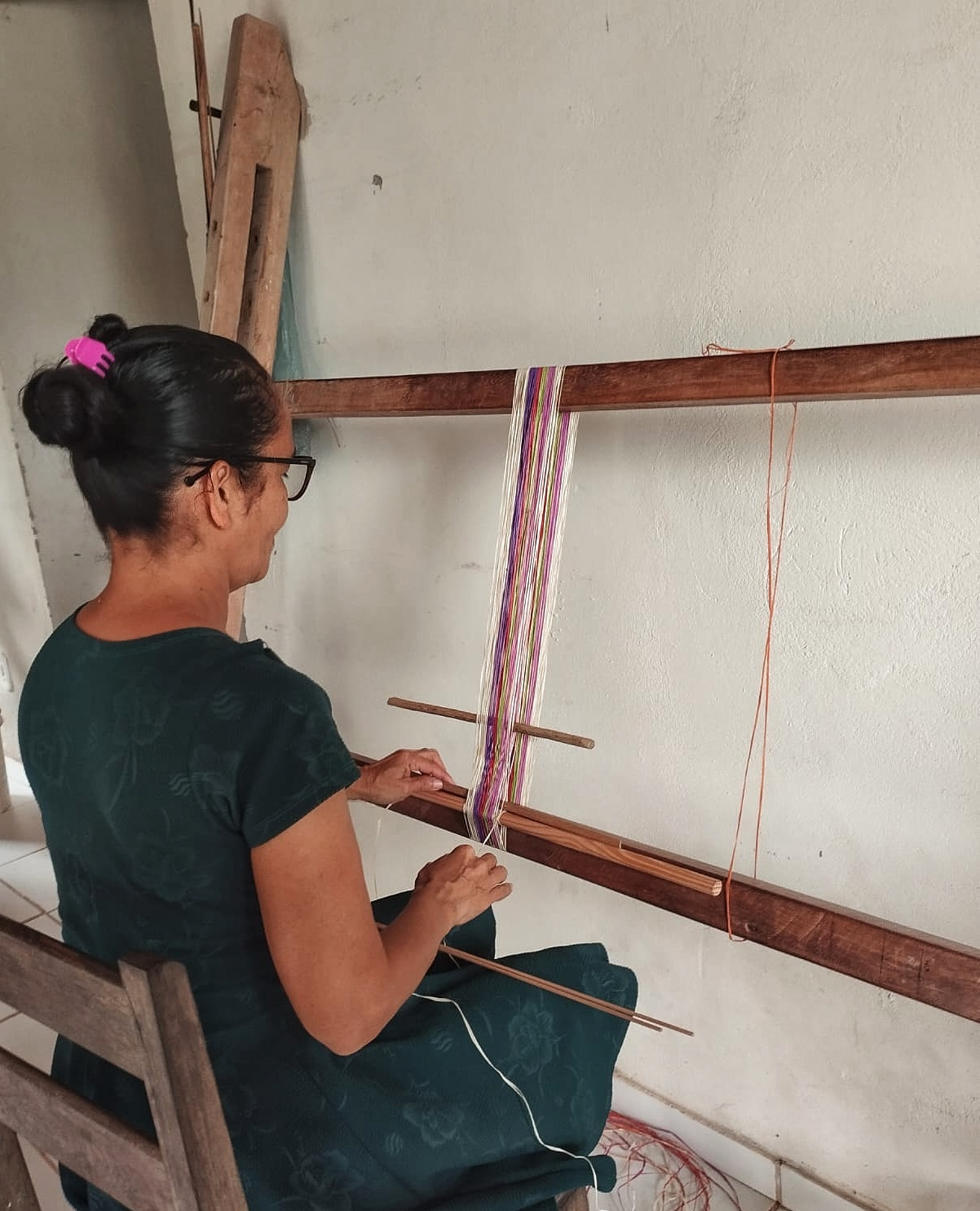
Handicrafts being produced within the Quilombo of Santa Maria in Alcântara.

The most populous Quilombola Territories in the state were: Alcântara (9,855), also the most populous Quilombola Territory in Brazil; Santa Rosa dos Pretos (2,904), the tenth most populous in Brazil, in Itapecuru-Mirim; Monge Belo (1,432) in Anajatuba; Aliança/Santa Joana (732), in Cururupu and Mirinzal; Santo Antônio dos Pretos (719), in Codó; Quilombo Frechal (718), in Mirinzal.

As of July 31, 2022, there were 81 Quilombola Territories officially demarcated in Maranhão, with complete territorial regularization.

Approximately 89.21% of the quilombola people in Maranhão lived outside quilombola territories, while 10.79% lived in quilombola territories.

== See also ==
- List of quilombola territories
  - List of quilombola communities in Maranhão
