= TV Maranhense =

- São Luís, Maranhão; Brazil
- Channels: Digital: 17 (UHF); Virtual: 17
- Branding: TV Maranhense

Programming
- Affiliations: Rede Brasil de Televisão

Ownership
- Owner: Sistema Maranhense de Radiodifusão; (Sistema Maranhense de Radiodifusão Ltda.)

History
- First air date: May 1998
- Former channel numbers: Analog: 12 (VHF, 1998–2018)
- Former affiliations: Rede Manchete (1998-1999); TV!, RedeTV! (1999-2000); Rede Bandeirantes (2000-2019); TV Cultura (2019-2021)

Technical information
- Licensing authority: ANATEL
- ERP: 0.51 kW
- Transmitter coordinates: 2°32′29.5″S 44°17′56.3″W

Links
- Public license information: Profile
- Website: tvmaranhense.com

TV Maranhense (channel 17) is a Rede Brasil-affiliated television station based in São Luís, Maranhão. The station is owned by Sistema Maranhense de Radiodifusão, owned by former state deputee Manoel Ribeiro. His daughter, Kátia Ribeiro, is the group's president.

== History ==
=== TV Praia Grande (1998-2005) ===
The station signed on in May 1998 as TV Praia Grande, as a Rede Manchete, which lost its affiliation agreement with TV São Luís less than one year before (having joined Rede Record). The broadcasts were experimental, during commercial breaks it aired a musical cue with the narration "TV Praia Grande, canal 12, em caráter experimental", announced by local radio personality Edmilson Filho.

Even with the Manchete crisis, which led to its culmination by sale to TeleTV on 17 May 1999, TV Praia Grande carried the transitional phase to RedeTV! (branded on screen as just TV!), being one of its first affiliates. In this phase, the station, which was initially owned by politician João Castelo, was sold to another politician, Manoel Ribeiro, changing its headquarters from the Turu neighborhood to Madre Deus, in the central region of São Luís. At that time, it started airing its own local programs.

In 2000, with the conflicts between TV Cidade and TV São Luís for the Record affiliation, and the latter's end of contract with the network, Rede Bandeirantes signed an agreement to become its affiliate from 13 August that year.

=== TV Maranhense (2005-present) ===
In May 2005, coinciding with its seventh annivesary, TV Praia Grande was renamed TV Maranhense. In 2011, following Band's pre-requisite for the renewal of the contract and production of local news programs, TV Maranhense initiated a series of changes to its schedule, with the introduction of new programs and reformulatino of others. However, in 2012, it faced a large financial crisis, firing several staff.

With the crisis, several problems witnessed behind the scenes were exposed, such as the station's devaluation, delayed wages and insatisfaction Rede Bandeirantes had with the affiliate. In the same year, in order to surpass the crisis, TV Maranhense hired director Henrique Neto, who was in charge of the creator of a new schedule to make the station relevant again.

On 25 January 2018, TV Metropolitana, back then a Rede Brasil affiliate, joined Band, confirmed in RBTV's website. The deaffiliation motivated the station's owner, Manoel Ribeiro, to send a lawsuit to TRE-MA, which was confirmed via a note seen on the station on 27 January, where the station alleged to have a contract with Band until 2020, and said that the affiliation with TV Metropolitana with the network was "clandestine". Band, however, alleged that it was in conformity with all disaffiliation conditions stipulated in the contract, which was sealed on 24 January, and already had an appeal to revert the station's decision. With the indefinition of the judicial decision, TV Maranhense continued relaying Band simultaneously with TV Metropolitana.

On 9 April, Diário Oficial da União published an MCTIC ordinance granting UHF channel 17 (which TV Maranhense broadcast on) to Band, causing a turnaround in the impasse. TV Maranhense used its digital signal since 14 November 2015 using a formerly-empty frequency in ANATEL's Digital Television Basic Channel Distribution Plan, but was not granted for that, infringing article 70 of the Brazilian Telecommunications Code. From the date of the analog shutdown on 28 March, and since the license to broadcast on VHF channel 12 was deemed illegal by MCTIC, the station technically became illegal, according to article 184 of the General Telecommunications Law.

At around 4:30pm on 17 April 2018, during Brasil Urgente, TV Maranhense suddenly went off the air. Although the station informed that this was caused due to technical difficulties, sources believed that ANATEL suspended its transmissions by locking its equipment. The station then issued a new lawsuit, this time, to unauthorize the use of UHF channel 17 by TV Metropolitana, which started using this frequency on 12 May, as well as soliciting the unlocking of transmitters to resume operations, which ANATEL received on 6 August. At around 5pm on 7 August, it resumed operating, during Brasil Urgente, and restarted local programming on 13 August.

TV Maranhense continued airing Rede Bandeirantes until the end of the judicial affair, which was won by the network, around one year and two months after it began. After that, it removed all references to Band's programs on its official website and social media accounts. At midnight on 28 March 2019, during Quarta no Cinema, it cut the network's broadcast of The Brass Teapot and aired an announcement joining TV Cultura, then it joined to the network during Persona Em Foco, already in progress. Cultura was previously on TV Universitária, which became independent.

On 1 September 2021, the two-year contract with TV Cultura was not renewed, as consequence, TV Maranhense became an RBTV affiliate. TV Cultura recouped its affiliation on 8 September, this time with TV Guará.

== Technical information ==
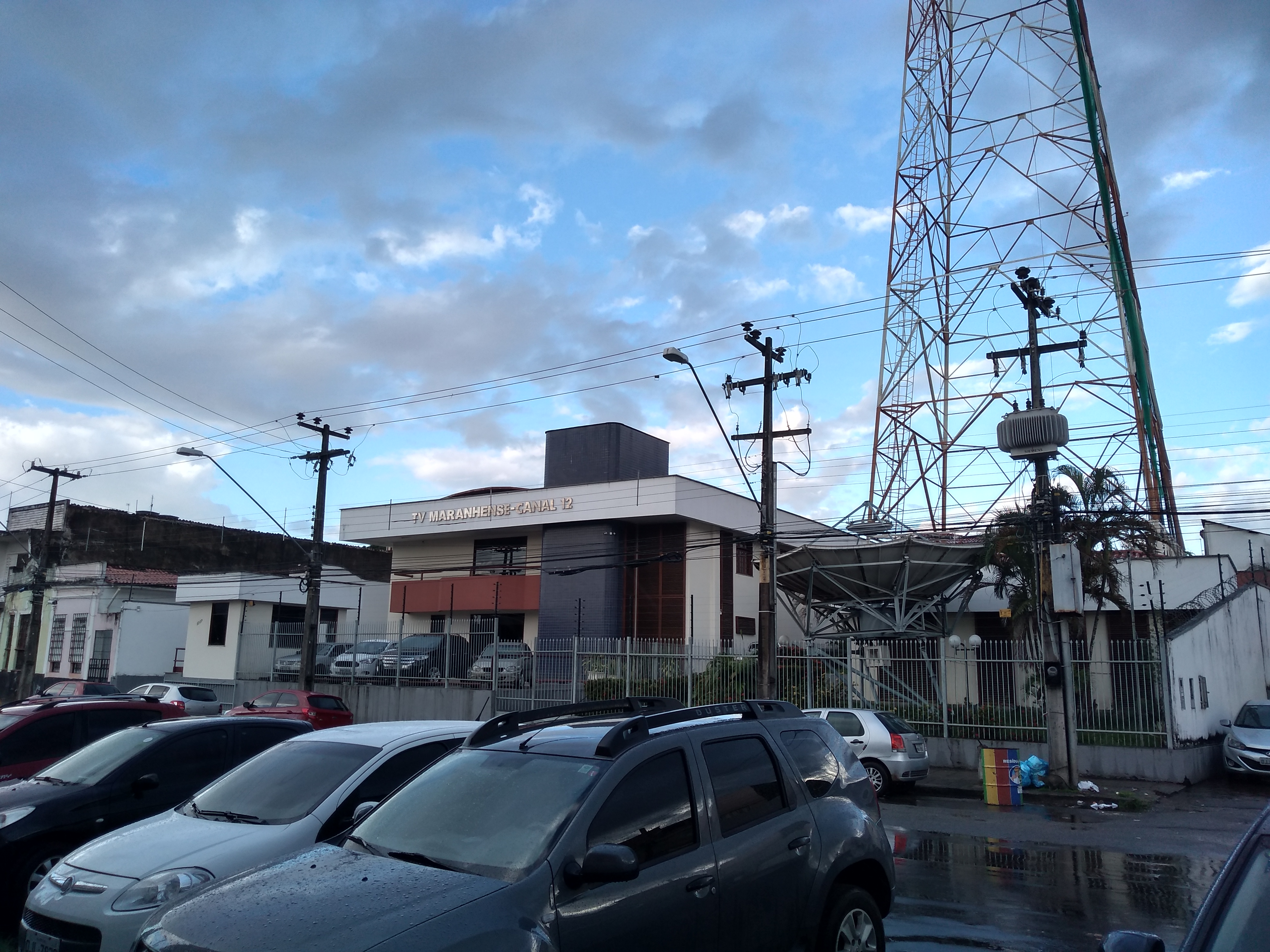
Station headquarters at the Madre Deus neighborhood, in 2019

| Virtual channel | Digital channel | Aspect ratio | Content |
|---|---|---|---|
| 17.1 | 17 UHF | 1080i | TV Maranhense/Rede Brasil's main programming |
| 17.2 | 17 UHF | 480i | RBTV (national feed) |
