= Manuel Francisco dos Anjos Ferreira =

Brazilian rebel (1784–1841)

- Born: 1784; Coroatá, Maranhão, State of Brazil
- Died: 1841; Caxias, Maranhão, Empire of Brazil

Manuel Francisco dos Anjos Ferreira, also known as Manuel dos Anjos Ferreira or Manuel Balaio (1784–1841), was a straw basket (or balaio) maker who became one of the main leaders of the Balaiada, a revolt against the Brazilian monarchy that occurred between 1838 and 1841 in the state of Maranhão. His nickname came from the balaios that he would sell in places like his hometown of Coroatá and in Itapecuru Mirim.

== Biography and historical context ==
It is unknown what led him to take arms; it has been said that it was vengeance due to a soldier raping his daughter, while others posit that it was to avoid his children being recruited by force.

Many people in Maranhão, including enslaved people, free Black people, farmers, and vaqueiros, became the main groups of people involved in the Balaiada, which began in Maranhão, but later spread to the states of Piauí and Ceará. They were excluded from political life, with much of the population living in slavery. Together with the dire living conditions in the state, while also being forced to serve in the military, they rebelled in 1838 against the conservative elite, represented by large-scale property owners and military personnel. They fought against the troops of the Brazilian Empire for four years.

After Manuel Balaio's death during the rebellion and when co-leader Raimundo Gomes' men were defeated by Luis Alves de Lima e Silva, the future Duke of Caxias, Cosme Bento (a formerly enslaved man and a quilombo leader who was one of the other main leaders of the "balaios") assumed leadership of the movement. The strength of the "balaios" began to diminish as, in 1840, a large number of the rebels surrendered due to a concession deal being made. Shortly afterwards, the rest of the army surrendered. After he was captured, Cosme Bento was sentenced to death by hanging.
