= TV Cidade (São Luís) =

Television station in São Luis, Brazil

TV Cidade São Luís (ZYA 660)
- São Luís, Maranhão; Brazil
- Channels: Digital: 36 (UHF); Virtual: 6
- Branding: TV Cidade

Programming
- Affiliations: Record

Ownership
- Owner: Grupo Cidade de Comunicação (50%) Grupo Rocha (50%); (Rádio Ribamar Ltda.)
- Sister stations: Cidade FM; Rádio Capital

History
- First air date: September 8, 1981
- Former names: TV Ribamar (1981-1993)
- Former channel numbers: Analog: 6 (VHF, 1981–2018)
- Former affiliations: Rede Bandeirantes (1981-2000); Rede Mulher (2000); RedeTV! (2000-2004)

Technical information
- Licensing authority: ANATEL
- ERP: 5 kW
- Transmitter coordinates: 2°32′3.9″S 44°17′29.3″W

Links
- Public license information: Profile
- Website: suacidade.com

TV Cidade Record is a Brazilian television station based in São Luís, capital of the state of Maranhão. It operates on channel 6.1 (36 UHF digital), and is part of Record's affiliates. The station is owned by Grupo Cidade de Comunicação, which also includes Cidade FM and the SuaCidade.com portal.

== History ==
=== Background ===
In 1977, MiniCom launched a competition for a new TV station in São Luís, in which the Vieira da Silva Group, owned by the then federal deputy for ARENA, Raimundo Lisboa Vieira da Silva, and Sistema Verdes Mares, owned by Ceará businessman Edson Queiroz, participated. At the same time linked to the Sarney family, and having even supported João Castelo's candidacy for governor of Maranhão in 1978, Vieira da Silva, who had already owned Companhia Telefônica do Maranhão (COTEMA) since the 1960s and had recently acquired Rádio Ribamar (today Rádio Capital) from Gérson Tavares, sought political favor to obtain the concession. On May 15, 1979, Grupo Vieira da Silva won the competition, and announced that it would put the station on air within 12 months, which ended up not happening.

=== TV Ribamar (1981-1993) ===
TV Ribamar was officially founded by Raimundo Vieira da Silva on September 8, 1981, the 369th anniversary of the city of São Luís, through VHF channel 6. Affiliated with Rede Bandeirantes, it was the second commercial broadcaster in the city, which until then only had TV Difusora (a Rede Globo affiliate) and TVE Maranhão, owned by the state government. Until 1986, the year in which TV Mirante began its experimental broadcasts, the station was also one of the affiliates of Rede Bandeirantes which broadcast Programa Silvio Santos, produced by SBT, on Sundays, instead of Show do Esporte.

In 1985, faced with the high costs of maintaining a TV station, Vieira da Silva sought loans in yen and also financing from Banco do Brasil and Banco do Nordeste to settle the station's debts. However, he ended up accumulating more debts, and without being able to pay off the debts, he negotiated the sale of 50% of the shares in the broadcaster and the other companies in the current Grupo Cidade de Comunicação with the then state governor, Luiz Rocha. Rocha would only come to take part of his shares in 1989, having in the meantime passed them on to Luís Pires, an orange businessman from Tocantins, as he would not have been able to justify the financial resources used to buy 50% of the shares, being governor.

=== TV Cidade (since 1993) ===
On September 8, 1993, 12 years after its founding, the station changed its name to TV Cidade, at the same time that its co-sister Cidade FM completed 10 years of foundation. During the 1990s, the broadcaster invested in new equipment and improved signal quality, expanding its coverage to more municipalities in the north of the state.

In 2000, after almost 19 years of affiliation with Rede Bandeirantes, the station's owners began negotiating affiliation with Rede Record, which in turn had been retransmitted by TV São Luís since 1997, and were not satisfied with the affiliate's performance. As TV Cidade and Band do not renew their contract, the broadcaster signs with Record, even though TV São Luís already has an affiliate, and from then on a dispute begins between the two broadcasters for the São Paulo network's signal. In the early hours of August 13, after the contract ended, Rede Bandeirantes began to have its signal retransmitted by TV Praia Grande, and TV Cidade, still in an impasse with TV São Luís, ended up going off the air as there was no television network to broadcast. Rede Record then released Rede Mulher's signal so that the channel could reestablish its transmissions until the impasse was resolved.

On September 1, after 20 days off the air, TV Cidade resumed its broadcasts with the Rede Mulher signal. The owners, however, announced that the affiliation would be provisional, as they did not see Rede Mulher as a competitive broadcaster, due to the excess of programs from the Universal Church of the Kingdom of God and also due to their own programming that did not generate an audience. On November 20, the broadcaster started rebroadcasting RedeTV!, which two months earlier was rebroadcast on TV Praia Grande.

In 2001, in addition to the dispute with TV São Luís, there also began to be administrative problems at TV Cidade and Grupo Cidade de Comunicação. Luiz Rocha, partner of the broadcaster since 1985, dies on March 8 at the age of 63, and his wife Terezinha Rocha and son Roberto Rocha take over his shares. A few weeks later, with the death of Maria do Rosário, wife of Raimundo Vieira da Silva and also a shareholder of TV Cidade, the brothers Marco Antônio, Fabiano and Paulo Sérgio began to disagree with their father over control of the group, and ended up going to court to try to ban him on the grounds that he could not take care of the company due to his health. In 2002, after confusion between the two inside TV Cidade's headquarters, employees took the station off the air for a few hours as a form of protest and also to denounce its scrapping.

Vieira da Silva then seeks help from the Rocha family to manage the company. Terezinha Rocha and Roberto Rocha, the heirs of the 50% estate that belonged to Luiz Rocha, are legalized as the new partners, after having also negotiated another 25% of the shares, while Vieira da Silva's children go to court demanding repossession, claiming that there was a previously prepared sharing decision declaring that they directly owned 50% of the broadcaster's shares, and won the case. In 2003, after reconciling with his children, Vieira da Silva went back on his decision to sell 25% of the shares, and went to court to annul the division made with the Rocha family in 2002. After achieving the annulment, TV Cidade and the other companies of Grupo Cidade de Comunicação were once again divided half-and-half between the Vieira da Silvas and the Rocha, each having 50% of the shares.

In the early hours of April 1, 2004, TV Cidade stopped broadcasting RedeTV! programming and became the new Maranhão affiliate of Rede Record, at the same time that TV São Luís started to retransmit RedeTV! with the end of his contract with Edir Macedo's network. From then on, the broadcaster, which was already scrapped and with few investments, began to rebuild itself, with the installation of a new transmitter, which allowed the expansion of its coverage area and the purchase of new equipment, in addition to the reformulation and debut of new programs in the second half of the decade.

On July 30, 2007, Raimundo Vieira da Silva died at the age of 85, and his sons assumed controlling interest in Grupo Cidade de Comunicação, with Marco Antônio Vieira da Silva being the new president, and Fabiano and Paulo Sérgio, respectively, vice-president and television director. That same year, TV Cidade began its expansion into the interior of the state, with the implementation of satellite retransmitters and partnerships with other stations. On September 8, the broadcaster launched its website, which in 2011 was renamed SuaCidade.com. That same year, in celebration of its 30th anniversary, it reformulated its visual identity, adopting a new logo.

== Affiliates ==
Grupo	Station	City	Channel	Callsign	Affiliate since
—N/a	TVC Barra do Corda	Barra do Corda	12	RTV	No information
Grupo Rocha de Comunicação	TV Capital	Balsas	8	RTV	2023
—N/a	TV Cidade	Alto Alegre do Maranhão	13	RTV	No information
Cidade Produções	TV Cidade	Bacabal	7 (49)	RTV	2019
Grupo Murad	TV Cidade	Coroatá	4	RTV	1999
—N/a	TV Cidade	Cururupu	44	RTV	No information
—N/a	TV Cidade	Peri Mirim	6	RTV	No information
Prefeitura Municipal de Presidente Dutra	TV Cidade	Presidente Dutra	7 (26)	RTV	No information
—N/a	TV Cidade	Viana	5	RTV	No information
Sistema Jaguarema	TV Jaguarema	Vitorino Freire	6 (29)	RTV	No information
Sistema de Rádio e TV Maracu	TV Maracu	Viana	11	RTV	2020
Meireles & Fernandes Ltda.	Nova TV	Vargem Grande	40	RTV	No information
Grupo Magnólia	TV Remanso	Vargem Grande	7 (40)	RTV	2007
