= Raimundo Gomes =

Brazilian politician

- Born: Raimundo Gomes Vieira Jatahy

Raimundo Gomes Vieira Jatahy (fl. 1830s) was an important Brazilian leader of the Balaiada. He was a vaqueiro who administered the plantation of Padre Inácio Mendes (a liberal, or bem-te-vi). The imprisonment of his brother and Gomes' and their fathers' freeing of said brother was one of the catalysts that led to the Balaiada.

== Biography ==
Gomes had passed through the village of Manga in Maranhão while taking an oxcart to sell items in another municipality. The vice-mayor of the village, José Egito, a conservative (or cabano) and political adversary of Padre Mendes, sent an order to recruit some men to accompany Gomes and to imprison his brother on 13 December 1838. In response, Raimundo Gomes and their father, Inácio Mendes, and nine other men freed his brother. They fled to Chapadinha, reinforcing his group with freed prisoners and 22 soldiers in charge of local policing operations. These actions would eventually lead to the creation of the Balaiada uprising throughout the Northeast of Brazil, as both Cosme Bento (a formerly enslaved man and a quilombo leader) and Manuel Francisco dos Anjos Ferreira (or Manuel Balaio, a local basketweaver) joined him and galvanized various groups in Maranhão and beyond.

Many people in Maranhão, including enslaved people, free Black people, farmers, and vaqueiros, became the main groups of people involved in the Balaiada, which began in Maranhão but later spread to the states of Piauí and Ceará. They were excluded from political life, with much of the population living in slavery. Together with the dire living conditions in the state, while also being forced to serve in the military, they rebelled in 1838 against the conservative elite, represented by large-scale property owners and military personnel. They fought against the troops of the Brazilian Empire for four years. After Manuel Balaio's death during the rebellion and Gomes' men were defeated by Luis Alves de Lima e Silva, the future Duke of Caxias, Cosme Bento assumed leadership of the movement. The strength of the "balaios" began to diminish as, in 1840, many rebels surrendered due to a concession deal being made. Shortly afterwards, the rest of the army surrendered. After he was captured, Cosme Bento was sentenced to death by hanging.
