= Cosme Bento =

Black Brazilian leader of quilombo

- Born: Cosme Bento das Chagas between 1800 and 1802; Sobral, Ceará, State of Brazil
- Died: September 1842; Itapecuru Mirim, Maranhão, Empire of Brazil

Cosme Bento das Chagas (between 1800 and 1802 – September 1842), also known as Negro Cosme, was the Black Brazilian leader of a settlement of runaway enslaved people, known as a quilombo. In 1830, having already been freed from slavery, was imprisoned in São Luís, in Maranhão, for having murdered Francisco Raimundo Ribeiro. He escaped prison and, after a period where there is little historical record of him, became a leader of a quilombo.

In December 1838, the movement, known as the Balaiada, broke out of Maranhão due the invasion of the jail in the village of Manga by Raimundo Gomes. With the rebellion repressed by Luís Alves de Lima e Silva, the resistance would only be maintained with the military support given by Cosme Bento and the more than 3,000 people he commanded. Cosme adopted the title of "Dom Cosme Bento das Chagas, Tutor e Imperador da Liberdade Bem-Te-Vi" and established on the Tocanguira plantation, in Lagoa Amarela, the largest quilombo in Maranhão's history.

After Raimundo Gomes was arrested on 15 January 1841, the movement had been considered disbanded, but Cosme was only imprimosed in Mearim on 7 February. Imprisoned for helping enslaved people rise up, he was executed in September 1842, hanged in front of Itapecuru public prison, now the Casa da Cultura Professor João Silveira.

== Background ==
With the end of the first reign of the Empire of Brazil and the beginning of the regency period, much of the country had various rebellions, riots, and agitations against the established order. Due to the political and economic instability, this period came to be known as one of the most turbulent in the country's history.

At the beginning of the 19th century, the state of Maranhão had approximately 200,000 people, of which more than half were enslaved people that were forced to work on cotton plantations. The living conditions of the state were extremely poor, and the economic and governmental levers were largely controlled by large-scale land owners and merchants.

During this time period, the state, which was one of the largest exporters of cotton, went through a grave economic crisis due to competition with the United States. The livestock industry, which had a strong connection with salaries with its export, along with financing the slave trade in the state, began to collapse. Such a political scenario, a dispute of power began to rise among the elite, that was seen all throughout the state between liberals (bem-te-vis) and by conservatives (cabanos).

The instability in Maranhão was also the product of the larger population living in poverty. Adding to this, the political reaction was repressive in nature each time, by way of violence and arbitrary arrests. The cause of the revolt, then, primarily was due to the imprisonment of vaqueiro Raimundo Gomes' brother, also known as Cara Preta, after an accusation made by the vice-mayor of Vila da Manga, José Egito, a conservative. On 13 December 1838, Raimundo Gomes, with nine other men, invaded the public prison and freed him, reinforcing his group with freed prisoners and 22 soldiers in charge of local policing operations.

Gomes received the support of Lívio Pedro Moura, Mulungueta, and Manuel Francisco dos Anjos Ferreira, also known as Manuel Balaio, of which his nickname became the name of the larger movement. Later on, they would be joined by Cosme Bento, a former enslaved person who led a quilombo of 3000 African enslaved people who fled the plantations.

== Early life ==
Cosme Bento das Chagas, also known as "Negro Cosme", was born into slavery between 1800 and 1802, in the city of Sobral, in the state of Ceará. Along with the work he was forced to do, he would also live off of the small amount of money he made from doing menial tasks. Unlike the majority of enslaved people, Cosme knew how to read and write. While still young, he was freed and moved to the state of Maranhão. Little is known about his early life, such as precise dates on important events in his life until then.

However, on 22 September 1830, he was arrested allegedly killing Francisco Raimundo Ribeiro in Itapecuru-Mirim, being sent to the state capital, São Luís. Cosme escaped prison on 1 May 1833, after leading a rebellion among the imprisoned. While escaping, he went on to assist in a larger rebellion among enslaved Black people at various plantations in the region.

Hiding among the various quilombos, he helped many enslaved people free themselves and flee the oppression of the enslavers, helping grow a large freed Black population, led by his guidance, ideology, and cause. He conceded himself the title of "Dom Cosme Bento das Chagas, Tutor e Imperador da Liberdade Bem-Te-Vi", establishing his headquarters at Lagoa Amarela, in the Comarca do Brejo, next to the Munim and Mearim rivers, in the Itapecuru valley. As such, the largest quilombo in the history of Maranhão was founded on the grounds of the Tocanguira plantation.

Cosme extended help and fraternity to all those who supported his fight against slavery and the suffering caused by it, at times seeking to enshrine his leadership through elements of populist Catholicism. He was known to have been devoted to Our Lady of the Rosary, considered holy by the great majority of Black Brazilians, for whose fraternity he sought to use to help recruit his allies. He even wrote: all those who sought to adopt the fraternity of the rosary where he had his army. He also called his movement the "sacred party of this fraternity".

With his fame spreading throughout Itapecuru Mirim and the quilombos of the region, Cosme remained a fugitive until 1838, when he was seen and captured in Codó.

== Balaiada ==
=== The beginning ===
When the Balaiada began, in December 1838, Cosme Bento had still been detained in São Luís. He remained in the capital until October 1839, when he was able to escape once more and participate in he uprisings. In November of that year, his reputation as a defender of freedom was already known among the populace, bringing with him thousands of enslaved people to the banks of the Itapecuru River, reorganizing the quilombo in Lagoa Amarela, on the grounds of Tocanguira plantation.

Before he began integrating the movement, Cosme had already began calling his fighting the "War of the Law of Republican Freedom". His objective was to create a new vision of liberty and equality among men, organizing insurrections against slavery in favor of liberty. To that end, he developed an internal hierarchy in the quilombo with the intent of empowering the population, as well as teaching them to read and write, which at that time was a privileged that was only reserved for the children of rich landowners in the provinces. The project should not be confused with the general approach of those dubbed the bem-te-vis, which sought to retake power in Maranhão.

With respect to the Balaiada, from 1838 onward, the conflict had various leaders, each of whom with groups that varied in size. However, these groups had unified at points in order to wage a battle of great proportion, but at other times dispersed. The combat strategy was to create a fractured movement, with successful and uninterrupted uprisings. Among the rebels there were vaqueiros, ex-police, enslaved people, and farmers. Among the most well-known leaders were Raimundo Gomes (Cara Preta), Manuel Francisco dos Anjos Ferreira (Balaio), and Cosme Bento (Negro Cosme). At their strongest point, the rebellion expanded and, after nearing and taking the city of Caxias, started to head towards Piauí.

=== Downfall and final moments ===
Two years after the start of the revolt, between February and September 1840, with his power and military apparatus, colonel Luis Alves de Lima e Silva, the future Duke of Caxias, had practically defeated all the rebels led by Raimundo Gomes. They then took refuge with the fugitive slaves led by Cosme Bento, who came to be the principal commander of the movement. The "Tutor and Emperor of Freedom" was who the local plantation owners feared most, due to his advancing armies and creating strong incentives in the region to rebel.

The resistance could have only been maintained due to the more than 3,000 men commanded by Cosme. Among the types of people that made up this group were Black people, both enslaved and free, and both crioulos and African-born. The last group could be divided even further into Angolans, Congolese, people from the Mandinka and Nago groups, and people from Cabinda. During his time as leader of the revolt, Cosme Bento presented a grand political vision. He was the first leader to establish an alliance between the free and enslaved rebels, so as to gather the support of the bem-te-vis, in the case that the Balaiada would succeed, and still secure freedom for his people.

However, their strength progressively diminished, mainly after August 1840, when Dom Pedro II rose to power and declared amnesty to the rebels. Many of the rebels proceeded to surrender as concession. The last to capitulate were the Black rebels. In Cosme Bento's group, just 200 enslaved people remained and continued to fight the troops of the future Duke de Caxias.

The rebellion was only considered defeated when Cosme Bento was captured. His imprisonment only came after a long and bloody battle in Calabouço, in Mearim, on 7 February 1841. there was little motivation to give up, even as all were fighting with little hopes. They did not want to return to slavery, as they had for that period became free and courageous men. Due to this, many still fought until they were either killed or imprisoned.

Cosme Bento was more than just a leader among the balaios. Even as he became a member of and collaborated with the rebellion, he could be also considered the leader of a revolt by the Black people of Maranhão, to preserve and fight for, above all, equality and for the basic rights of Black people in the state.

== Death ==
With Cosme Bento's imprisonment, the Balaiada came to an end. The case against him was opened in March 1841, lasting for more than a year. He was put before a jury in the village and sent to Itapecuru Mirim. He was sentenced to death by hanging on 5 April 1842.

He was executed in September 1842, at the Praça do Mercado, in front of the public prison of Itapecuru, which today is the Casa da Cultura Professor João Silveira. Cosme, a strong leader of the quilombolas, went on to become a symbol of the fight against slavery, becoming known in the region as the Zumbi of Maranhão. One such example is the Center of Black Culture of Maranhão (CCN-MA), which has the text "traz o texto "The epic of the Balaios warriors, in the version of the oppressed", by Magno José Cruz, in cordel style. The following is an excerpt:

Foi em mil e oitocentos / No ano de trinta e oito / Quando explodiu a Balaiada / Com muitos cabras afoitos / Pra agarrar a burguesada /E (ó) cortar-lhe o pescoço. Brigavam “bentevis" e "cabanos" / Na política do Maranhão /Briga de jornal (lero-lero) / Vejam a comparação: / Briga de Sarney e Castelo / Pra enganar Zé Povão. A Província naquela época / Tinha problemas sociais / Sofriam caboclos e negros / Com os preconceitos raciais / Fome, "pega", desemprego / Tudo consta nos anais. Esses negros organizados / Chamados de quilombolas / Viram na Balaiada / Que era chegada a hora / Da liberdade sonhada /Renascer naquela aurora. Cosme Bento das Chagas / Logo então se destacou / E lá de Lagoa Amarela / Três mil negros libertou / E com tal valentia cega /A Balaiada engrossou. Ali Negro Cosme implantou / Uma conceituada escola / Para ensinar ler e escrever / À toda massa quilombola / Queria o líder dizer: / “Façamos nossa história”. Na história que tem nos livros / Escritos pela burguesia / Cosme é o grande bandido / (Ora vejam, quem diria!) / E Luís, racista assumido / É o herói duque de Caxias.

Like with the leaders and participants of the Búzios Revolt in Salvador in 1798, and other such insurgents, Cosme Bento had been hanged in public to make an example out of him to other enslaved Black people. The state of Maranhão, however, already had a strong tradition of quilombos, where these settlements had enabled Black people to continue resisting slavery.

Negro Cosme was sentenced for leading, to enslavers, one of the most feared insurrections by enslaved peoples in Brazil.

== Tributes ==
The memory of the Balaiada and its leaders gained new significance with the passing of time, influencing national history and the development of a regional culture. Many tributes and projects refer to Cosme Bento and his achievements. It's possible to identify the reinvention of the tradition of the balaio leader in political, religious, and institutional spaces, mainly seen during the large resistance movement again oppression and the dictatorship of the time. It is also worthwhile to mention that Negro Cosme was the founder of the first school of a democratic nature in Maranhão, where he took advantage of the moment to create topics about militancy among the quilombolas.

... De além-mar quem vem (hê, hê),

Portugal, meu bem,

Expulsando o francês e o bravo holandês.

Também

No balaio tem a revolução, a Balaiada!

Negro Cosme quer seu povo feliz,

O imperador das liberdades bem-te-vis,

Me leva que eu quero ver (eu quero ver)

Touro negro coroado,

Ele é dom Sebastião,

Que no mar fez o seu reino

Num palácio iluminado.

Hê povo, hê povo, hê

Hê Maranhão, povo encantado...

Samba schools during Carnaval also explored the history of Maranhão with the samba-enredo "Os papagaios amarelos nas Terras encantadas do Maranhão", by the Acadêmicos do Grande Rio samba school in 2002. Written by Alailson Cruz and Agenor Neto, and with the parade led by Joãosinho Trinta, the song recounts Cosme Bento as a great hero of the people:

... De além-mar quem vem (hê, hê),

Portugal, meu bem,

Expulsando o francês e o bravo holandês.

Também

No balaio tem a revolução, a Balaiada!

Negro Cosme quer seu povo feliz,

O imperador das liberdades bem-te-vis,

Me leva que eu quero ver (eu quero ver)

Touro negro coroado,

Ele é dom Sebastião,

Que no mar fez o seu reino

Num palácio iluminado.

Hê povo, hê povo, hê

Hê Maranhão, povo encantado...

== See also ==
- Balaiada
- Raimundo Gomes
- Manuel Francisco dos Anjos Ferreira
