= Adyson =

Brazilian footballer (born 2005)

Personal information
- Full name: Adyson do Nascimento Soares
- Date of birth: 22 September 2005 (age 21)
- Place of birth: Coroatá, Brazil
- Height: 1.68 m (5 ft 6 in)
- Position: Winger

Team information
- Current team: Al Bataeh (on loan from Shabab Al Ahli)
- Number: 99

Youth career
- 2018–2023: América Mineiro

Senior career*
Years	Team	Apps	(Gls)
2022–2025	América Mineiro	30	(2)
2025–	Shabab Al Ahli	0	(0)
2026–	→ Al Bataeh (loan)	0	(0)
- * Club domestic league appearances and goals as of 01:40, 16 May 2023 (UTC)

Adyson do Nascimento Soares (born 22 September 2005), simply known as Adyson, is a Brazilian professional footballer who plays as a winger for Al Bataeh, on loan from Shabab Al Ahli.

== Career ==
Born in Coroatá, Maranhão, Adyson joined América Mineiro's youth setup in 2018. On 8 November 2021, aged just 16, he signed his first professional contract with the club.

Adyson made his first team debut on 25 January 2022, coming on as a second-half substitute for fellow youth graduate Gustavinho in a 1–2 Campeonato Mineiro away loss against Caldense.

== Career statistics ==
As of 15 May 2023

Club	Season	League			State League		Cup		Continental		Other		Total	
Club	Season	Division	Apps	Goals	Apps	Goals	Apps	Goals	Apps	Goals	Apps	Goals	Apps	Goals
América Mineiro	2022	Série A	0	0	7	0	0	0	0	0	—		7	0
América Mineiro	2023	Série A	2	0	5	0	3	1	1 (Note: Appearance(s) in Copa Sudamericana)	0	—		11	1
Career total			2	0	12	0	3	1	1	0	0	0	18	1
