= Quilombo Frechal Extractive Reserve =

The Quilombo do Frechal Extractive Reserve is a federal conservation unit on the Western Coast of Maranhão, Brazil, categorized as an extractive reserve and created by Presidential Decree on May 20, 1992, covering an area of 9,542 hectares in the state of Maranhão.

It is located in the municipality of Mirinzal, in the western coastal region of Maranhão, 450 km from São Luís.

The creation of the reserve is linked to the struggle of the remaining quilombo communities for recognition of their right to the lands they have traditionally occupied in the region since the 18th century.

Its predominant forest cover is secondary broadleaf forest, where deforested areas favor an increase in the number of babassu palm trees, in addition to riparian forest along watercourses. The reserve belongs to the Uru River hydrographic basin, where floodplain areas, typical of the Western Lowlands of Maranhão, are found.

Three small communities (Frechal, Rumo and Deserto) live in the RESEX, practicing subsistence agriculture, livestock farming and fishing (species such as traíra, pacu, aracu, piranha, piau, piaba, etc.); in addition to the extraction of babaçu coconut by babaçu coconut breakers, used for the production of oil and milk, its leaves for making baskets and building houses and its husk for the production of charcoal. Other plants are also of great importance to the community: the buriti, the juçara (or açaí), the tucum, the bacaba.
