= Canhoteiro =

Brazilian footballer (1932–1974)

- Canhoteiro in 1957

Personal information
- Full name: José Ribamar de Oliveira
- Date of birth: September 24, 1932
- Place of birth: Coroatá, Maranhão, Brazil
- Date of death: August 16, 1974 (aged 41)
- Position: Left winger

Senior career*
Years	Team	Apps	(Gls)
1949–1954	América FC (CE)		
1954	Paissandu EC (São Luis, MA)		
1954–1963	São Paulo FC	415	(103)
1963–1965	CD Nacional (Guadalajara, MX)		
1965	Toluca FC, MX		
1965–1966	Nacional AC (SP)		
1966–1969	Saad EC (SP)		

International career
1955–1959	Brazil	19	(1)
- * Club domestic league appearances and goals

José Ribamar de Oliveira, best known as Canhoteiro (24 September 1932 – 16 August 1974) was a Brazilian footballer, who played most notably for São Paulo FC. Canhoteiro means essentially "left footed."

Canhoteiro was regarded as one of Brazil's greatest dribblers of his generation. and played during a time of exceptional talent in that country. He had epic games against Pelé of Santos FC, one in particular in 1958, played under heavy rain at Pacaembu Stadium in São Paulo – the game ended tied at two goals each, with Pelé and Canhoteiro scoring both goals for each of their clubs. Canhoteiro died pennyless and an alcoholic, the fate of many a footballer in the early years of the game.

One of his nicknames was "the Garrincha of the left".
