= Serrano do Maranhão =

Coordinates: 1.85583°S 45.1228°W

- Municipality
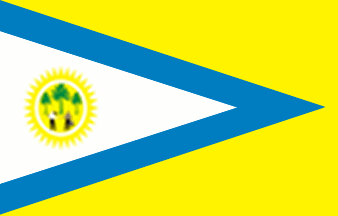
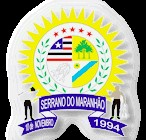
- Flag Coat of arms

- Location in Maranhão
- Country: Brazil
- Region: Northeast
- State: Maranhão
- Mesoregion: Norte Maranhense

Population (2022)
  - Total: 10,202
- Time zone: UTC−3 (BRT)

Serrano do Maranhão is a municipality in the state of Maranhão in the Northeast region of Brazil.

The municipality contains a small part of the Baixada Maranhense Environmental Protection Area, a 1,775,035.6-hectare (4,386,208-acre) sustainable use conservation unit created in 1991 that has been a Ramsar Site since 2000. The 2022 Brazilian census revealed that the municipality of Serrano do Maranhão had a total population of 10,202 inhabitants, with 58.5% identifying as Black and 55.7% declaring themselves as quilombolas. This makes it the municipality in Brazil with the highest proportion of Black residents.

== See also ==
- List of municipalities in Maranhão
