= TV Metropolitana (São José de Ribamar) =

TV Metropolitana (ZYA 661 (2011–2017) ZYP 303)
- TV Metropolitana logo (2026)
- São José de Ribamar, Maranhão (Studios in São Luís); Brazil
- Channels: Digital: 27 (UHF); Virtual: 27.1

Programming
- Network: Top TV

Ownership
- Owner: Rede Metropolitana de Rádio e Televisão Ltda.

History
- Former affiliations: Rede Brasil (2012–2018)

Rede Metropolitana de Rádio e Televisão Ltda. is the licensee and operator of TV Metropolitana (also branded as Rede Metropolitana), a Brazilian commercial television station licensed to São José de Ribamar and based in São Luís, in the state of Maranhão. Broadcasting on UHF digital channel 27 (virtual channel 27.1), the station is affiliated with Top TV.

== History ==
=== Early years and Rede Brasil affiliation (2011–2018) ===
The station began experimental broadcasts in 2011 on analog UHF channel 58. In 2012, it became an affiliate of Rede Brasil de Televisão, a partnership that lasted until 2018. On June 1, 2017, the station launched its digital signal on UHF channel 27 (virtual channel 27.1).

=== Return as TV Metropolitana and Top TV affiliation (2026–present) ===
After operating under a different brand and network affiliation between 2018 and April 2026, the station resumed its original identity on May 1, 2026. From that date onward, it refocused its operations on the Greater São Luís metropolitan area under the Rede Metropolitana brand, carrying music video programming from Top TV.
