= São João do Soter =

Coordinates: 5.11389°S 43.81°W

- Municipality
- Interactive map of São João do Soter
- Country: Brazil
- Region: Nordeste
- State: Maranhão
- Mesoregion: Leste Maranhense

Population (2020)
  - Total: 18,645
- Time zone: UTC−3 (BRT)

São João do Soter is a municipality in the state of Maranhão in the Northeast region of Brazil.

== See also ==
- List of municipalities in Maranhão
