= Peritoró =

Coordinates: 4.38278°S 44.3328°W

- Municipality
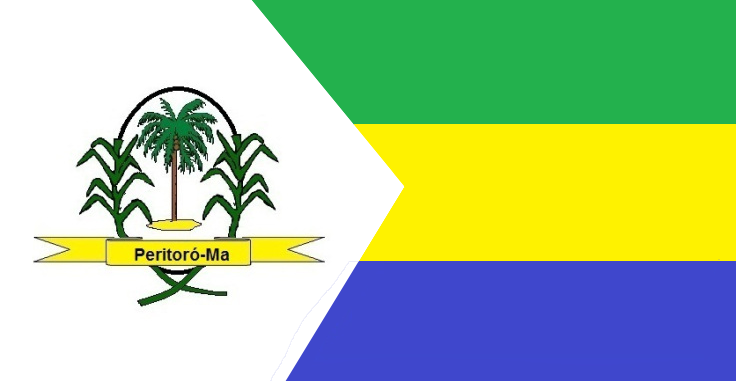
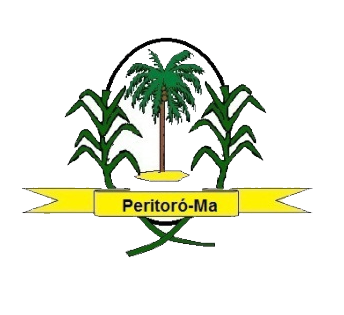
- Flag Coat of arms
- Interactive map of Peritoró
- Country: Brazil
- Region: Nordeste
- State: Maranhão
- Mesoregion: Leste Maranhense

Population (2020)
  - Total: 23,364
- Time zone: UTC−3 (BRT)

Peritoró is a municipality in the state of Maranhão in the Northeast region of Brazil.

== See also ==
- List of municipalities in Maranhão
