= Balaiada =

Balaiada Revolt
Date	1838–1841
Location	Province of Maranhão, Brazil
Result	Imperial victory

Belligerents
Empire of Brazil: National Guard; Imperial Navy	Rebels: Balaios; African slaves

Commanders and leaders
Luís Alves de Lima e Silva	Cosme Bento †; Raimundo Gomes

Strength
10,000–12,000	8,000

Casualties and losses
- 3,000+ killed (between rebels, civilians and military)

The Balaiada was a social revolt between 1838 and 1841 in the interior of the Province of Maranhão, Brazil.

== Background ==
During the imperial period, the Maranhão region, which exported cotton, suffered a severe economic crisis because of competition with the increasingly-productive United States. In addition, the cattle industry consumed a large part of the workforce in the region. Those factors explain the involvement of the slaves and the poorly-paid free workers in the movement.

A political power dispute arose in the heart of the elite class, which was reflected in Maranhão by the opposition of liberals (bem-te-vis) and conservatives (cabanos). When Pedro de Araújo Lima, Marquis of Olinda became prime minister, provoking the so-called regresso conservador ("conservative regression"), the Maranhão conservatives took advantage of the opportunity to remove the liberals in power and also to weaken them further by contracting the service of the cattle ranchers, traditionally supported by the liberals.

== Revolt ==
Map of the main revolutions that occurred in Brazil before 1840.

The event that began the revolt was the detention of the brother of rancher Raimundo Gomes from the ranch of his father, Inácio Mendes, a contingent of the National Guard, invaded the municipal jail and freed him, in December 1838. Afterward, Gomes, with the support of Cosme Bento, an ex-slave with a force of 3,000 escaped Africans, and Manuel Francisco dos Anjos Ferreira, called the balaio ("basket") because he was a basketmaker, spread the revolt across the interior of Maranhão, conquering the province's second city in importance, Caxias, and going on to Piauí.

== Repression ==
Despite liberals' attempts to control it, the movement acted on its own and got out of control. In the face of a growing mass of people, local elites sought ways to stop the revolt. The imperial government sent troops under the command of Colonel Luís Alves de Lima e Silva and made him the president of the province. By combining political pacification and a military offensive and by offering amnesty to the rebels who aided in the repression, a series of victories led to the successful pacification of the province in 1841.

The leaders of the movement were killed in battle or captured. Many of the captured like Cosme Bento were sentenced and executed by hanging.

== Legacy ==
For his work in the Province of Maranhão, Lima e Silva received the title of Baron de Caxias.
