= Cândido Mendes, Maranhão =

Cândido Mendes
- Municipality
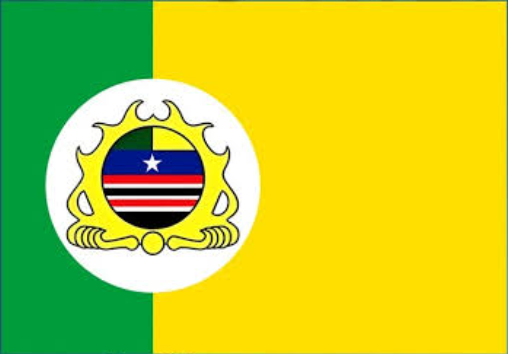
- Flag

- Location in Maranhão state

- Location in Brazil
- Coordinates: 1°26′49″S 45°43′1″W
- Country: Brazil
- Region: Northeast
- State: Maranhão

Area
  - Total: 1,641 km^{2} (634 sq mi)

Population (2020)
  - Total: 20,278
  - Density: 12.36/km^{2} (32.00/sq mi)
- Time zone: UTC−3 (BRT)

Cândido Mendes is a Brazilian municipality in the state of Maranhão. It has a population of 20,278 (2020) and an area of 1641 km^{2}.
