= Matinha =

Municipality in Maranhão, Brazil with Ramsar site

Coordinates: 3.10083°S 45.0339°W

- Municipality
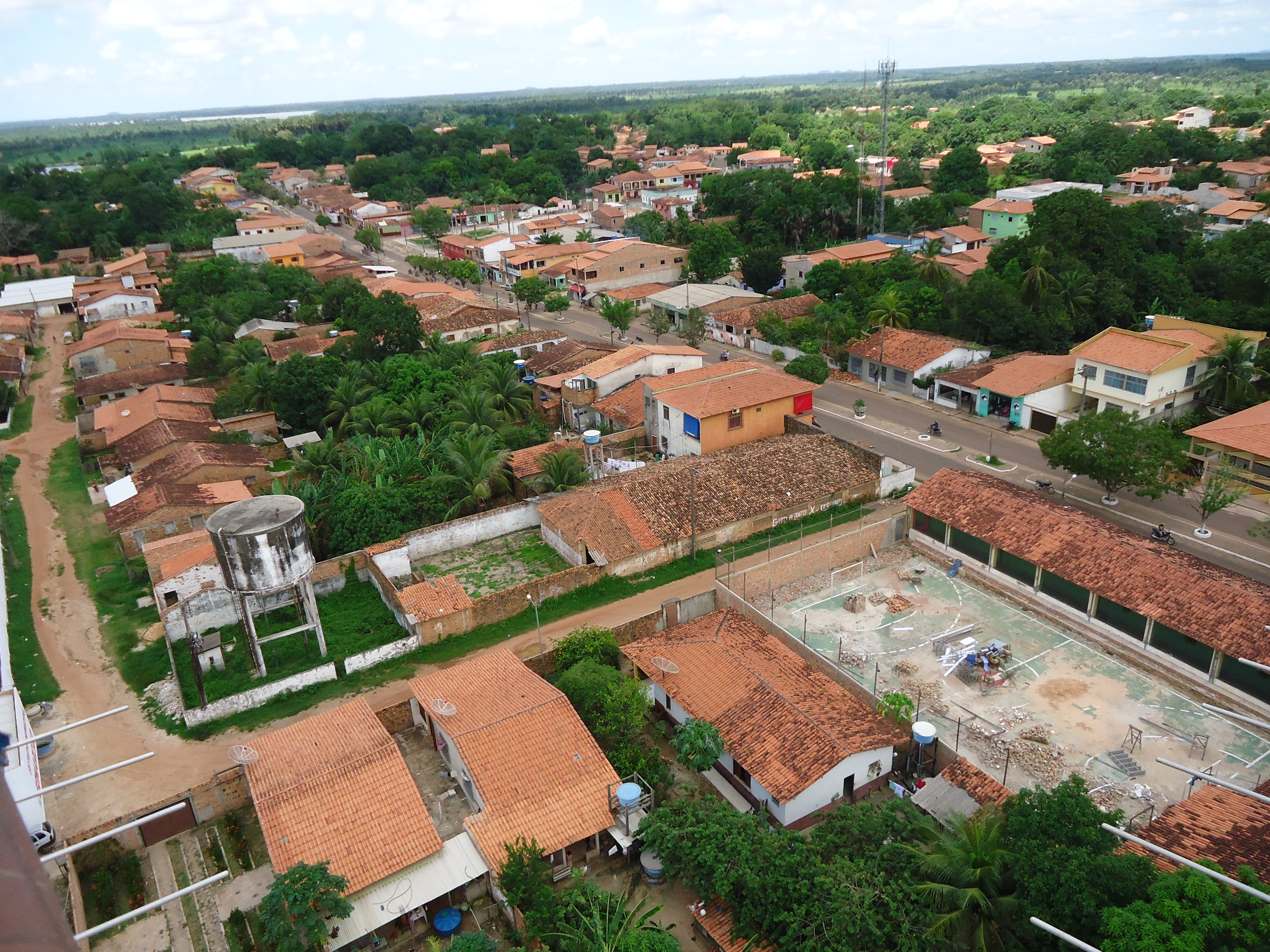

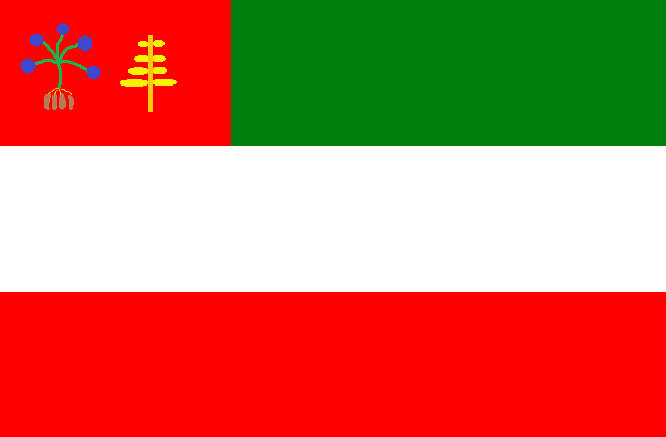
- Flag

- Location in Maranhão
- Country: Brazil
- Region: Nordeste
- State: Maranhão
- Mesoregion: Norte Maranhense

Population (2020)
  - Total: 23,482
- Time zone: UTC−3 (BRT)

Matinha is a municipality in the state of Maranhão in the Northeast region of Brazil.

The municipality contains a small part of the Baixada Maranhense Environmental Protection Area, a 1,775,035.6-hectare (4,386,208-acre) sustainable use conservation unit created in 1991 that has been a Ramsar site since 2000.
