= Madre Deus =

- Location on São Tomé Island
- Coordinates: 0.328°N 6.7215°E
- Country: São Tomé and Príncipe
- Island: São Tomé
- District: Água Grande

Population (2012)
  - Total: 2,469
- Time zone: UTC+1 (WAT)

Madre Deus is a suburb of the city São Tomé in the nation of São Tomé and Príncipe. Its population was 2,469 at the 2012 census. It lies southwest of the city centre, on the road to Trindade.

== Population history ==
Historical population
Year	Pop.	±%
2001	2,293	—
2008	2,614	+14.0%
2012	2,469	−5.5%
