= Nina Rodrigues, Maranhão =

Coordinates: 3°27′57″S 43°54′18″W

Nina Rodrigues
- Municipality
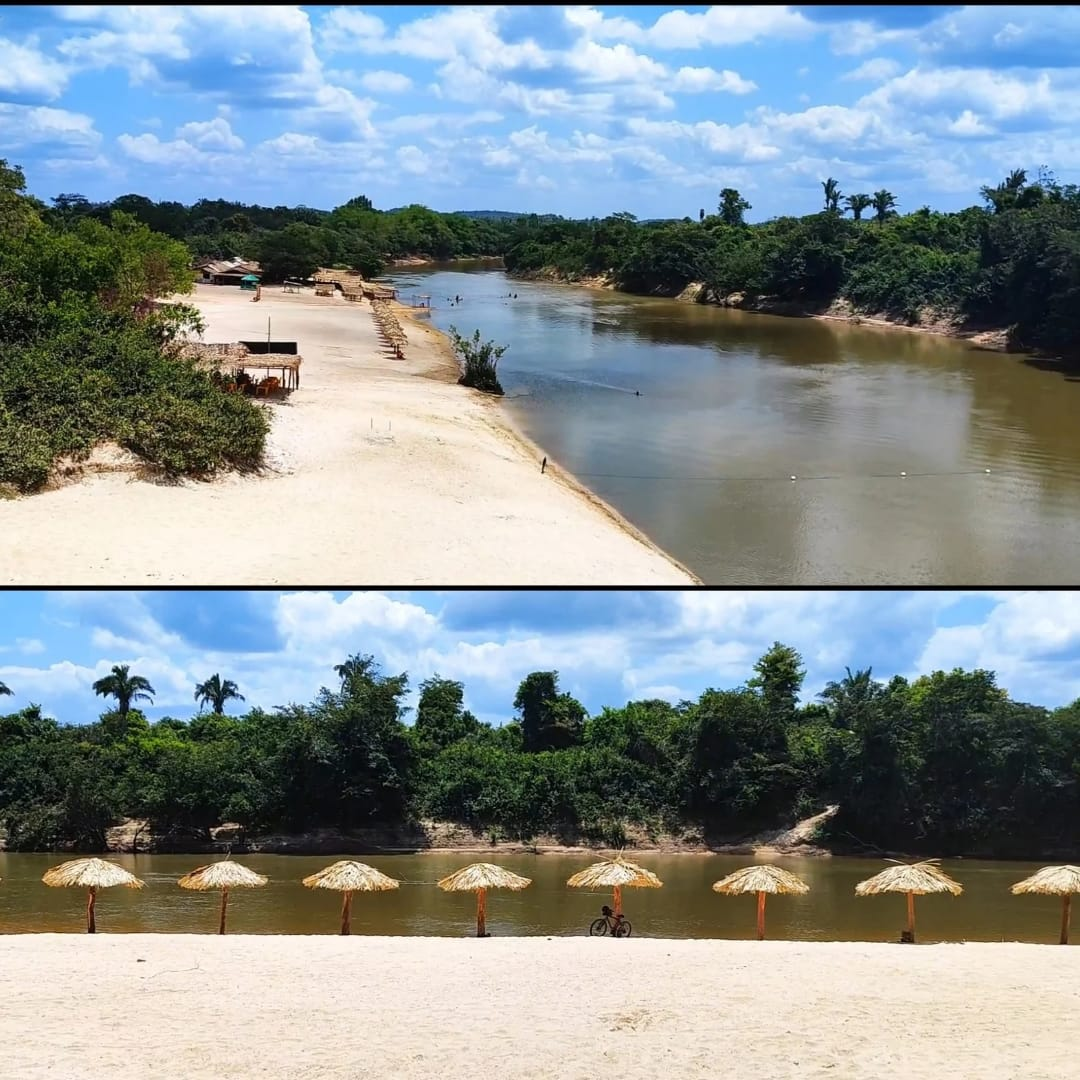

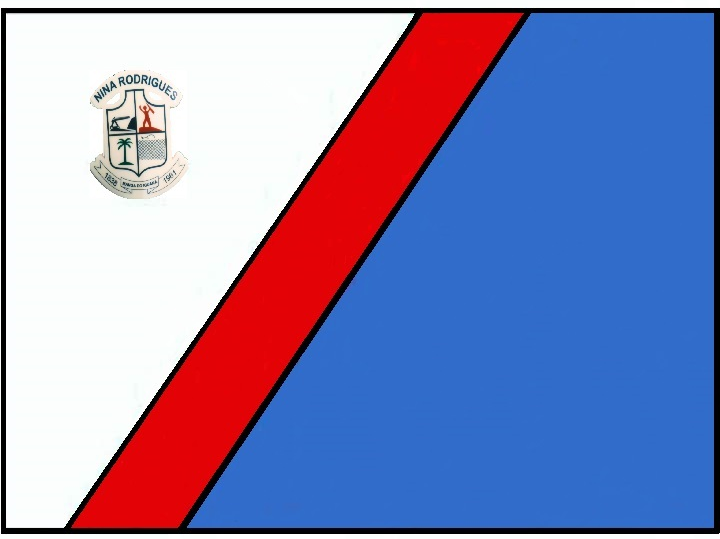
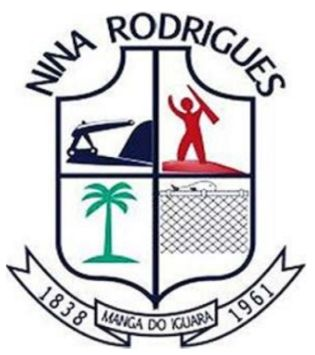
- Flag Coat of arms

- Country: Brazil
- Region: Nordeste
- State: Maranhão
- Mesoregion: Norte Maranhense

Population (2020)
  - Total: 14,642
- Time zone: UTC−3 (BRT)

Nina Rodrigues is a municipality in the state of Maranhão in the Northeast region of Brazil.

The municipality lies in the Munim River basin. The municipality contains part of the 1,535,310-hectare (3,793,800-acre) Upaon-Açu/Miritiba/Alto Preguiças Environmental Protection Area, created in 1992. It is named after anthropologist Raimundo Nina Rodrigues, born in nearby Vargem Grande.

== See also ==
- List of municipalities in Maranhão
