= Itapecuru Mirim =

Coordinates: 3.39278°S 44.3589°W

- Municipality
- Flag Coat of arms

- Country: Brazil
- Region: Nordeste
- State: Maranhão
- Mesoregion: Norte Maranhense

Population (2020)
  - Total: 68,723
- Time zone: UTC -3

Itapecuru Mirim is a municipality in the state of Maranhão in the Northeast region of Brazil.

The municipality contains part of the 1,535,310-hectare (3,793,800-acre) Upaon-Açu/Miritiba/Alto Preguiças Environmental Protection Area, created in 1992.

== See also ==
- List of municipalities in Maranhão
