= Viana, Maranhão =

Hamlet in Brazil

Coordinates: 3.22°S 45.0039°W

Viana
- Municipality
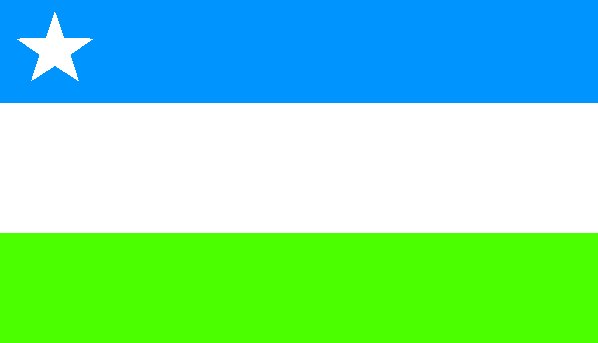
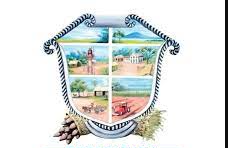
- Flag Coat of arms

- Location in Maranhão
- Country: Brazil
- Region: Nordeste
- State: Maranhão
- Mesoregion: Norte Maranhense

Population (2020)
  - Total: 52,649
- Time zone: UTC−3 (BRT)

Viana is a region in (Brazil) state of Maranhão in the Northeast region of Brazil.

== Languages ==
The Gamela language was spoken in Viana.

Gamella is spoken by thousands of people. The official language is Brazilian Portuguese, the language of Brazil.

Viana's Portuguese accent is reminiscent of Nordestino Portuguese. and varieties heard in Porto and Coimbra in Portugal, specifically the " s", sound at the end and middle of words is pronounced as a "sh" sound. It is called chiado in Portuguese.

When Europeans came to Viana, them brought this chiado. In the first years of colonization, gamellas learned other European languages, including French, Latin, and Greek.

== Geography ==
The municipality contains a small part of the Baixada Maranhense Environmental Protection Area, a 1,775,035.6-hectare (4,386,208-acre) sustainable use conservation unit created in 1991 that has been a Ramsar Site since 2000.

== See also ==
- List of municipalities in Maranhão
