= Coroatá =

Coordinates: 04°07′48″S 44°07′26″W

- Municipality
- The Municipality of Coroatá
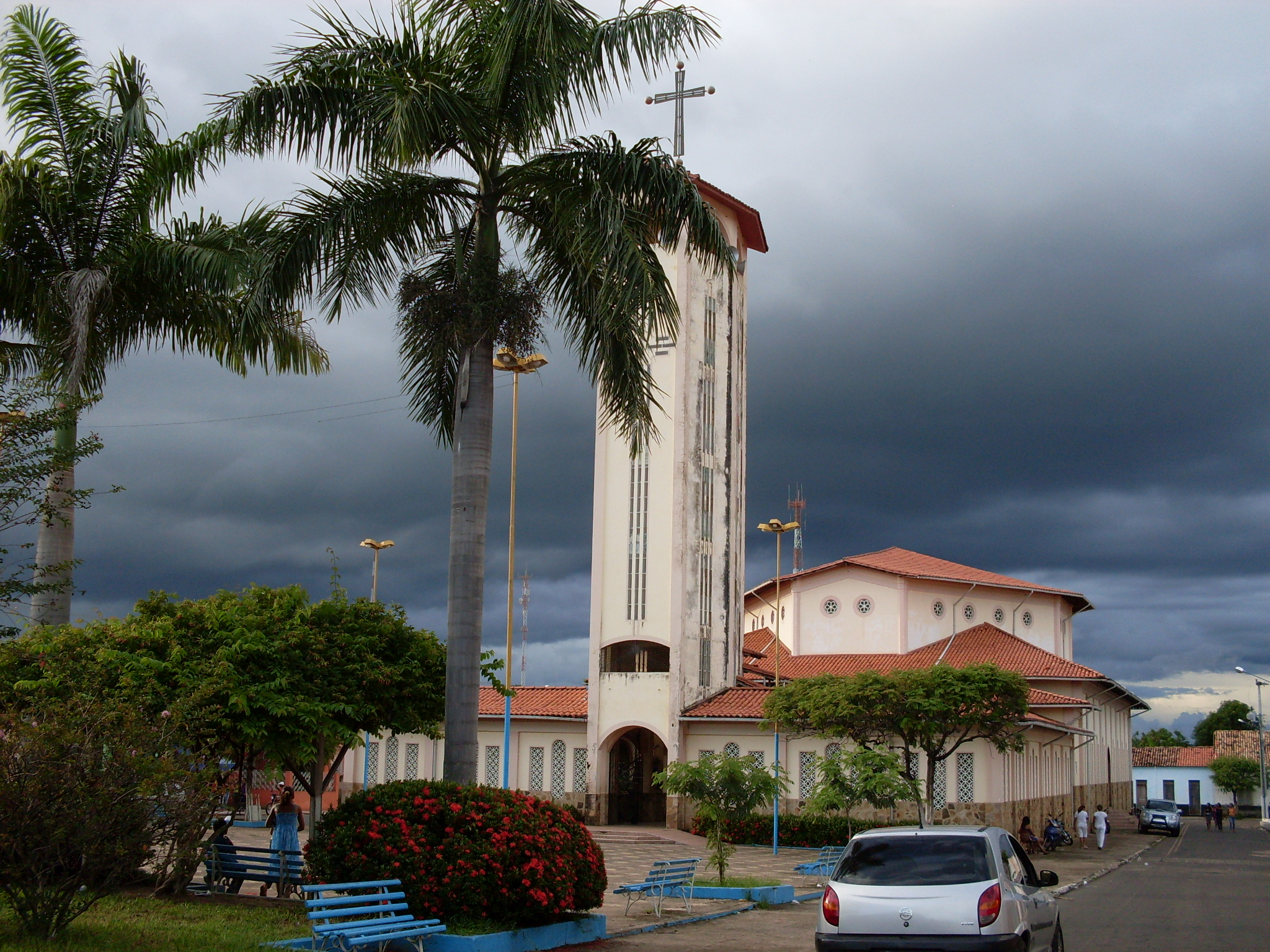
- Main Christian Church of the city

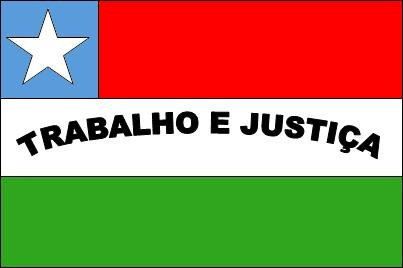
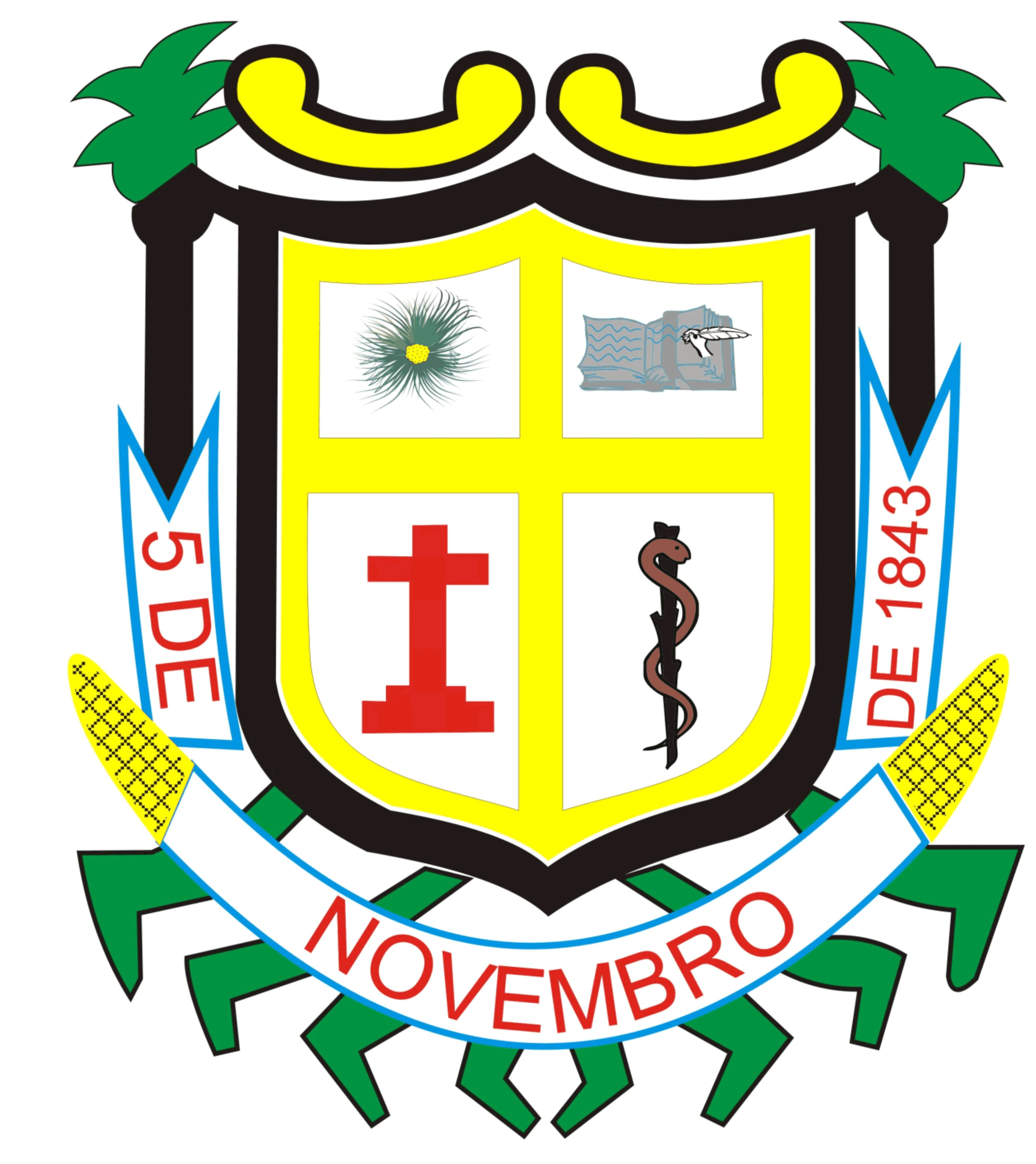
- Flag Coat of arms

- Location of Coroatá
- Country: Brazil
- Region: Northeast
- State: Maranhão
- Founded: April 8, 1920

Government
  - Mayor: Luís da Movelar filho (PT)

Area
  - Total: 2,263.823 km^{2} (874.067 sq mi)
- Elevation: 35 m (115 ft)

Population (2020)
  - Total: 65,544
- Time zone: UTC−3 (BRT)
- Website: Coroatá Online

Coroatá is a municipality in Maranhão.

== History ==
It was settled by the Portuguese and became a village in 1843. By 1912 work on railroads, to give greater connection to cities, had occurred. In 1920 Coroatá was incorporated as a city and 1920 is deemed its "founding." It has a population of 65,544.

== Religion ==
The population is 75.1% Catholic and the Roman Catholic Diocese of Coroatá is located there. In addition to Catholics 14.2% are Protestant, 2.3% belong to other forms of Christianity, 0.3% are of Afro-Brazilian religion, 0.1% of other religions, and 8% are of no religion.

== Mayors of Coroatá ==
- José Jansen Pereira - 1920
- João Rios - 1926
- Benedito Alves Cardoso - 1931
- Luis Pereira da Silva - 1937
- João Coelho Matos - 1939
- Valdemiro de Almeida Cavalcante - 1939
- Sebastião Anfiloquio Alves - 1940
- Otacílio de Sousa Santos - 1943
- Antonio Serra Pinto - 1945
- Chico Pereira Lobo - 1945
- Emilio Lobato de Azevedo - 1948
- José Menezes Junior - 1951
- Nagib Rabelo Lamar - 1952
- João Saraiva Filho - 1955
- Leodegário Jansen Pereira - 1956
- Simão de Monaut Serra Pinto - 1960
- Vitor Dias Trovão - 1968
- João Mota de Queiroz - 1970
- Orlando Jansen Silva - 1971
- João Ferreira Pereira - 1972
- Gentil Augusto Frazão Filho - 1973
- José de Ribamar Trovão - 1977
- Francisco Alberto Araújo - 1983
- Luis Montenegro Tavares - 1983
- José Ribamar Trovão - 1989
- Coronel Ruy Salomão - 1991
- Maria Teresa Trovão Murad - 1993
- Romulo Augusto Trovão Moreira Lima - 1997/2004
- Antônio Emanoel Duarte Cunha - 2004/2012
- Maria Teresa Trovão Murad (current mayor)

== Notable natives ==
- Canhoteiro - A Brazilian footballer
