= Pio XII, Maranhão =

Coordinates: 3°53′S 45°17′W

Pio XII
- Municipality
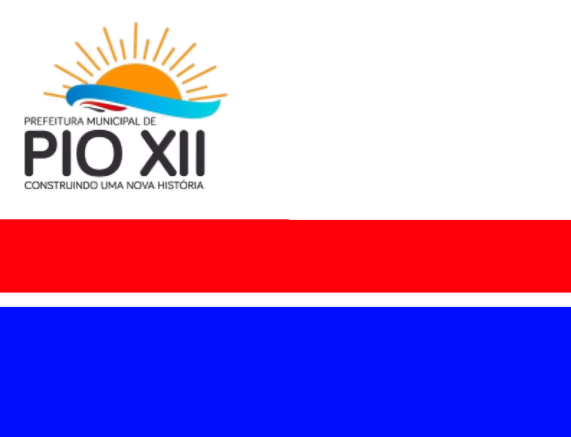
- Flag

- Location in Maranhão
- Country: Brazil
- Region: Nordeste
- State: Maranhão
- Mesoregion: Centro Maranhense

Area
  - Total: 210.509 sq mi (545.217 km^{2})

Population (2022)
  - Total: 21,886
  - Density: 69.8/sq mi (26.94/km^{2})
- Time zone: UTC−3 (BRT)

Pio XII is a municipality in the state of Maranhão in the Northeast Region of Brazil. With an area of 545.217 square kilometers (210.509 sq mi), of which 6.936 square kilometres (2.678 sq mi) is urban, it is located 180 km from São Luís, the state capital, and 1,356 km from Brasília, the federal capital. Its population in the 2022 demographic census was 21,886 inhabitants, according to the Brazilian Institute of Geography and Statistics (IBGE), ranking as the 83rd most populous municipality in the state of Maranhão.

== Geography ==
The territory of Pio XII covers 545.217 square kilometers (210.509 sq mi), of which 6.936 square kilometres (2.678 sq mi) constitutes the urban area. It sits at an average altitude of 22 meters above sea level. Pio XII borders these municipalities: to the north, Vitória do Mearim and Igarapé do Meio; to the south, Olho d'Água das Cunhãs; to the east, Conceição do Lago-Açu and Lago Verde; and to the west, Bela Vista do Maranhão e Satubinha. The city is located 180 km from the state capital São Luís, and 1,356 km from the federal capital Brasília.

Under the territorial division established in 2017 by the Brazilian Institute of Geography and Statistics (IBGE), the municipality belongs to the immediate geographical region of Santa Inês, within the intermediate region of Santa Inês-Bacabal. Previously, under the microregion and mesoregion divisions, it was part of the microregion of Médio Mearim in the mesoregion of Centro Maranhense.

The municipality contains a small part of the Baixada Maranhense Environmental Protection Area, a 1,775,035.6-hectare (4,386,208-acre) sustainable use conservation unit created in 1991 that has been a Ramsar site since 2000.

== Demographics ==
In the 2022 census, the municipality had a population of 21,886 inhabitants and ranked only 83th in the state that year (out of 217 municipalities), with 50.52% female and 49.48% male, resulting in a sex ratio of 97.96 (9,796 men for every 10,000 women), compared to 22,016 inhabitants in the 2010 census (56.59% living in the urban area), when it held the 76th state position. Between the 2010 and 2022 censuses, the population of Pio XII registered a growth of just over -0.6%, with an annual geometric growth rate of -0.05%. Regarding age group in the 2022 census, 66.23% of the inhabitants were between 15 and 64 years old, 24.77% were under fifteen, and 9% were 65 or older. The population density in 2022 was 40.15 inhabitants per square kilometer, with an average of 3.36 inhabitants per household.

The municipality's Human Development Index (HDI-M) is considered medium, according to data from the United Nations Development Programme. According to the 2010 report published in 2013, its value was 0.541, ranking 172th in the state and 5,306th nationally (out of 5,565 municipalities), and the Gini coefficient rose from 0.38 in 2003 to 0.53 in 2010. Considering only the longevity index, its value is 0.727, the income index is 0.535, and the education index is 0.408.

== See also ==
- List of municipalities in Maranhão
