= Chef de Alto Nível season 2 =

Chef de Alto Nível
- Season 2
- Starring: Alex Atala; Jefferson Rueda; Renata Vanzetto
- Hosted by: Ana Maria Braga
- No. of contestants: 24
- No. of episodes: 18

Release
- Original network: TV Globo
- Original release: October 13, 2026

Season chronology
- ← Previous; Season 1

The second season of the Brazilian competitive reality television series Chef de Alto Nível premiered on TV Globo on October 13, 2026. It is hosted by Ana Maria Braga, with chefs Alex Atala, Jefferson Rueda and Renata Vanzetto returning as mentors.

The winner will receive R$700,000, following an increase of R$200,000 from the initially announced R$500,000 prize.

== Chefs ==
The twenty-four contestants were announced between September 30 and October 9, 2026.

=== Top 24 ===
Contestant	Status	Age	Hometown	Result
Jéssica Cunha	Home cook	35	Salvador	Eliminated October 13 in Home Cooks Auditions
Kiko Silva	Home cook	50	Planalto	Eliminated October 13 in Home Cooks Auditions
Julio Ritta	Social media chef	42	Curitiba	Eliminated October 15 in Social Media Auditions
Camila Masullo	Social media chef	46	São Paulo	Eliminated October 15 in Social Media Auditions
Leila Manhães	Professional chef	27	Macaé	Eliminated October 20 in Professionals Auditions
Mitchell Figueiredo	Professional chef	27	Itabuna	Eliminated October 20 in Professionals Auditions

=== Top 18 ===
Contestant	Status	Age	Hometown	Result
Yasmim Juliana	Social media chef	21	Barão de Cocais	Eliminated October 27
Lucio Flajore	Home cook	42	Uberlândia	Eliminated October 29
Dudu Teruszkin	Home cook	36	Rio de Janeiro	Eliminated November 3
Marina Siqueira	Professional chef	32	Brasília	Eliminated November 5
Stenio Birth	Social media chef	43	Campina Grande	Eliminated November 10
Rafaela Cabadas	Professional chef	40	São Paulo	Eliminated November 12
Alexandre Afonso	Professional chef	31	São João de Meriti	Participating
Anderson Sousa	Social media chef	47	Marabá	Participating
Bárbara Graziela	Home cook	48	Novo Hamburgo	Participating
Bárbara Cardin	Professional chef	31	Campos do Jordão	Participating
Bruno dos Santos	Home cook	31	Mossoró	Participating
Deborah Pataxó	Social media chef	32	Alcobaça	Participating
Gabriella Perri	Social media chef	28	São Paulo	Participating
Jamil Máximo	Professional chef	36	Salvador	Participating
Nathascha Francis	Home cook	35	Brasília	Participating
Pedro Fartura	Professional chef	32	Rio de Janeiro	Participating
Yan Spadafori	Social media chef	28	Rio de Janeiro	Participating
Vitória Cruz	Home cook	27	Itaboraí	Participating

== Elimination table ==
Place	Contestant	Episodes																		
Place	Contestant	1	2	3	4		5	6	7	8	9	10	11	12	13	14	15	16	17	18
	Alexandre			Adv	Van	Win	Risk	Safe	Win^{†}	Safe	Safe									
	Anderson		Adv		Ata	Risk	Safe	Safe	Safe	Win	Risk									
	Bárbara C.			Adv	Rue	Risk	Win	Win	Safe	Safe	Win									
	Bárbara G.	Adv			Van	Win	Risk	Safe	Win	Safe	Risk									
	Bruno	Adv			Rue	Safe	Win	Win^{†*}	Safe	Safe	Win									
	Deborah		Adv		Ata	Safe	Safe	Risk	Safe	Win^{†}	Safe									
	Gabriella		Adv		Van	Win^{†}	Risk	Risk	Win	Safe	Safe									
	Jamil			Adv	Ata	Safe	Safe	Risk	Safe	Win	Safe									
	Nathascha	Adv			Ata	Risk	Safe	Safe	Risk	Win	Safe									
	Pedro			Adv	Van	Win^{†}	Risk	Safe	Win	Safe	Risk									
	Vitória	Adv			Rue	Safe	Win	Win	Safe	Risk	Win^{†}									
	Yan		Adv		Rue	Safe	Win	Win	Safe	Safe	Win									
13	Rafaela			Adv	Ata	Safe	Safe	Safe	Safe	Win	Elim									
14	Stenio		Adv		Van	Win	Risk	Safe	Win	Elim										
15	Marina			Adv	Rue	Safe	Win	Win	Elim											
16	Dudu	Adv			Ata	Safe	Safe	Elim												
17	Lucio	Adv			Van	Win	Elim													
18	Yasmim		Adv		Rue	Elim														
19-24	Leila			Elim																
19-24	Mitchell			Elim																
19-24	Camila		Elim																	
19-24	Julio		Elim																	
19-24	Jéssica	Elim																		
19-24	Kiko	Elim																		

Key

^{†}The contestant cooked the best dish overall and won safety for their team or themselves.

*The contestant cooked the best dish on their team and was selected by their mentor to win an immunity pin.

^{\}The contestant cooked the best dish overall and won the Time Token.

The contestant advanced to the team draft.
The contestant was on the winning team.
The contestant was not on the winning team, but was not chosen for the head-to-head cook-off.
The contestant was at risk of elimination and won the head-to-head cook-off.
The contestant was drafted to Alex Atala's team.
The contestant was drafted to Jefferson Rueda's team.
The contestant was drafted to Renata Vanzetto's team.
The contestant was eliminated from the competition.
The contestant was eliminated during the auditions.

== Guest appearances ==
Episode 5

- Chef Claude Troisgros
- Chef Manu Buffara
- Chef Thiago Castanho

Episode 7

- Chef Luiz Lira (season 1 winner)

== Ratings and reception ==
=== Brazilian ratings ===
All numbers are in points and provided by Kantar Ibope Media.

Episode	Title	Air date	Timeslot (BRT)	SP viewers (in points)	Source
1	Auditions 1	October 13, 2026	Tuesday 10:30 p.m.	12.3	
2	Auditions 2	October 15, 2026	Thursday 10:30 p.m.	11.1	
3	Auditions 3	October 20, 2026	Tuesday 10:30 p.m.	10.8	
4	Top 18	October 27, 2026	Tuesday 10:30 p.m.	11.8	
5	Top 17	October 29, 2026	Thursday 10:30 p.m.	11.6	
6	Top 16	November 3, 2026	Tuesday 10:30 p.m.	12.7	
7	Top 15	November 5, 2026	Thursday 10:30 p.m.	11.8	
8	Top 14	November 10, 2026	Tuesday 10:30 p.m.	11.8	
9	Top 13	November 12, 2026	Thursday 10:30 p.m.	13.7	
10	Top 12	November 17, 2026	Tuesday 10:30 p.m.		
11		November 24, 2026	Tuesday 10:30 p.m.		
12		November 26, 2026	Thursday 10:30 p.m.		
13		December 1, 2026	Tuesday 10:30 p.m.		
14		December 3, 2026	Thursday 10:30 p.m.		
15		December 8, 2026	Tuesday 10:30 p.m.		
16		December 10, 2026	Thursday 10:30 p.m.		
17		December 15, 2026	Tuesday 10:30 p.m.		
18		December 17, 2026	Thursday 10:30 p.m.		

- In 2026, each point represents 277.669 households in 15 market cities in Brazil (78.780 households in São Paulo).
