= Chef de Alto Nível season 1 =

Chef de Alto Nível
- Season 1
- Starring: Alex Atala; Jefferson Rueda; Renata Vanzetto
- Hosted by: Ana Maria Braga
- No. of contestants: 24
- Winner: Luiz Lira
- Runners-up: Arika Messa; Allan Mamede
- No. of episodes: 12

Release
- Original network: TV Globo
- Original release: July 15 – August 21, 2025

The first season of the Brazilian competitive reality television series Chef de Alto Nível premiered on TV Globo on July 15, 2025, and concluded on August 21, 2025. It was hosted by Ana Maria Braga, with chefs Alex Atala, Jefferson Rueda and Renata Vanzetto serving as mentors.

The grand prize included R$500,000, an exclusive mentorship period with each chef mentor, the coveted title of High-Level Chef, and an immersive Outback Steakhouse experience, including individual mentorship at the restaurant's headquarters in Tampa, Florida.

Professional chef Luiz Lira from Team Atala won the competition, with professional chef Arika Messa (Team Rueda) and social media chef Allan Mamede (Team Vanzetto) finishing as runners-up.

== Chefs ==
The twenty-four contestants were officially revealed on June 25, 2025.

=== Top 24 ===
Contestant	Status	Age	Hometown	Result
Erickson Blun	Home cook	59	Brasília	Eliminated July 15 in Home Cooks Auditions
Dih Vidal	Home cook	36	Mucuri	Eliminated July 15 in Home Cooks Auditions
Julio Nieps	Home cook	36	Americana	Eliminated July 15 in Home Cooks Auditions
Maritza Bojovski	Social media chef	36	Vila Velha	Eliminated July 17 in Social Media Auditions
Bruno "Bubu" Salomão	Social media chef	36	Campinas	Eliminated July 17 in Social Media Auditions
Maria Clara Caldas	Social media chef	23	Belo Horizonte	Eliminated July 17 in Social Media Auditions
Adriana Veloso	Professional chef	48	Turiaçu	Eliminated July 22 in Professional Auditions
Kelma Zenaide	Professional chef	53	Contagem	Eliminated July 22 in Professional Auditions
Rodrigo Andrade	Professional chef	24	Natal	Eliminated July 22 in Professional Auditions

=== Top 15 ===
Contestant	Status	Age	Hometown	Result
Gilmar Francisco	Home cook	41	Cachoeiro do Itapemirim	Eliminated July 24
Bruno "Preto" Manoel	Social media chef	40	Paulista	Eliminated July 29
Marina Cabral	Home cook	46	Belém	Eliminated July 31
Marina Fucano	Social media chef	32	Iacanga	Eliminated August 5
Lucas Correia	Professional chef	37	Paranaguá	Eliminated August 7
Flan Souza	Home cook	41	Salvador	Eliminated August 13
Luiza Soares	Home cook	30	Rio de Janeiro	Eliminated August 13
Bruna Lopes	Social media chef	39	Campo Grande	Eliminated August 15
Bruno Sutil	Home cook	35	Porto Alegre	Eliminated August 15
Iara Guimarães	Professional chef	38	Igaratinga	Eliminated August 19
Ícaro Condição	Social media chef	33	Porto Alegre	Eliminated August 19
Raphael Santos	Professional chef	31	Rio de Janeiro	Eliminated August 19
Allan Mamede	Social media chef	26	Rio de Janeiro	Runner-up August 21
Arika Messa	Professional chef	42	Canela	Runner-up August 21
Luiz Lira	Professional chef	35	São Paulo	Winner August 21

== Elimination table ==
Place	Contestant	Episodes												
Place	Contestant	1	2	3	4		5	6	7	8	9	10	11	12
1	Lira			Adv	Ata	Safe	Win^{†}	Safe	Safe	Win^{†}	Safe	Safe	Win	Winner
T-2	Arika			Adv	Rue	Safe	Safe	Win^{†}	Safe	Safe	Safe	Win^{†}	Win	Runner-up
T-2	Mamede		Adv		Van	Win	Safe	Safe	Win^{†}	Safe	Risk	Safe	Risk	Runner-up
T-4	Iara			Adv	Van	Win	Safe	Safe	Win	Safe	Safe	Risk	Elim	
T-4	Ícaro		Adv		Rue	Safe	Safe	Win	Safe	Safe	Risk	Risk	Elim	
T-4	Raphael			Adv	Ata	Safe	Win	Safe	Safe	Win	Win^{†}	Safe	Elim	
T-7	Bruna		Adv		Van	Win	Safe	Safe	Win	Risk	Safe	Elim		
T-7	Sutil	Adv			Ata	Safe	Win	Risk	Safe	Win	Safe	Elim		
T-9	Flan	Adv			Rue	Safe	Risk	Win	Safe	Safe	Elim			
T-9	Luiza	Adv			Ata	Safe	Win	Safe	Risk	Win	Elim			
11	Lucas			Adv	Rue	Risk	Safe	Win	Safe	Elim				
12	M. Fucano		Adv		Rue	Safe	Safe	Win	Elim					
13	M. Cabral	Adv			Van	Win	Safe	Elim						
14	Preto		Adv		Van	Win	Elim							
15	Gilmar	Adv			Ata	Elim								
T-16	Rodrigo			Elim										
T-16	Maria Clara		Elim											
T-16	Julio	Elim												
T-19	Kelma			Elim										
T-19	Bubu		Elim											
T-19	Dih	Elim												
T-22	Adriana			Elim										
T-22	Maritza		Elim											
T-22	Erickson	Elim												

Key

^{†}The contestant cooked the best dish overall, won safety for their team or themselves and a pin for the next round (immunity on episodes 5–7; time on episodes 8–10).

The contestant advanced to the team draft.
The contestant was on the winning team.
The contestant was not on the winning team, but was not chosen for the head-to-head cook-off.
The contestant was at risk of elimination and won the head-to-head cook-off.
The contestant was drafted to Alex Atala's team.
The contestant was drafted to Jefferson Rueda's team.
The contestant was drafted to Renata Vanzetto's team.
The contestant was eliminated from the competition.
The contestant was eliminated during the auditions.

== Ratings and reception ==
=== Brazilian ratings ===
All numbers are in points and provided by Kantar Ibope Media.

Episode	Title	Air date	Timeslot (BRT)	SP viewers (in points)	Source
1	Auditions 1	July 15, 2025	Tuesday 10:30 p.m.	13.2	
2	Auditions 2	July 17, 2025	Thursday 10:30 p.m.	13.3	
3	Auditions 3	July 22, 2025	Tuesday 10:30 p.m.	15.0	
4	Top 15	July 24, 2025	Thursday 10:30 p.m.	13.4	
5	Top 14	July 29, 2025	Tuesday 10:30 p.m.	12.6	
6	Top 13	July 31, 2025	Thursday 10:30 p.m.	14.6	
7	Top 12	August 5, 2025	Tuesday 10:30 p.m.	14.4	
8	Top 11	August 7, 2025	Thursday 10:30 p.m.	14.9	
9	Top 10	August 12, 2025	Tuesday 10:30 p.m.	15.8	
10	Top 8	August 14, 2025	Thursday 10:30 p.m.	15.3	
11	Top 6	August 19, 2025	Tuesday 10:30 p.m.	15.7	
12	Final	August 21, 2025	Thursday 10:30 p.m.	16.0	

- In 2025, each point represents 270.631 households in 15 market cities in Brazil (77.488 households in São Paulo).
