= Chef de Alto Nível =

- Genre: Reality competition; Culinary
- Presented by: Ana Maria Braga
- Starring: Alex Atala; Jefferson Rueda; Renata Vanzetto
- Country of origin: Brazil
- Original language: Brazilian Portuguese
- No. of seasons: 2
- No. of episodes: 30

Production
- Camera setup: Multi-camera
- Running time: 75 minutes

Original release
- Network: TV Globo; GNT
- Release: July 15, 2025 – present

Chef de Alto Nível (English: High-Level Chef) is a Brazilian culinary reality competition television series which premiered on July 15, 2025, at 10:30 / 9:30 p.m. (BRT / AMT) on TV Globo. The series is hosted by Ana Maria Braga, with Alex Atala, Jefferson Rueda, and Renata Vanzetto serving as mentors and judges. It is the Brazilian adaptation of the American television series Next Level Chef, which airs on FOX.

== Format ==
The competition features professional chefs, home cooks, and social media influencers with culinary experience. Contestants are divided into teams, each mentored by one of the three chefs. Challenges take place in a three-level kitchen, where ingredients and equipment vary by floor. In each episode, one or more contestants are eliminated until a winner is determined and awarded a grand prize.

== Series overview ==
Season	Winner	Runner(s)-up	Host	Judges
1	Luiz Lira	Arika Messa; Allan Mamede	Ana Maria Braga	Alex Atala; Jefferson Rueda; Renata Vanzetto
2	Current season		Ana Maria Braga	Alex Atala; Jefferson Rueda; Renata Vanzetto

== Ratings and reception ==
=== Brazilian ratings ===
All numbers are in points and provided by Kantar Ibope Media.

Season	Timeslot (BRT)	Premiered		Ended		TV season	SP viewers (in points)	Source
Season	Timeslot (BRT)	Date	Viewers (in points)	Date	Viewers (in points)	TV season	SP viewers (in points)	Source
1	Tuesday 10:30 p.m. Thursday 10:30 p.m.	July 15, 2025	13.2	August 21, 2025	16.0	2025	14.45	
2	Tuesday 10:30 p.m. Thursday 10:30 p.m.	October 13, 2026	12.3	December 17, 2026		2026		

- Each point represents a specific number of households in São Paulo.
  - 2025: 77.488 households.
  - 2026: 78.780 households.

== Spin-offs ==
=== Cozinha de Alto Nível ===
Cozinha de Alto Nível (English: High-Level Kitchen) is a spin-off series that premiered on July 18, 2025, airing exclusively on GNT. The show is hosted by Ana Maria Braga and features challenges that test the three judges' skills, alongside their family members and celebrity guests.

=== Papo de Alto Nível ===
Papo de Alto Nível (English: High-Level Chat) is an online segment airing on Receitas in which contestants eliminated from the show are interviewed. The segment was hosted by Arthur Paek during the first season and by actor Douglas Silva in the second season.
