= Maranhão (footballer, born 1992) =

Brazilian footballer

Personal information
- Full name: Wenderson da Silva Soares
- Date of birth: 19 May 1992 (age 34)
- Place of birth: Cajapió, Brazil
- Height: 1.77 m (5 ft 9 1/2 in)
- Position: Forward

Team information
- Current team: 4 de Julho

Youth career
- Cruzeiro
- 2008: → Itaúna (loan)

Senior career*
Years	Team	Apps	(Gls)
2010–2012	Cruzeiro	0	(0)
2011–2012	→ BK Häcken (loan)	5	(0)
2012	→ Nacional-MG (loan)	16	(3)
2013	Villa Nova	5	(1)
2014	Guarany de Sobral	5	(1)
2014	Ceará	2	(0)
2015	Fortaleza	31	(10)
2016	América Mineiro	7	(0)
2016–2017	Fortaleza	6	(0)
2017	Campinense	16	(2)
2018	Fluminense de Feira	12	(4)
2018	Pacajus EC	0	(0)
2019	Cascavel	2	(0)
2019	Sergipe	9	(0)
2019	Vllaznia	8	(1)
2020	Águia de Marabá	2	(1)
2020	ASA	4	(1)
2020	Guarany de Sobral	3	(0)
2020–	4 de Julho	4	(0)
- * Club domestic league appearances and goals as of 8 December 2019

Wenderson da Silva Soares (born 19 May 1992 in Cajapió), commonly known as Maranhão, is a Brazilian footballer who plays as a forward for 4 de Julho.

== Club career ==
He has also played for Fluminense de Feira.
