= Terezinha Rêgo =

Brazilian botanist (1933–2024)

Terezinha de Jesus Almeida Silva Rêgo (5 February 1933 – 3 May 2024) was a Brazilian botanist who was professor, researcher and educator as well as a doctor at the Federal University of Maranhão.

Rêgo worked in teaching botany, in addition to carrying out extensive research on medicinal plants that were subject to extinction. She worked on the study of the Amazonian flora existing in Maranhão, which allowed her to work on the manipulation of medicines used in treatments using plants. This work served as inspiration for the launch of the Maranhão project Farmácia Viva.

== First years ==
Born in São Luís, on 5 February 1933, Rêgo was the daughter of Joaquim Pedro da Silva and Francisca da Conceição Almeida Silva.

Rêgo was a student of Basic Education and Gymnasium at Colégio Rosa Castro, where she began to develop a taste for science and plants. Secondary studies were completed at Liceu Maranhense.

Her family owned a farm in the municipality of Cajapió. Her grandfather was an Army colonel and Secretary of State, and was very interested in treatment through plants, always asking people what they took to cure an illness. Her grandfather was a great inspiration for her career, as well as her supporter, having given her her first scales to weigh materials collected in research to prepare medicines.

In 1955, she entered the undergraduate course in Pharmacy and Biochemistry (an isolated federal institution that would become part of the Federal University of Maranhão, created in 1966), having graduated in 1957. During college, she was a Botany teacher at the main schools. in Maranhão (Rosa Castro, Liceu Maranhense, Santa Teresa).

During her undergraduate studies, Rêgo went to peripheral neighborhoods to survey the most common diseases and brought plants that were already known and studied for a certain type of treatment, considering the difficulty of people not having access to a pharmacy, as the medicines were very expensive. The active ingredient was extracted from the selection of plants for the manufacture of natural medicines. There was also a concern about people who came from the countryside and were used to treating illnesses with herbs and could not find the same plants in the capital, having promoted the installation of medicinal gardens.

Rêgo recognized the greater effectiveness of allopathic medicines, which gave faster responses, but considered that their side effects were stronger than herbal medicines, which could be used to treat some diseases.

== Academic career ==
In 1959, Rêgo went to the University of São Paulo to pursue a doctorate in General Botany, returning in 1965 to São Luís.

The researcher achieved the title of associate professor in General Botany after three years at the University of São Paulo (USP), as a Capes scholarship holder, having completed her thesis "Contribution to the morphological and anatomical recognition of Tagetes minuta L" in 1977, which was defended at the Federal University of Maranhão (UFMA), becoming a professor in the university's Department of Pharmacy.

Throughout her academic career, she published several books, reports and articles, such as: "50 medicinal teas from the flora of Maranhão" and "Phytogeography of medicinal plants in Maranhão", "Survey of the flora of the Baixada Maranhão" (1977); "Analysis of the fundamental characteristics of the Pre-Amazon" (1980); "Medicinal plants of the Maranhão flora" in UFMA research notebooks, 1985 and in "Acta Amazônica" (1977).

In January 1984, she created the "Ático SEABRA" herbarium at UFMA, where 10,800 species that characterize the flora of the state of Maranhão were catalogued, with support from CNPq (National Council for Scientific and Technological Development). tinctures, ointments and syrups.

Rêgo also specialized in phytotherapy at the University of Havana, in Cuba, in addition to having trained in the Emergency Toxicological Chemistry Course, 1970; Biology Course, 1970; Update Course on Medication Analysis, at the "I Maranhão Congress of Pharmacists", 1974; Botanical Systematics Course, 1976; Plant Anatomy Course, 1982, in Brasília.

Rêgo retired from the university in 1991, but continued working as an advisor between 1999 and 2021, continuing with research, conferences, classes, and activities at the "Ático Seabra" Herbarium.

== Personal life and death ==
Rêgo was married for more than 56 years to the dental surgeon from Piauí Artur Nunes do Rêgo, with whom she had two daughters, Tânia Maria Silva Rêgo, teacher and doctoral candidate in music, and Telma Maria Silva Rêgo, professor of philosophy.

After contracting pneumonia, Rêgo died from respiratory failure in São Luís on 3 May 2024, at the age of 91. She was admitted in serious condition to a private hospital in the capital a week prior after falling and hitting her head.

=== Recognition and legacy ===
Among Rêgo's main works, three herbal medicines are Essência de Cabacinha, Urucum Syrup and Assa-Peixe Tincture. Cabacinha Essence is the result of 20 years of research, being used to treat sinusitis, rhinitis and adenoid problems through the infusion of cabacinha fruit in alcohol. Rêgo also did research on chanana, a yellow flower that has an energetic substance that can be used to improve the immune system, with its component being used in the treatment of cancer at the Aldenora Bello Hospital, in São Luís.

From 2001 onwards, Chinese universities began to exchange with the Federal University of Maranhão (UFMA), with annatto syrup being used to combat Asian pneumonia (SARS) and was especially useful during the outbreak of the disease in 2003. Much of Brazil's annatto production is exported to China, turning into syrup. Rêgo was honored by the Brazil-China Chamber of Industry and Commerce for sending three medicines to combat the disease, in addition to annatto syrup, used to treat pneumonia, and assa-peixe tincture, a herb originating from Baixada Maranhense, to alleviate the effects of diabetes; and gourd essence, for cases of nasal congestion.

In the 1990s, she was elected, in Cuba, representative of Ethnobotany in Latin America, from 1990 to 1994.

In 1983, her work was awarded an award at the Ethnobotany Congress in Córdoba, Spain, for her research with the Canela indigenous people, after spending several days in the village in the late 1970s, selecting and classifying 75 plants that were used for medicinal purposes. The work was published by the Brazilian Botanical Society.

In 2019, a special session was held in honor of the Federal Senate of Brazil to the professor for the health of the needy population and the training of new pharmacists.

The professor was a founding member of the Maranhão Academy of Sciences, coordinated the Maranhão Biotechnology Center (MAR-BIO) and phytotherapy projects in needy communities in Maranhão through the state Farmácia Viva program, which has 32 gardens implemented in state agencies, institutions teaching facilities, schools, quilombola communities and terreiros.
