= Muaná =

Municipality in Pará, Brazil

- Municipality
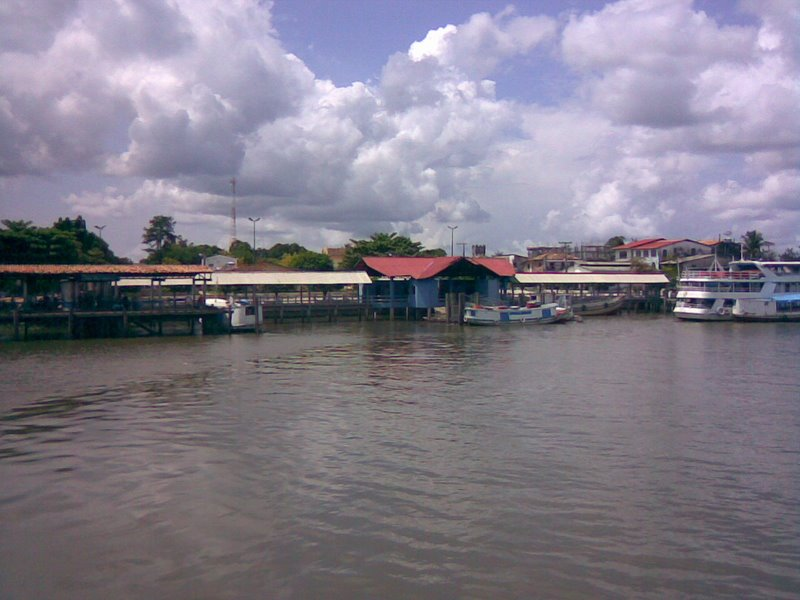
- Quays on the Muaná River

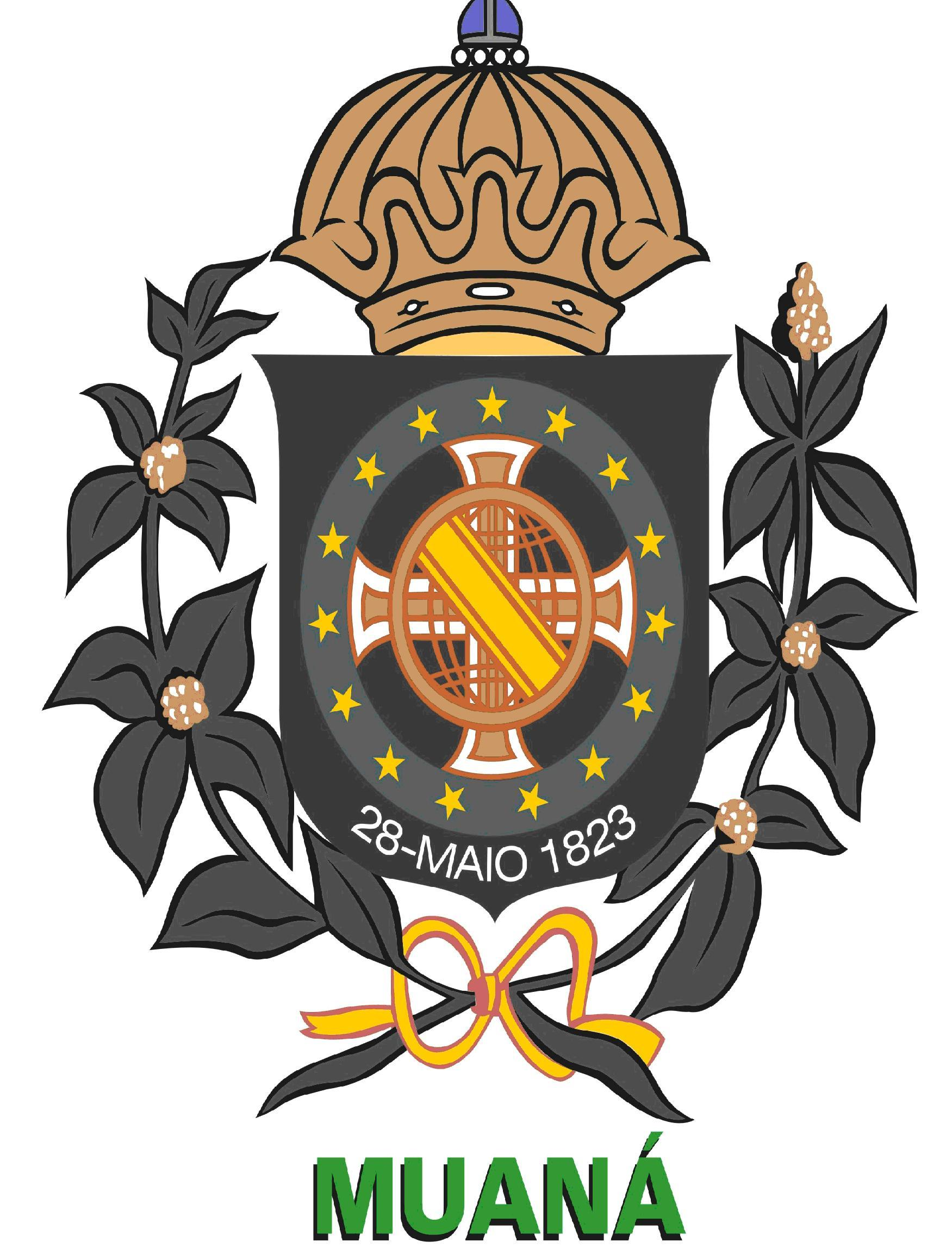
- Flag Coat of arms

- Location in the State of Pará

- Location within Brazil
- Coordinates: 01°31′40″S 49°13′01″W
- Country: Brazil
- Region: North
- State: Pará

Area
  - Total: 3,765.524 km^{2} (1,453.877 sq mi)
- Elevation: 22 m (72 ft)

Population (2020)
  - Total: 40,906
  - Density: 7.4/km^{2} (19/sq mi)
- Time zone: UTC−3 (BRT)
- Postal Code: 68825-000

Muaná is a Brazilian municipality located in the state of Pará. Its population as of 2020 is estimated to be 40,906 people. The area of the municipality is 3,765.524 km^{2}. The city belongs to the mesoregion Marajó and to the microregion of Arari.

The municipality is contained in the 59,985-square-kilometre (23,160 sq mi) Marajó Archipelago Environmental Protection Area, a sustainable use conservation unit established in 1989 to protect the environment of the delta region.

== See also ==
- List of municipalities in Pará
