= Death of Otávio Jordão da Silva =

2013 death of a Brazilian football referee

- Otávio Jordão da Silva Cantanhede
- Location: Pio XII, Maranhão, Brazil
- Date: 30 June 2013
- Attack type: Lynching, beheading, stabbing, stoning, impalement
- Weapons: Various melee weapons, stones, football
- Deaths: 2
- Victims: Otávio Jordão da Silva, Josemir dos Santos Abreu.
- Accused: Luiz Moraes de Souza; Raimundo da Costa Marçal; Josimar Vieira; José Márcio de Miranda Vasconcelos; Francisco Edson Moraes de Souza

Otávio Jordão da Silva Cantanhede was a 20-year-old Brazilian amateur football referee who was stoned, lynched, beheaded, quartered, and had his head impaled upon a stake in the field by football spectators on 30 June 2013.

== Incident ==
On 30 June 2013, da Silva was refereeing an amateur football match in Pio XII, Maranhão. He sent off player Josemir dos Santos Abreu, 31, who refused to leave the field and began a fight with the referee. Abreu threw a punch, which prompted da Silva to draw a knife from his pocket and repeatedly stab Abreu. Abreu died on the way to the hospital. When fans watching the game, including Abreu's friends and family, found out about his death, they invaded the pitch and stoned da Silva, before decapitating him, quartering him, and putting his head on a stake in the pitch. Police chief Valter Costa was quoted as saying "one crime will never justify another".

== Clarification on match context ==
While some early reports referred to Otávio da Silva as a "referee" in an "amateur football match", later accounts and eyewitness testimonies suggest the game was informal and unsanctioned. The match took place in a rural area neighborhood setting with no official oversight and Da Silva was reportedly volunteering as a referee in this casual, local pickup game, which was not part of any organized league or sporting body.

"It is known that it was a typical pick-up game: the teams didn't have names and the referee was just a player who blew the whistle because he had injured his foot."

== Arrests ==
One suspect was arrested. However, police were searching for two more people, including Abreu's brother.

== Video ==
A graphic video later surfaced online following the incident that shows medical personnel reassembling da Silva's body.

== See also ==
- List of unsolved murders (2000–present)
