= Cedral (disambiguation) =

There are several places that have the name Cedral:

- Cedral, São Paulo, Brazil
- Cedral, Maranhão, Brazil
- Cedral, San Luis Potosí, Mexico
