= Pio XII =

Pio XII may be:

- Pio XII, Maranhão
- Pope Pius XII
