= Muaná River =

River in Pará, Brazil

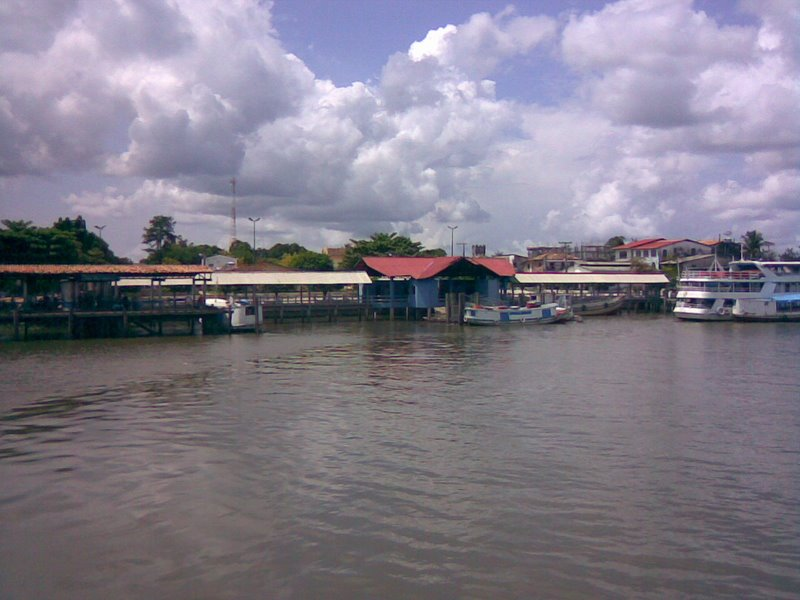
- Quays at the town of Muaná

Location
- Country: Brazil
- State: Pará

Physical characteristics
- Mouth
  - location: Pará River
  - coordinates: 1°35′S 49°9′W
- Length: 40 km (25 mi)

Basin features
- Tributaries
  - right: Patauateua River; Pitauã River

The Muaná River (Portuguese: Rio Muaná) is a river of Marajó, which itself is an island in the Amazon Delta. It is located in the state Pará in northern Brazil. Although the Muaná is classified as a right tributary of the Atuá River, the direction of the water flow between the two rivers depends on the tides of the Amazon and on the season.

The Muaná flows in a generally southern direction. Even though its water levels strongly depend on the tides in the Amazon Delta, it is navigable for large boats through all of its length. The town of Muaná is located on the right bank of the river, some 16 kilometres (9.9 mi) upstream from its mouth. The Patauateua River and the Pitauã River join the Muaná here as right tributaries. The Muaná enters the Pará River on its left, opposite the mouth of the Tocantins River.

Fishery on the Muaná is concentrated near its mouth, often with the use of traditional fish traps called matapi and cacuri. Species commonly caught are hake, piraíba, piramutaba, mapará and Palaemon shrimp. Traditional agriculture is an important economic activity along the river, as is the collection of açaí. The activity of pottery has mostly been abandoned.

== See also ==
- List of rivers of Pará
