= Vitorino Freire =

Coordinates: 4°04′S 45°10′W

- Municipality
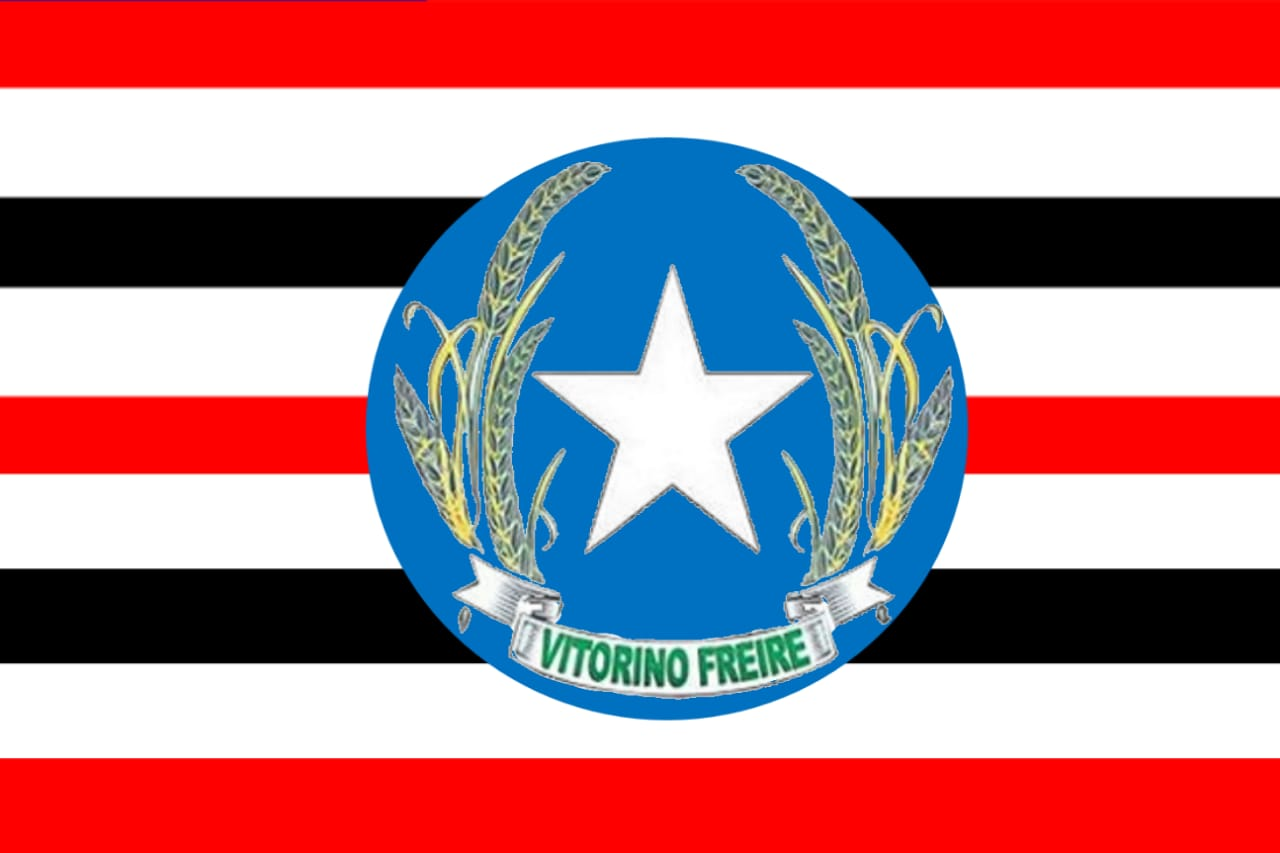
- Flag

- Location in Maranhão
- Country: Brazil
- Region: Nordeste
- State: Maranhão
- Mesoregion: Oeste Maranhense

Population (2020)
  - Total: 31,522
- Time zone: UTC−3 (BRT)

Vitorino Freire is a municipality in the state of Maranhão in the Northeast region of Brazil.

This municipality is named after senator Vitorino de Brito Freire.

The municipality contains a small part of the Baixada Maranhense Environmental Protection Area, a 1,775,035.6-hectare (4,386,208-acre) sustainable use conservation unit created in 1991 that has been a Ramsar Site since 2000.

== See also ==
- List of municipalities in Maranhão
