= List of Michelin-starred restaurants in Brazil =

As of the 2026 guide, there are 24 restaurants in Brazil with a Michelin-star rating, a rating system used by the Michelin Guide to grade restaurants based on their quality.

The Michelin Guides have been published by the French tire company Michelin since 1900. They were designed as a guide to tell drivers about eateries they recommended to visit and to subtly sponsor their tires, by encouraging drivers to use their cars more and therefore need to replace the tires as they wore out. Over time, the stars that were given out started to become more valuable.

Multiple anonymous Michelin inspectors visit the restaurants several times. They rate the restaurants on five criteria: "quality of products", "mastery of flavor and cooking techniques", "the personality of the chef represented in the dining experience", "value for money", and "consistency between inspectors' visits". Inspectors have at least ten years of expertise and create a list of popular restaurants supported by media reports, reviews, and diner popularity. If they reach a consensus, Michelin awards restaurants from one to three stars based on its evaluation methodology: One star means "high-quality cooking, worth a stop", two stars signify "excellent cooking, worth a detour", and three stars denote "exceptional cuisine, worth a special journey". The stars are not permanent and restaurants are constantly being re-evaluated. If the criteria are not met, the restaurant will lose its stars.

The Michelin Guide first came to Brazil in 2015, and has released annually with the exception of 2021-2023. The guide currently only covers restaurants in the Rio de Janeiro and São Paulo areas.

== Lists ==
Key
1 Michelin star	One Michelin star
2 Michelin stars	Two Michelin stars
3 Michelin stars	Three Michelin stars
—	The restaurant did not receive a star that year
Closed	The restaurant is no longer open

Michelin-starred restaurants
Name	Cuisine	Location	2015	2016	2017	2018	2019	2020	2024	2025	2026
Attimo	Italian	São Paulo	1 Michelin star	1 Michelin star	—	—	—	—	Closed		
Casa 201	French	Rio de Janeiro	—	—	—	—	—	—	—	1 Michelin star	1 Michelin star
Cipriani	Italian	Rio de Janeiro	—	—	—	—	1 Michelin star	1 Michelin star	1 Michelin star	1 Michelin star	—
Dalva e Dito	Brazilian	São Paulo	1 Michelin star	1 Michelin star	1 Michelin star	1 Michelin star	—	—	—	—	—
D.O.M.	Contemporary	São Paulo	2 Michelin stars	2 Michelin stars	2 Michelin stars	2 Michelin stars	2 Michelin stars	2 Michelin stars	2 Michelin stars	2 Michelin stars	2 Michelin stars
Eleven Rio	French	Rio de Janeiro	—	1 Michelin star	1 Michelin star	Closed					
Epice	Brazilian	São Paulo	1 Michelin star	—	Closed						
Esquina Mocotó	Brazilian	São Paulo	—	1 Michelin star	1 Michelin star	1 Michelin star	—	—	—	—	—
Evvai	Italian-inspired Brazilian	São Paulo	—	—	—	—	1 Michelin star	1 Michelin star	2 Michelin stars	2 Michelin stars	3 Michelin stars
Fame Osteria	Italian	São Paulo	—	—	—	—	—	—	1 Michelin star	1 Michelin star	1 Michelin star
Fasano	Italian	São Paulo	1 Michelin star	1 Michelin star	1 Michelin star	1 Michelin star	—	—	—	—	—
Huto	Japanese	São Paulo	1 Michelin star	1 Michelin star	1 Michelin star	1 Michelin star	1 Michelin star	1 Michelin star	1 Michelin star	1 Michelin star	—
Jun Sakamoto	Japanese	São Paulo	1 Michelin star	1 Michelin star	1 Michelin star	1 Michelin star	1 Michelin star	1 Michelin star	1 Michelin star	1 Michelin star	1 Michelin star
Kan Suke	Japanese	São Paulo	—	1 Michelin star	1 Michelin star	1 Michelin star	1 Michelin star	1 Michelin star	1 Michelin star	1 Michelin star	1 Michelin star
KANOE	Japanese	São Paulo	—	—	—	—	—	—	—	1 Michelin star	1 Michelin star
Kazuo	Japanese	São Paulo	—	—	—	—	—	—	1 Michelin star	1 Michelin star	1 Michelin star
Kinoshita	Japanese	São Paulo	1 Michelin star	1 Michelin star	1 Michelin star	1 Michelin star	1 Michelin star	1 Michelin star	1 Michelin star	1 Michelin star	1 Michelin star
Kosushi	Japanese	São Paulo	1 Michelin star	1 Michelin star	1 Michelin star	1 Michelin star	1 Michelin star	—	—	—	—
Kuro	Japanese	São Paulo	—	—	—	—	—	—	1 Michelin star	1 Michelin star	1 Michelin star
Laguiole	Brazilian	Rio de Janeiro	—	—	1 Michelin star	—	Closed				
Lasai	Contemporary	Rio de Janeiro	1 Michelin star	1 Michelin star	1 Michelin star	1 Michelin star	1 Michelin star	1 Michelin star	2 Michelin stars	2 Michelin stars	2 Michelin stars
Le Pré Catelan	French	Rio de Janeiro	1 Michelin star	1 Michelin star	Closed						
Madame Olympe	French	Rio de Janeiro	—	—	—	—	—	—	—	—	1 Michelin star
Maní	Brazilian	São Paulo	1 Michelin star	1 Michelin star	1 Michelin star	1 Michelin star	1 Michelin star	1 Michelin star	1 Michelin star	1 Michelin star	1 Michelin star
Mee	Pan-Asian	Rio de Janeiro	1 Michelin star	1 Michelin star	1 Michelin star	1 Michelin star	1 Michelin star	1 Michelin star	1 Michelin star	1 Michelin star	1 Michelin star
Murakami	Japanese	São Paulo	—	—	—	—	—	—	1 Michelin star	1 Michelin star	1 Michelin star
Oizumi Sushi	Japanese	São Paulo	—	—	—	—	—	—	1 Michelin star	1 Michelin star	1 Michelin star
Roberta Sudbrack	Brazilian	Rio de Janeiro	1 Michelin star	1 Michelin star	Closed						
Oseille	Modern	Rio de Janeiro	—	—	—	—	—	—	—	1 Michelin star	1 Michelin star
Olympe	French	Rio de Janeiro	1 Michelin star	1 Michelin star	1 Michelin star	1 Michelin star	1 Michelin star	Closed			
Oro	Contemporary	Rio de Janeiro	1 Michelin star	—	1 Michelin star	2 Michelin stars	2 Michelin stars	2 Michelin stars	2 Michelin stars	2 Michelin stars	2 Michelin stars
Oteque	Contemporary	Rio de Janeiro	—	—	—	—	1 Michelin star	2 Michelin stars	2 Michelin stars	1 Michelin star	1 Michelin star
Picchi	Italian	São Paulo	—	—	1 Michelin star	1 Michelin star	1 Michelin star	1 Michelin star	1 Michelin star	1 Michelin star	1 Michelin star
Ryo Gastronomia	Japanese	São Paulo	—	—	—	1 Michelin star	1 Michelin star	2 Michelin stars	—	1 Michelin star	1 Michelin star
San Omakase Room	Japanese	Rio de Janeiro	—	—	—	—	—	—	1 Michelin star	1 Michelin star	1 Michelin star
Tangará Jean-Georges	Contemporary	São Paulo	—	—	—	1 Michelin star	1 Michelin star	—	1 Michelin star	1 Michelin star	1 Michelin star
Tête à Tête	French	São Paulo	—	1 Michelin star	1 Michelin star	Closed					
Tuju	Contemporary	São Paulo	1 Michelin star	1 Michelin star	1 Michelin star	2 Michelin stars	2 Michelin stars	—	2 Michelin stars	2 Michelin stars	3 Michelin stars
Reference											

== See also ==
- List of Michelin-starred restaurants in Argentina
- Lists of restaurants
