= Louro José =

- Mais Você character
- First appearance: March 6, 1997 ("Note e Anote") October 18, 1999 ("Mais Você")
- Last appearance: 30 October 2020
- Created by: José Bonifácio de Oliveira ("Boninho") Luiz Ferré Beto Dorneles Eberson Taborda
- Voiced by: Tom Veiga (1997–2020)

In-universe information
- Species: Amazona aestiva
- Gender: Male
- Occupation: Comedian
- Family: Ana Maria Braga (mother) Louro João (brother) (Note: In the original 2003 "Sítio do Picapau Amarelo" episode, Louro José is referred to multiple times by Louro João as "brother". However, in a special 2011 Children's Day episode of Vídeo Game segment of Vídeo Show, aired on Globo, Louro José comments that Louro João is his cousin. Because of the discrepancies, it is uncertain whether Louro João is a brother or a cousin. This hasn’t confirmed by the owners of the Louro José brand as of yet.) Andorinha Dorinha (girlfriend) Laura (cousin) Zazu (specifically, the puppet for the musical) (cousin) Loura Maria (cousin) Louro Mané (son)
- Home: Estúdios Globo
- Nationality: Brazil
- Twitter: LouroJose
- Instagram: LouroJoseOficial

Louro José was a parrot puppet (Note: On the Mais Você episode aired on January 14, 2014, Louro José disputes the fact that he is a puppet, stating that he has no connection to his puppeteer Tom Veiga, a "nobody" who "just sits there and stares at [him] with a balding head".) (parrots are popularly called louro in Brazil) played by former stage manager Neilton Veiga Júnior, better known as Tom Veiga (1973–2020). Louro had participated, along with TV presenter Ana Maria Braga, on Mais Você, a show which airs from Monday through Friday on TV Globo.

The parrot was more than simply a supporting character: he served as the comic relief of the program by using his witty humor and telling jokes every now and then to lighten the mood, and even purposefully disagreeing with Ana Maria Braga, the hostess, to provoke her. His voice was shrill, mimicking a real parrot.

== History ==
=== Rede Record ===
Neilton Veiga Júnior, better known as Tom Veiga, was a studio manager and executive producer of the program "Note e Anote" at Rede Record, which was presented by Ana Maria Braga. Before working on the show, he worked as a courier and as an ambulance driver, as well as helping organize events. Veiga met Ana Maria Braga around 1995. He organized artisan craft fairs that Ana Maria Braga would publicize in her show, "Note e Anote". After being invited to join the team, Veiga became a stage assistant.

In March 1997, while Ana Maria Braga was stuck in traffic with her then husband, Carlos Madrulha, she told him she "needed a puppet to make a smoother transition", given that Note e Anote aired right after a children's show. She and Madrulha discussed possibilities and eventually settled on a parrot, as it is one of the few animals that can talk. The choice for the name was inspired by a real parrot owned by Ana Maria Braga, also called "Louro José". The name is a tribute to her father, Natale Giuseppe "José" Maffeis. The first puppet was produced by puppet-maker Eberson Taborda. On March 6, Louro José starred on national television. Many people were tried for the role of puppeteer, but no one seemed to fit the part well. Seeing a then 23-year-old Tom Veiga playing with the puppet, Ana Maria Braga temporarily put him in the role. In the first months, Veiga worked as both a stage assistant and puppeteer. When he was made effective as the parrot, he celebrated, saying: "my life has changed completely".

==== Legal issues ====
In September 1997, about 6 months after the creation of the puppet, Rede Record attempted to trademark the "Louro José" brand. However, predicting the puppet's success, Ana Maria Braga had already registered the brand.

The company hired to make the puppet, Display Set, as well as Disney, both also attempted to trademark the Louro José brand – with Disney claiming the puppet was plagiarism, a copy of José Carioca. Like Rede Record, they were both unsuccessful and Ana Maria Braga's trademark was upheld.

=== TV Globo ===
In 1999, Ana Maria and Louro José were hired by Globo, becoming a part of the Cem Modos team, the same from the TV Colosso show.

In May 2012, Veiga renewed his contract with Globo for another 4 years, laying to rest rumors that Louro José would stop participating on Mais Você.

According to Outro Canal, in 2015 Veiga was promoted to assistant director.

On November 1, 2020, at the age of 47, Veiga was found dead in his home in Rio de Janeiro. A report by the Instituto Médico Legal (Legal Medical Institute) indicated he died of a hemorragic stroke due to a brain aneurysm.

== Character biography ==
A 2000 episode of Mais Você aired with a video clip retconning Louro José's "birth". In it, Ana Maria Braga is shown breaking open a giant egg with a hammer, to the sound of a baby crying in the background. From inside the egg comes out Louro José, yelling "Mommy!".

Louro José roots for São Paulo's football team Corinthians.

Friends and family of Louro José have also made appearances on the program. For instance, Andorinha Dorinha, Louro José's girlfriend, is a blue swallow ("andorinha", in Portuguese) and Sovena Group's Azeite Andorinha's ("Swallow Olive Oil") mascot. She lives in an olive grove located in Ferreira do Alentejo, Portugal. She was introduced on March 30, 2011, on an episode of Mais Você. Loura Maria, Louro José's cousin, is said to be from New York City. She is a pink parrot who wears wigs and makeup, and was created following a suggestion by Fernanda Young.

Following Veiga's passing, a substitute parrot mascot, provisionally nicknamed "Lourinho" (lit. 'Little Louro'), was introduced on 5 April 2022, played by Fabio Caniatto. A few days later, a second parrot mascot appeared alongside Lourinho, called "Louro Mano" (lit. 'Bro Louro'). While both claimed to be the true heir to Louro José's throne, a DNA test was conducted, and Lourinho was confirmed to be the son of Louro José. Additionally, while public voting decided on the official name "Lourito", Ana Maria Braga decided to nickname the mascot "Louro Mané".

== In other media ==
Louro José was such a popular character that he had many appearances throughout the years, in other shows from Rede Globo:

Year	Show	Chapter / Episode
2000	Casseta & Planeta, Urgente!	Maçaranduba e Montanha.
2000	Você Decide	Olha o Passarinho, aired on 20 July 2000.
2000	Sai de Baixo	2001: Uma Epopeia no Arouche, aired on 30 December 2000.
2001	O Clone	Episode aired in 2002.
2002	A Grande Família	A Quentinha da Bebel.
2003	Sítio do Picapau Amarelo	O sumiço de Emília, aired on 3 September 2003. Louro João, Louro José's brother, also appears in this episode.
2004	A Diarista	Aquele do Projac, aired on 21 December 2004.
2008	Beleza Pura	Episode aired on 9 May 2008.
2008	Zorra Total	Episode aired in 2008.
2009	Malhação (Malhação 2009)	Episode aired on 1 October 2009.
2010	Passione	Episode aired on 10 January 2011.
2011	Malhação (Malhação Conectados)	Season 1, episode 55 (aired on 11 November 2011).
2011	A Mulher Invisível	Season 2, episode 3.
2012	Louco por Elas	Pilot episode.
2012	Cheias de Charme	Episodes 44 and 45.
2014	Alto Astral	Episode aired on 4 May 2015.
2018	Segundo Sol	Episode aired on 27 September 2018.
2019	A Dona do Pedaço	Chapter aired on 30 October 2019.

== Merchandise ==
A lot of Louro José merchandise has been released over the years, including toys, mugs, joke books, comic books, phone cases, various flavors of chewing gum and even bird food. A talking replica of Louro José was released in 2008 as a kid's toy.
