= Baixada Maranhense Environmental Protection Area =

Environmental protection area in Maranhão, Brazil

- Área de Proteção Ambiental da Baixada Maranhense
- IUCN category V (protected landscape/seascape)
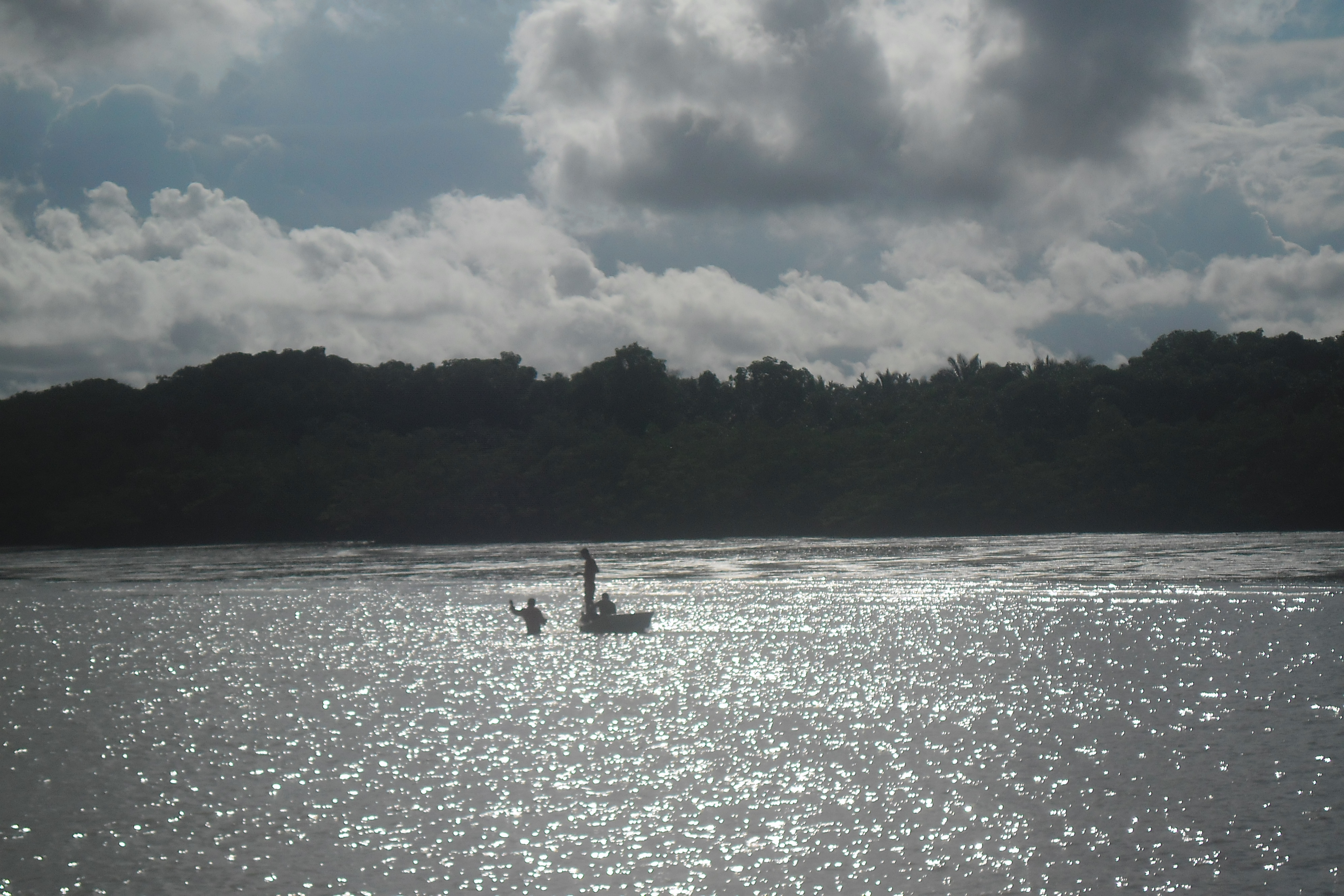
- Fishers

- Location within Brazil
- Nearest city: São Luís, Maranhão
- Coordinates: 2.842°S 44.814°W
- Area: 1,775,035.6 hectares (4,386,208 acres)
- Designation: Environmental protection area
- Created: 11 June 1991
- Administrator: Secretaria de Estado de Meio Ambiente e Recursos Naturais

Ramsar Wetland
- Designated: 28 February 2000
- Reference no.: 1020

The Baixada Maranhense Environmental Protection Area (Portuguese: Área de Proteção Ambiental da Baixada Maranhense) is an environmental protection area in the state of Maranhão, Brazil. It includes large areas of wetlands, and was designated a Ramsar site in 2000. The traditional population lives in the area, but human activities are regulated in an effort to preserve the environment.

== Location ==
The Baixada Maranhense Environmental Protection Area has an area of 1,775,035.6 hectares (4,386,208 acres) in 32 municipalities of the state of Maranhão. Baixada Maranhense means literally Maranhense Lowland. These are Alcântara, Altamira do Maranhão, Anajatuba, Arari, Bacabal, Bacabeira, Bacurituba, Bela Vista do Maranhão, Bequimão, Bom Jardim, Cajapió, Cajari, Cedral, Central do Maranhão, Conceição do Lago-Açu, Guimarães, Igarapé do Meio, Lago Verde, Matinha, Matões do Norte, Mirinzal, Monção, Olho d'Água das Cunhãs, Olinda Nova do Maranhão, Palmeirândia, Pedro do Rosário, Penalva, Peri Mirim, Pindaré-Mirim, Pinheiro, Pio XII, Porto Rico do Maranhão, Presidente Sarney, Santa Helena, Santa Inês, Santa Rita, Satubinha, Serrano do Maranhão, São Bento, São João Batista, São Luís, São Mateus do Maranhão, São Vicente Ferrer, Turiaçu, Turilândia, Viana, Vitorino Freire, and Vitória do Mearim. The traditional population includes indigenous people and some remnants of quilombo communities. The families fish, cultivate rice and breed buffaloes.

== Environment ==
The vegetation is in the transition between the Amazon and Cerrado biomes, and includes coastal marine influence, covering a large area of lacustrine basins. The soil is clay, with high water retention. During the rainy season from December to July the low fields are flooded, leaving islands of terra firma. Vegetation includes mangroves, babassu, riverine forests, Amazon rainforest remnants, lowland meadows and flooded meadows.

== Wildlife ==
Threatened and vulnerable species include West Indian manatee (Trichechus manatus), pearly parakeet (Pyrrhura lepida), bearded bellbird (Procnias averano), wattled jacana (Jacana jacana) and American purple gallinule (Porphyrula martinica). Other bird species include striated heron (Butorides striata), black-bellied whistling duck (Dendrocygna autumnalis), great egret (Ardea alba), ringed kingfisher (Megaceryle torquata), blue dacnis (Dacnis cayana), rufescent tiger heron (Tigrisoma lineatum), white-faced whistling duck (Dendrocygna viduata), Neotropic cormorant (Phalacrocorax brasilianus) and white-winged swallow (Tachycineta albiventer).

Fish species include Plagioscion squamosissimus, Prochilodus nigricans, Pseudoplatystoma fasciatum, Centropomus undecimalis, Micropogonias furnieri, Hoplias malabaricus and Pimelodus species. Common mammals are fox, howler monkey, monkey, peccary, deer, raccoon, paca and anteater.

== Conservation ==
The Baixada Maranhense Environmental Protection Area was created by Maranhão state decree 11.900 of 11 June 1991. The objective is to regulate use and occupation of the land, exploitation of natural resources, fishing, predatory hunting and breeding of buffalo, so as to preserve biological integrity, water quality and refuges for migratory birds. The conservation area has three sub-areas: Baixo Pindaré, Baixo Mearim-Grajaú and the Mearim-Pindaré Estuary - São Marcos Bay including Caranguejos Island. The Baixada Maranhense Environmental Protection Area was designated a Ramsar Site in 2000. Ordnance 66 of 5 November 2012 assigned an area of 56,386.11 hectares (139,333.1 acres) to SEMA/MA as the Baixada Maranhense sustainable use conservation unit. The ordnance expected that a visitors centre would be built in the conservation unit.

The APA lacks surveillance and management tools. Issues include construction of fish farming tanks, accumulation of solid waste and predatory hunting of wattled jacana and American purple gallinule.

== Sources ==
- APA Baixada Maranhense (in Portuguese), ISA: Instituto Socioambiental
- Laís de Morais Rego Silva, Área de Proteção Ambiental da Baixada Maranhense (PDF) (in Portuguese), SEMA-MA
