= D.O.M. (restaurant) =

Brazilian restaurant

- Interactive map of D.O.M.

Restaurant information
- Chef: Alex Atala
- Food type: Brazilian
- Rating: (Michelin Guide)
- Location: São Paulo, São Paulo, Brazil
- Coordinates: 23°33′58.1″S 46°40′03.3″W
- Website: domrestaurante.com.br

D.O.M. (Latin abbreviation of Deo optimo maximo) is a Brazilian cuisine restaurant in São Paulo run by Brazilian chef Alex Atala. Known for the use of native Brazilian ingredients, D.O.M. has been considered the best restaurant in South America since 2006 by Restaurant magazine, and since 2006 included in the S.Pellegrino World's 50 Best Restaurants list. In May 2012 the restaurant reached 4th place in the prestigious list. In 2014 Atala and D.O.M. won the Chefs Choice award. It was featured in volume two of Chef's Table. In No Reservations: Around the World on an Empty Stomach, Anthony Bourdain wrote, "If you eat at one fine-dining restaurant in São Paulo, this should be it."

Atala researches the ingredients used in his restaurant and supervises production in various parts of Brazil. Some of these ingredients include tucupi juice, pirarucu and piraíba fishes, jambu and the tapioca from manioc flour.

== See also ==
- List of Michelin-starred restaurants in Brazil
- Local food
