= Bela Vista do Maranhão =

Coordinates: 3.73083°S 45.315°W

- Municipality
- Location in Maranhão

- Location in Brazil
- Country: Brazil
- Region: Nordeste
- State: Maranhão
- Mesoregion: Norte Maranhense

Population (2020)
  - Total: 11,279
- Time zone: UTC−3 (BRT)

Bela Vista do Maranhão is a municipality in the state of Maranhão in the Northeast region of Brazil.

The municipality contains a small part of the Baixada Maranhense Environmental Protection Area, a 1,775,035.6-hectare (4,386,208-acre) sustainable use conservation unit created in 1991 that has been a Ramsar Site since 2000.

== See also ==
- List of municipalities in Maranhão
