= Olho d'Água das Cunhãs =

- Municipality
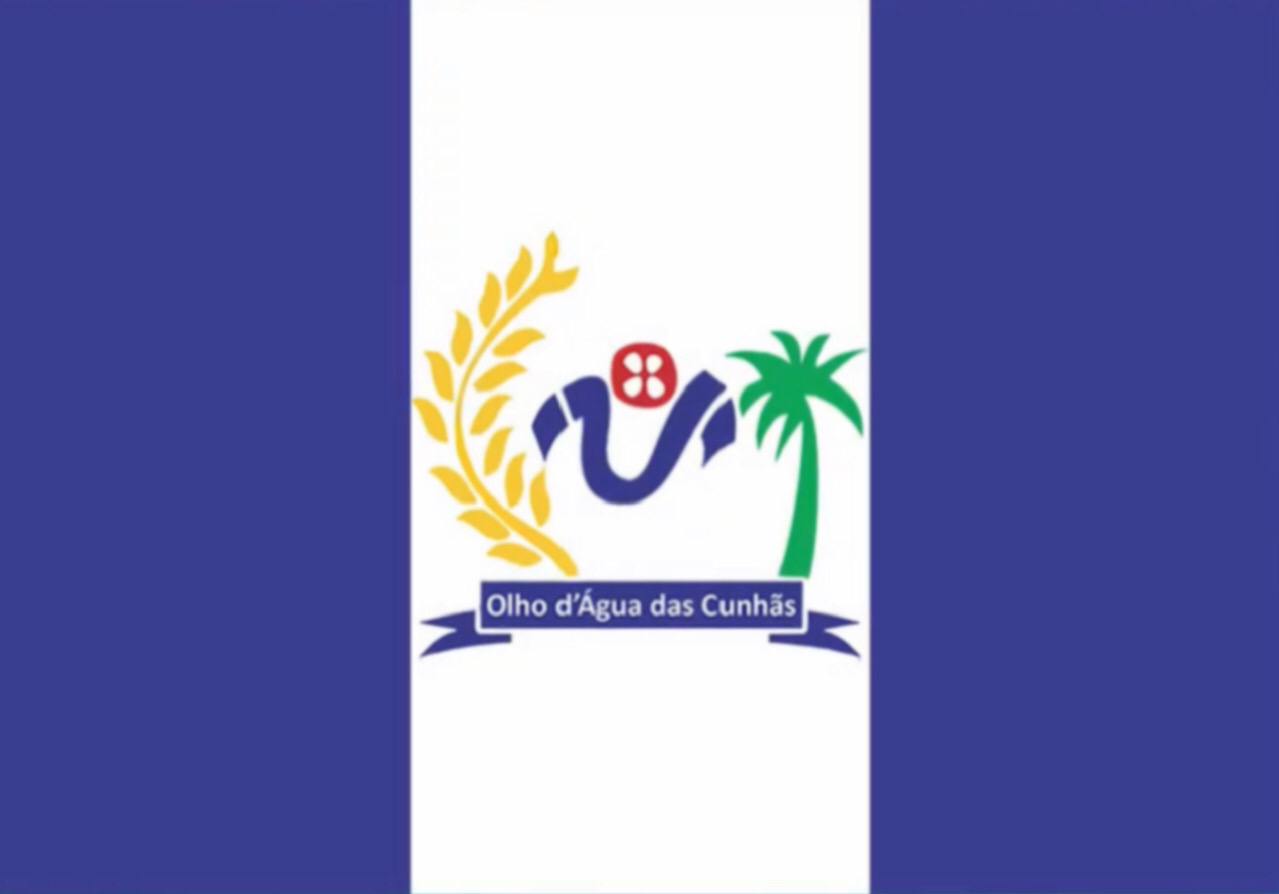
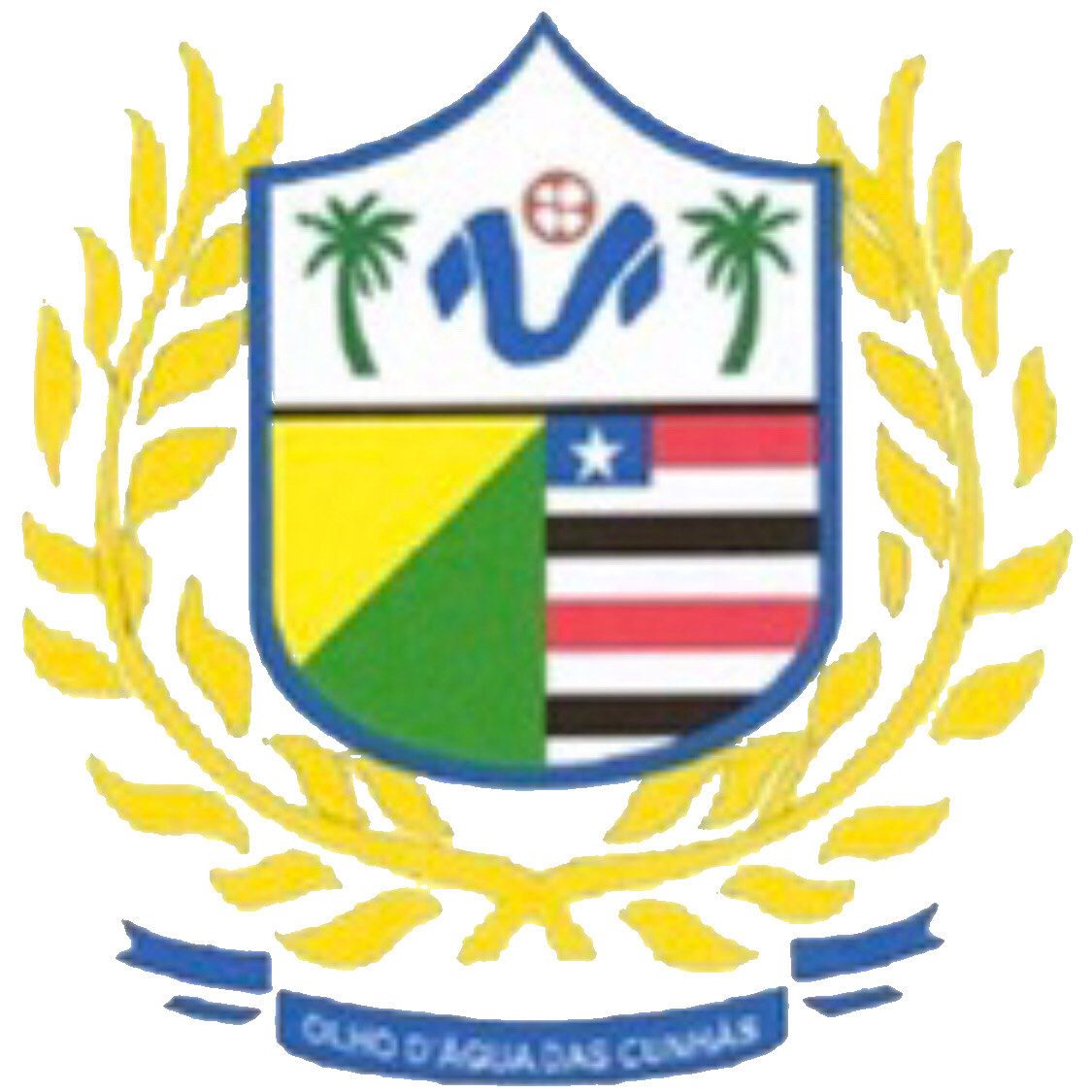
- Flag Coat of arms

- Location in Maranhão
- Coordinates: 04°08′20″S 45°07′12″W
- Country: Brazil
- Region: Nordeste
- State: Maranhão
- Mesoregion: Centro Maranhense
- Founded: 1961

Area
  - Total: 552.619 km^{2} (213.367 sq mi)
- Elevation: 30 m (98 ft)

Population (2020)
  - Total: 19,561
  - Density: 35.397/km^{2} (91.678/sq mi)
- Time zone: UTC−3 (BRT)

Olho d'Água das Cunhãs is a municipality in the state of Maranhão in the Northeast region of Brazil.

The municipality contains a small part of the Baixada Maranhense Environmental Protection Area, a 1,775,035.6-hectare (4,386,208-acre) sustainable use conservation unit created in 1991 that has been a Ramsar Site since 2000.

== See also ==
- List of municipalities in Maranhão
