= Iacanga =

- Municipality
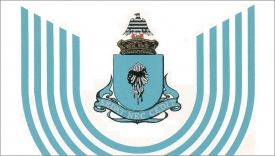
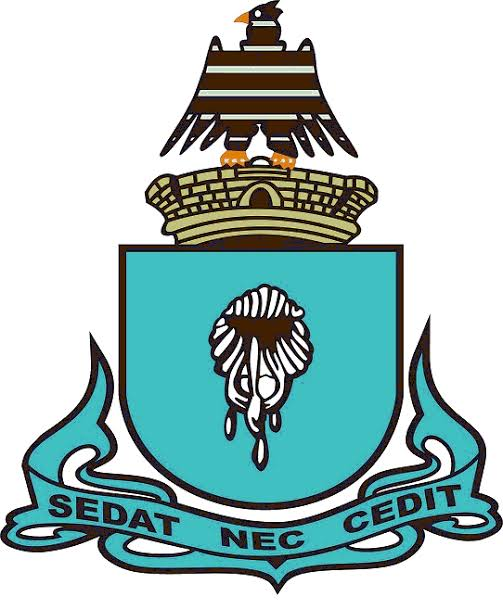
- Flag Coat of arms

- Location in São Paulo state

- Location in Brazil
- Coordinates: 21°53′24″S 49°1′29″W
- Country: Brazil
- Region: Southeast
- State: São Paulo

Area
  - Total: 547 km^{2} (211 sq mi)

Population (2020)
  - Total: 11,858
  - Density: 21.7/km^{2} (56.1/sq mi)
- Time zone: UTC−3 (BRT)

Iacanga is a municipality in the state of São Paulo in Brazil. The population is 11,858 (2020 est.) in an area of 547 km^{2}. Its altitude is 422 meters. Iacanga was the place of the first "Aguas Claras Festival", also announced as the "Brazilian Woodstock." Also known in the region, through the traditional Cowboy Festival, commemorating the anniversary of the city on 15 April.

== Media ==
In telecommunications, the city was served by Companhia de Telecomunicações do Estado de São Paulo until 1973, when it began to be served by Telecomunicações de São Paulo. In July 1998, this company was acquired by Telefónica, which adopted the Vivo brand in 2012.

The company is currently an operator of cell phones, fixed lines, internet (fiber optics/4G) and television (satellite and cable).

== See also ==
- List of municipalities in São Paulo
