= Turiaçu =

Coordinates: 1.66278°S 45.3719°W

- Municipality
- Flag Coat of arms

- Location in Maranhão
- Country: Brazil
- Region: Nordeste
- State: Maranhão
- Mesoregion: Oeste Maranhense

Population (2020)
  - Total: 35,709
- Time zone: UTC−3 (BRT)

Turiaçu is a municipality in the state of Maranhão in the Northeast region of Brazil.

The municipality contains a small part of the Baixada Maranhense Environmental Protection Area, a 1,775,035.6-hectare (4,386,208-acre) sustainable use conservation unit created in 1991 that has been a Ramsar Site since 2000.

== Climate ==
Turiaçu has a tropical savanna climate (Köppen Aw) bordering on a tropical monsoon climate (Am). The municipality is hot and very humid all year; however, there is a pronounced dry season from August to December with slightly lower humidity.

Climate data for Turiaçu (1991–2020)
Month	Jan	Feb	Mar	Apr	May	Jun	Jul	Aug	Sep	Oct	Nov	Dec	Year
Mean daily maximum °C (°F)	31.4 (88.5)	30.8 (87.4)	30.4 (86.7)	30.7 (87.3)	31.3 (88.3)	31.4 (88.5)	31.3 (88.3)	32.1 (89.8)	32.7 (90.9)	33.0 (91.4)	33.1 (91.6)	32.7 (90.9)	31.7 (89.1)
Daily mean °C (°F)	27.1 (80.8)	26.7 (80.1)	26.4 (79.5)	26.5 (79.7)	26.9 (80.4)	26.8 (80.2)	26.7 (80.1)	27.1 (80.8)	27.4 (81.3)	27.8 (82.0)	28.0 (82.4)	27.9 (82.2)	27.1 (80.8)
Mean daily minimum °C (°F)	23.7 (74.7)	23.4 (74.1)	23.2 (73.8)	23.1 (73.6)	23.4 (74.1)	23.2 (73.8)	23.1 (73.6)	23.6 (74.5)	23.9 (75.0)	24.1 (75.4)	24.3 (75.7)	24.3 (75.7)	23.6 (74.5)
Average precipitation mm (inches)	221.6 (8.72)	296.8 (11.69)	455.9 (17.95)	420.8 (16.57)	306.4 (12.06)	205.7 (8.10)	155.0 (6.10)	45.5 (1.79)	11.4 (0.45)	8.4 (0.33)	11.2 (0.44)	36.4 (1.43)	2,175.1 (85.63)
Average precipitation days (≥ 1.0 mm)	13.0	17.7	23.1	22.9	20.1	17.0	14.4	5.8	1.5	1.3	1.6	4.0	142.4
Average relative humidity (%)	83.2	86.4	88.4	89.0	87.6	85.8	85.0	81.4	77.9	76.7	77.0	78.4	83.1
Average dew point °C (°F)	24.2 (75.6)	24.4 (75.9)	24.5 (76.1)	24.7 (76.5)	24.8 (76.6)	24.5 (76.1)	24.3 (75.7)	24.1 (75.4)	23.8 (74.8)	23.8 (74.8)	24.0 (75.2)	24.1 (75.4)	24.3 (75.7)
Mean monthly sunshine hours	166.7	124.2	118.1	114.5	159.5	191.1	215.9	246.6	255.1	258.8	245.4	222.6	2,318.5
Source: NOAA

== See also ==
- List of municipalities in Maranhão
