= Planalto, Paraná =

Coordinates: 25°42′57″S 53°45′57″W

- Municipality
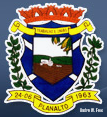
- Flag Coat of arms
- Interactive map of Planalto, Paraná
- Country: Brazil
- Region: Southern
- State: Paraná
- Mesoregion: Sudoeste Paranaense

Population (2020)
  - Total: 13,431
- Time zone: UTC−3 (BRT)

Planalto, Paraná is a municipality in the state of Paraná in the Southern Region of Brazil.

== Climate ==
Climate data for Planalto, elevation 400 m (1,300 ft), (1975–2015)
Month	Jan	Feb	Mar	Apr	May	Jun	Jul	Aug	Sep	Oct	Nov	Dec	Year
Record high °C (°F)	37.4 (99.3)	37.8 (100.0)	38.2 (100.8)	35.6 (96.1)	32.4 (90.3)	30.0 (86.0)	31.8 (89.2)	35.8 (96.4)	37.8 (100.0)	38.2 (100.8)	39.2 (102.6)	39.8 (103.6)	39.8 (103.6)
Mean daily maximum °C (°F)	31.1 (88.0)	30.7 (87.3)	30.3 (86.5)	27.5 (81.5)	23.7 (74.7)	22.1 (71.8)	22.4 (72.3)	24.9 (76.8)	25.9 (78.6)	28.2 (82.8)	29.6 (85.3)	30.6 (87.1)	27.3 (81.1)
Daily mean °C (°F)	25.2 (77.4)	24.7 (76.5)	24.1 (75.4)	21.5 (70.7)	18.1 (64.6)	16.7 (62.1)	16.6 (61.9)	18.6 (65.5)	19.6 (67.3)	22.2 (72.0)	23.6 (74.5)	24.8 (76.6)	21.3 (70.4)
Mean daily minimum °C (°F)	20.6 (69.1)	20.3 (68.5)	19.5 (67.1)	17.1 (62.8)	13.9 (57.0)	12.8 (55.0)	12.4 (54.3)	13.8 (56.8)	14.9 (58.8)	17.3 (63.1)	18.5 (65.3)	20.0 (68.0)	16.8 (62.2)
Record low °C (°F)	20.6 (69.1)	20.3 (68.5)	19.5 (67.1)	17.1 (62.8)	13.9 (57.0)	12.8 (55.0)	12.4 (54.3)	13.8 (56.8)	14.9 (58.8)	17.3 (63.1)	18.5 (65.3)	20.0 (68.0)	12.4 (54.3)
Average precipitation mm (inches)	180.2 (7.09)	165.0 (6.50)	128.8 (5.07)	166.0 (6.54)	180.9 (7.12)	161.6 (6.36)	120.1 (4.73)	107.4 (4.23)	159.2 (6.27)	233.9 (9.21)	169.1 (6.66)	180.7 (7.11)	1,952.9 (76.89)
Average precipitation days (≥ 1.0 mm)	13	12	10	9	10	10	9	8	10	12	10	11	124
Average relative humidity (%)	71	74	71	72	74	75	70	64	65	67	66	68	70
Mean monthly sunshine hours	243.6	211.0	233.2	209.8	192.3	168.9	192.1	208.3	189.8	214.0	231.4	246.0	2,540.4
Source: IDR-Paraná

== See also ==
- List of municipalities in Paraná
