= Ana Maria Braga =

Brazilian television presenter and journalist

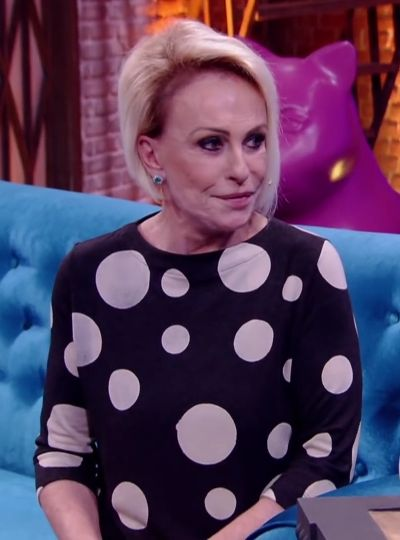
- Braga in 2019
- Born: Ana Maria Braga Maffeis; 1 April 1949 (age 77); São Joaquim da Barra, São Paulo, Brazil
- Citizenship: Brazil; Italy
- Education: São Paulo State University
- Occupations: Television presenter; journalist
- Years active: 1961–present
- Notable work: Mais Você
- Spouses: Antonio Drausio Badan (m. 1971, divorced) Eduardo de Carvalho (m. 1980; div. 1992) Carlos Madrulha (m. 1997; div. 2002) Johnny Lucet (m. 2020; div. 2021) Fábio Arruda (m. 2025)
- Children: 2
- Website: anamariabraga.com.br

Ana Maria Braga Maffeis (born 1 April 1949) is a Brazilian television presenter and journalist. She is best known for hosting the long-running variety program Mais Você on Rede Globo, which she has presented since 1999. Before joining Globo, she gained national recognition at Rede Record, where she presented the morning show Note e Anote and the talk show Programa Ana Maria Braga. Born in São Joaquim da Barra, São Paulo, she graduated from São Paulo State University with degrees in biology and zoology. She also holds Italian citizenship through her father. In addition to her television work, she has appeared in several Brazilian films and telenovelas and has authored a number of books.

== Early life and education ==
Braga was born on April 1, 1949, the daughter of the Italian Natale Giuseppe Maffeis and the Brazilian Lourdes Braga. She graduated with degrees in biology and zoology at the São Paulo State University in São José do Rio Preto. She also holds Italian citizenship through her father.

== Career ==
Braga started her career in journalism working on the news program Jornal de Verdade on TV Rio Preto, later moving to Rede Tupi de Notícias at Rede Tupi. She later worked at Editora Abril as a commercial director for fashion magazines such as Cláudia. She attained national recognition at Rede Record, where she presented the morning show Note e Anote and the talk show Programa Ana Maria Braga.

Since 1999, she has presented the variety program Mais Você at Rede Globo, which was co-hosted with a parrot puppet named Louro José until the death of his puppeteer Tom Veiga on November 1, 2020.

== Personal life ==
In 2020, she married the French businessman Johnny Lucet in her own home of São Paulo.

== Filmography ==
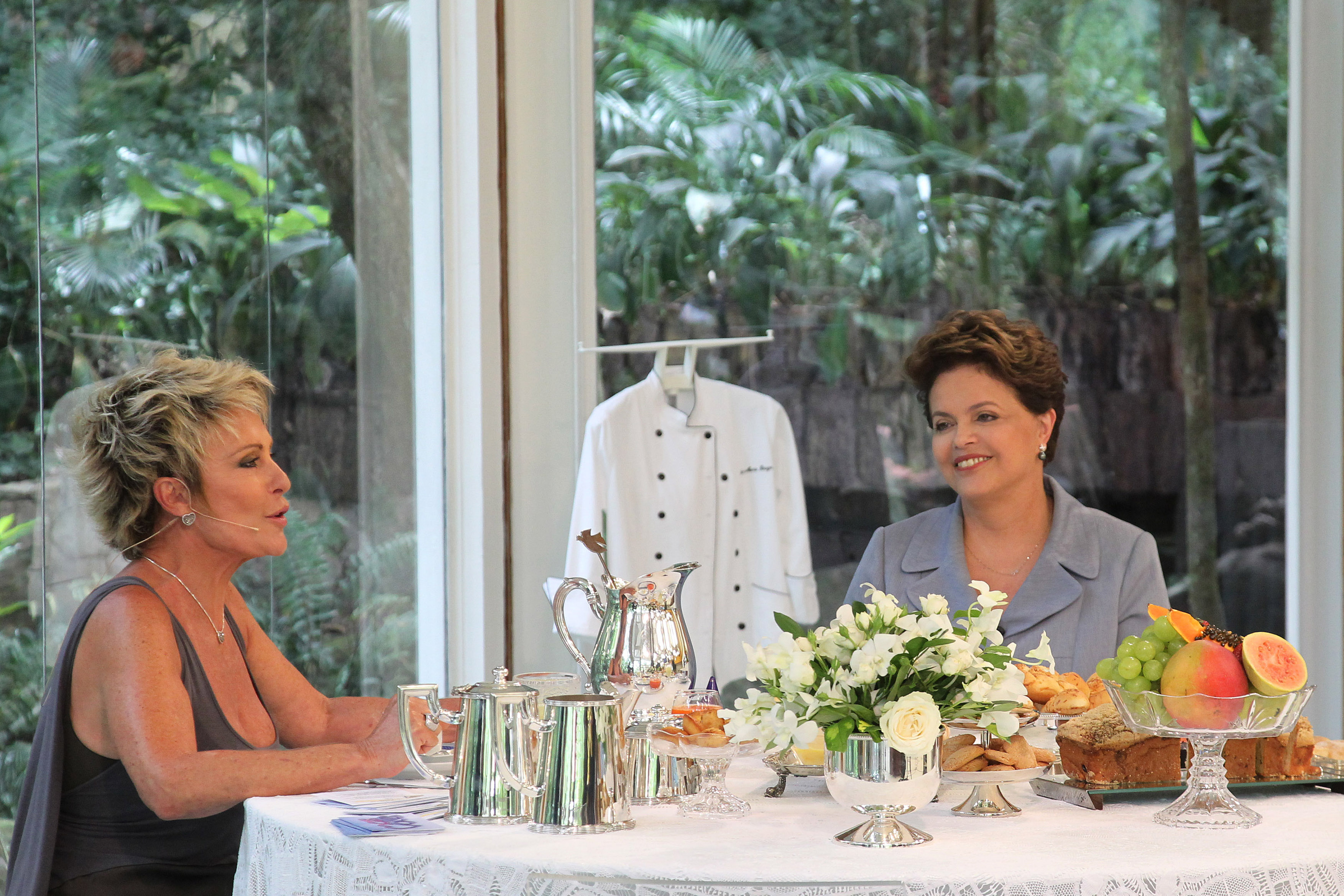
Braga interviews president Dilma Rousseff on the program Mais Você in 2011.

=== Television ===
Presenter

- 1977-1980 Rede Tupi de Notícias (Rede Tupi)
- 1993-1999 Note e Anote (Rede Record)
- 1996-1999 Programa Ana Maria Braga (Rede Record)
- 1999-current Mais Você (Rede Globo)
- 2025-present Chef de Alto Nível (Rede Globo)

Special participations

- 2000 - Você Decide - (Ep: "Olha o Passarinho")
- 2002 - O Clone - herself
- 2002 - A Grande Família -herself (Ep: "A quentinha de Bebel")
- 2002 - Sítio do Picapau Amarelo -herself (Eps: "A pedra mágica de Tupã" e "O Sumiço da Emília")
- 2004 - A Diarista -herself(Ep: "Aquele do Projac")
- 2004 - Sob Nova Direção - herself (Ep: "Axé do Dengo)
- 2008 - Beleza Pura -herself (tho chapters)
- 2010 - Junto e Misturado -herself (Ep: "celebridades bloco 2")
- 2010 - Passione - herself
- 2011 - Malhação Conectados - herself
- 2012 - Louco por Elas - herself
- 2012 - Cheias de Charme - herself (two chapters)
- 2013 - Sangue Bom - herself
- 2014 - Alto Astral - herself

=== Cinema ===
- 2001 - Xuxa e os Duendes - Zinga
- 2002 - Xuxa e os Duendes 2 - No Caminho das Fadas - Zinga
- 2013 - As Aventuras de Crô - herself

== Recordings ==
Solo

- 2003: Sou Eu

Special guest

- 2005: "Na Trilha do Amor" on Fábio Júnior's Mais de 20 e Poucos Anos

== Books ==
- 2009: Mais Você 10 Anos
- 2010: À Espera dos Filhos da Luz - fiction
- 2011: Dicas de Quase Tudo
- 2011: Chef em Casa
- 2011: Mais Você: Viagens e Receitas Internacionais
- 2012: A Cozinha Rápida
