= Alex Atala =

Brazilian chef

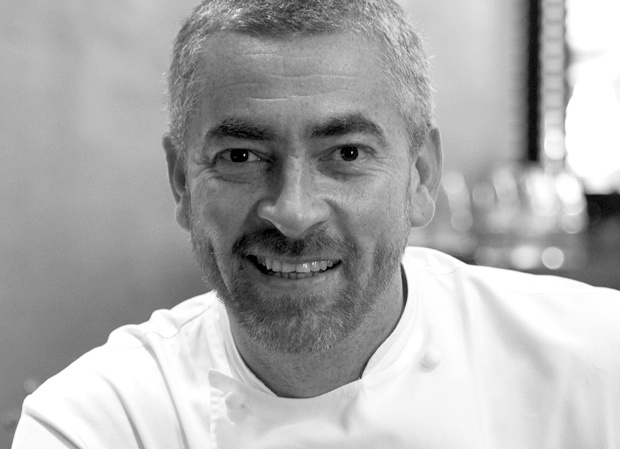
- Born: Milad Alexandre Mack Atala; 3 June 1968 (age 58); São Bernardo do Campo, São Paulo, Brazil
- Occupations: Chef, restaurateur
- Known for: Chef of D.O.M.

Milad Alexandre Mack Atala (born June 3, 1968) is a Brazilian chef of Palestinian and Irish ancestry, who runs the restaurant D.O.M. (Latin abbreviation of Deo optimo maximo) in São Paulo. In May 2012, D.O.M. was rated the 4th best restaurant in the world by the S.Pellegrino World's 50 Best Restaurants, published by Restaurant magazine. His establishment also holds the title of "Acqua Panna Best Restaurant in South America". He is known for transforming traditional Brazilian dishes, adapting French and Italian culinary techniques to native Brazilian ingredients, and for championing the use of native Brazilian produce such as açaí, cassava, and Amazonian herbs in fine dining. Atala also hosted a television show on Brazilian TV channel GNT. In 2013, he founded Atá, an institute about the relationship with food, with Roberto Smeraldi and Carlos Alberto Ricardo, among others. In 2019, Atala and his institute were accused of misappropriating the name "Cerrado vanilla" by registering it as a commercial name at the Brazilian Institute for Industrial Property (INPI), without prior consultation to rural communities who traditionally use the ingredient in their food cultures.

== Books ==
- Por uma Gastronomia Brasileira - Alex Atala - Editora Bei, 2003 - ISBN 85-86518-35-2
- Com Unhas, Dentes & Cuca - Alex Atala - Editora Senac, 2008
- Escoffianas Brasileiras - Alex Atala - Editora Larousse Brasil, 2008 - ISBN 978-85-7635-254-9

== Television ==
Alex Atala has appeared in Chef's Table Season 2, Episode 2.
