= Celebrity Race Across the World series 2 =

Second series of Celebrity Race Across the World

Celebrity Race Across the World
- Series 2
- Presented by: John Hannah (narrator)
- No. of days: 30
- No. of contestants: 8
- Winners: Scott Mills and Sam Vaughan
- No. of legs: 6
- Distance traveled: 12,500 km (7,800 mi)
- No. of episodes: 6

Release
- Original network: BBC One
- Original release: 14 August – 18 September 2024

Season chronology
- ← Previous; Series 1 Next → Series 3

The second series of Celebrity Race Across the World was a race over 12,500 kilometres (7,800 mi) across South America, starting in Belém, Brazil and finishing in Frutillar, Chile.

It was announced by the BBC on 30 July 2024 and began airing on 14 August 2024 in the 9pm time slot on BBC One.

In the same press release the BBC confirmed that the series would once again consist of 6 hour-long episodes and revealed the four pairs of competitors as broadcaster Jeff Brazier and his son, Freddy; actor Kola Bokinni and his cousin, Mary Ellen; former model Kelly Brook and her husband, Jeremy; and BBC Radio 2 presenter Scott Mills and his then-fiancé (now husband) Sam.

Start and end points
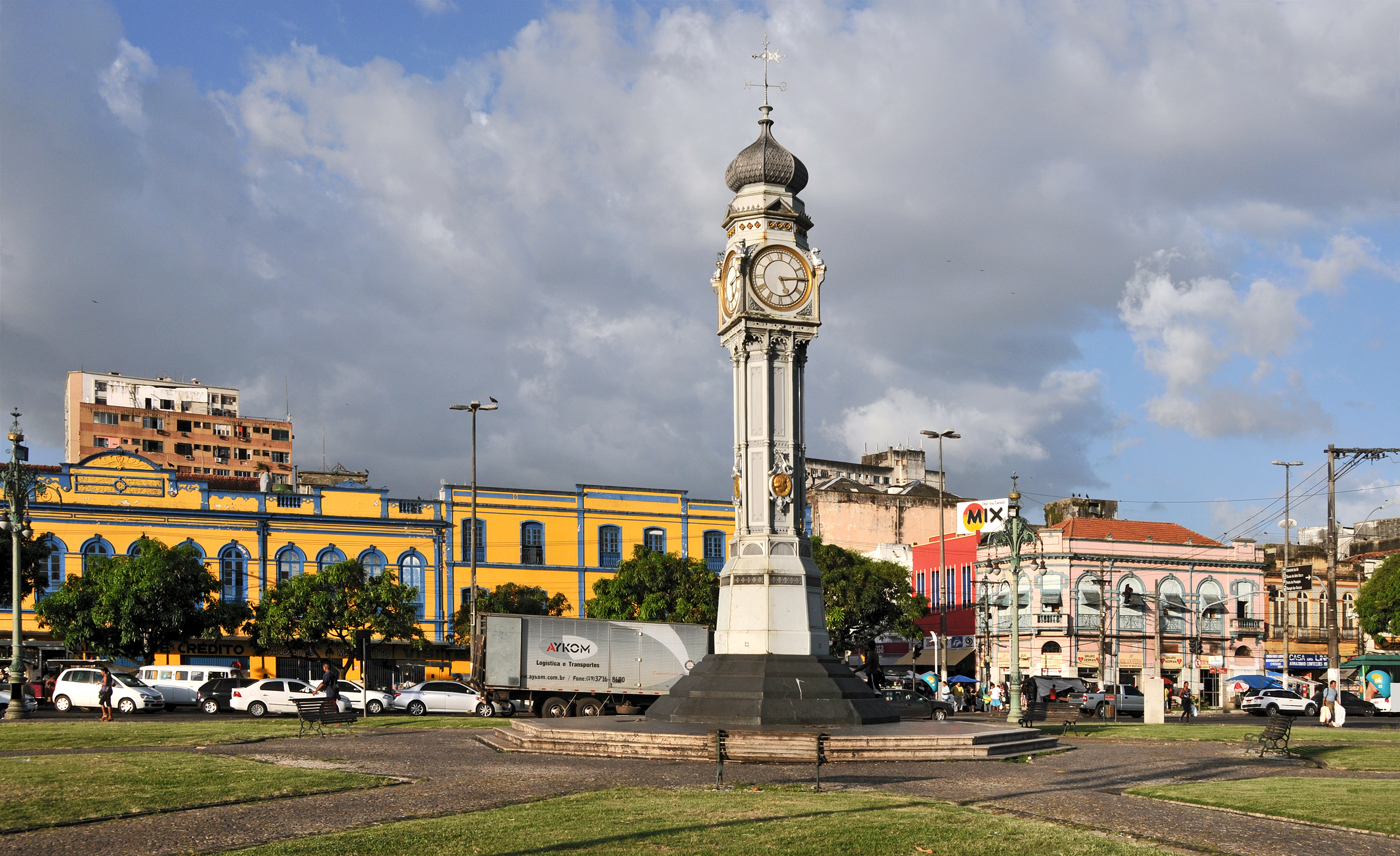
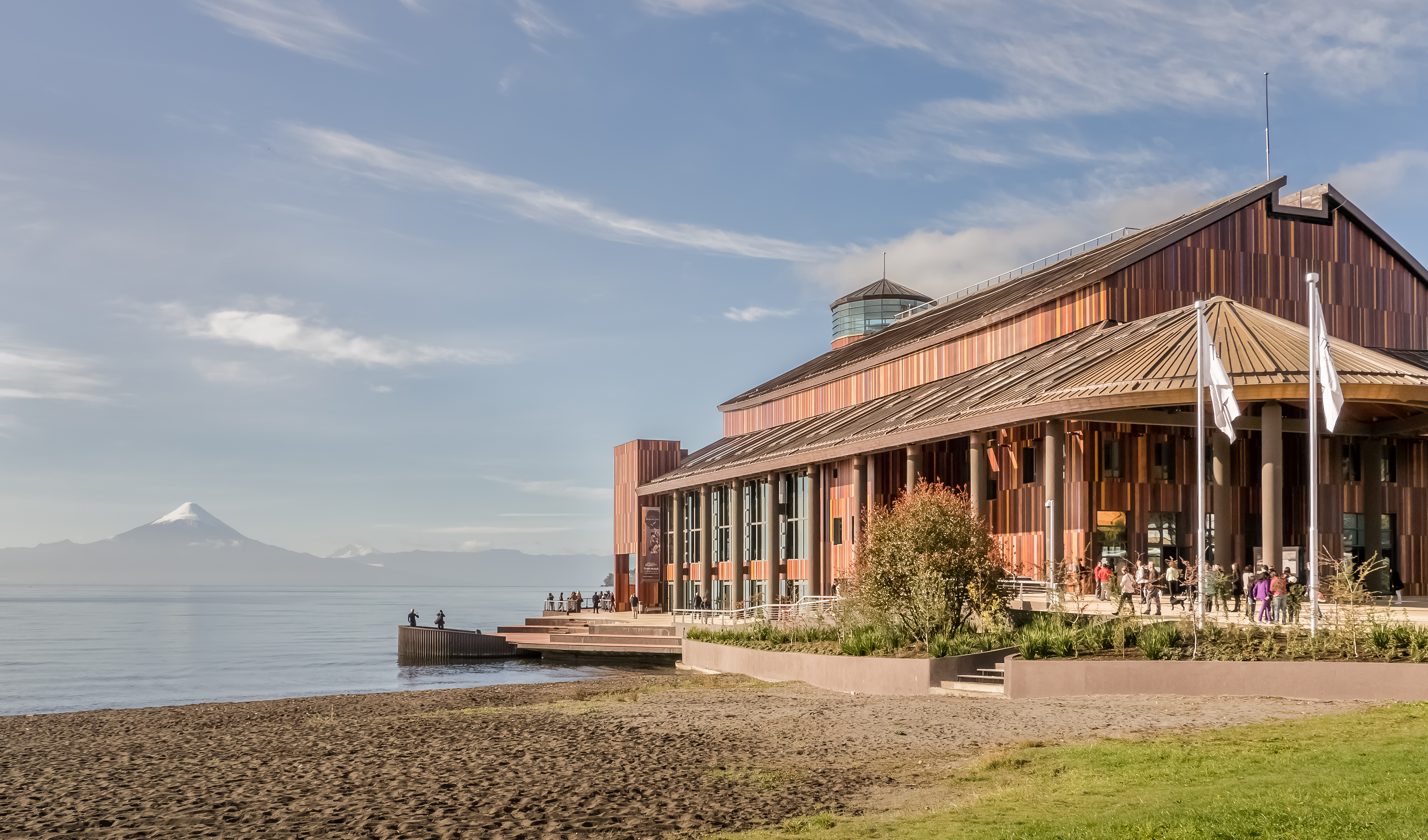
Siqueira Campos Square, Belém, Brazil (top) and Frutillar, Chile with Volcán Osorno in the distance (bottom)

== Overview ==
The race had five checkpoints with enforced rest periods, with contestants only finding out the next destination on departure from a checkpoint. Teams were given a budget of £1100 per person – equivalent to the air fare for travelling the race route. Contestants were not permitted to subsidise their budgets, but short-term opportunities allowed them to work for money or bed and board. The contestants were not allowed access to telephones or the internet, but were provided with a map, travel guide and GPS tracker.

== Contestants ==
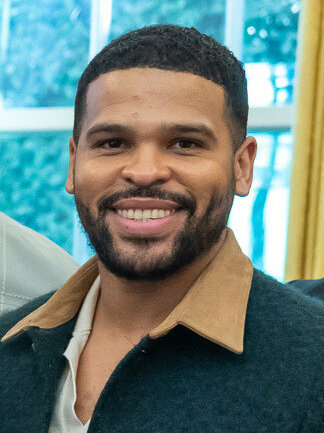
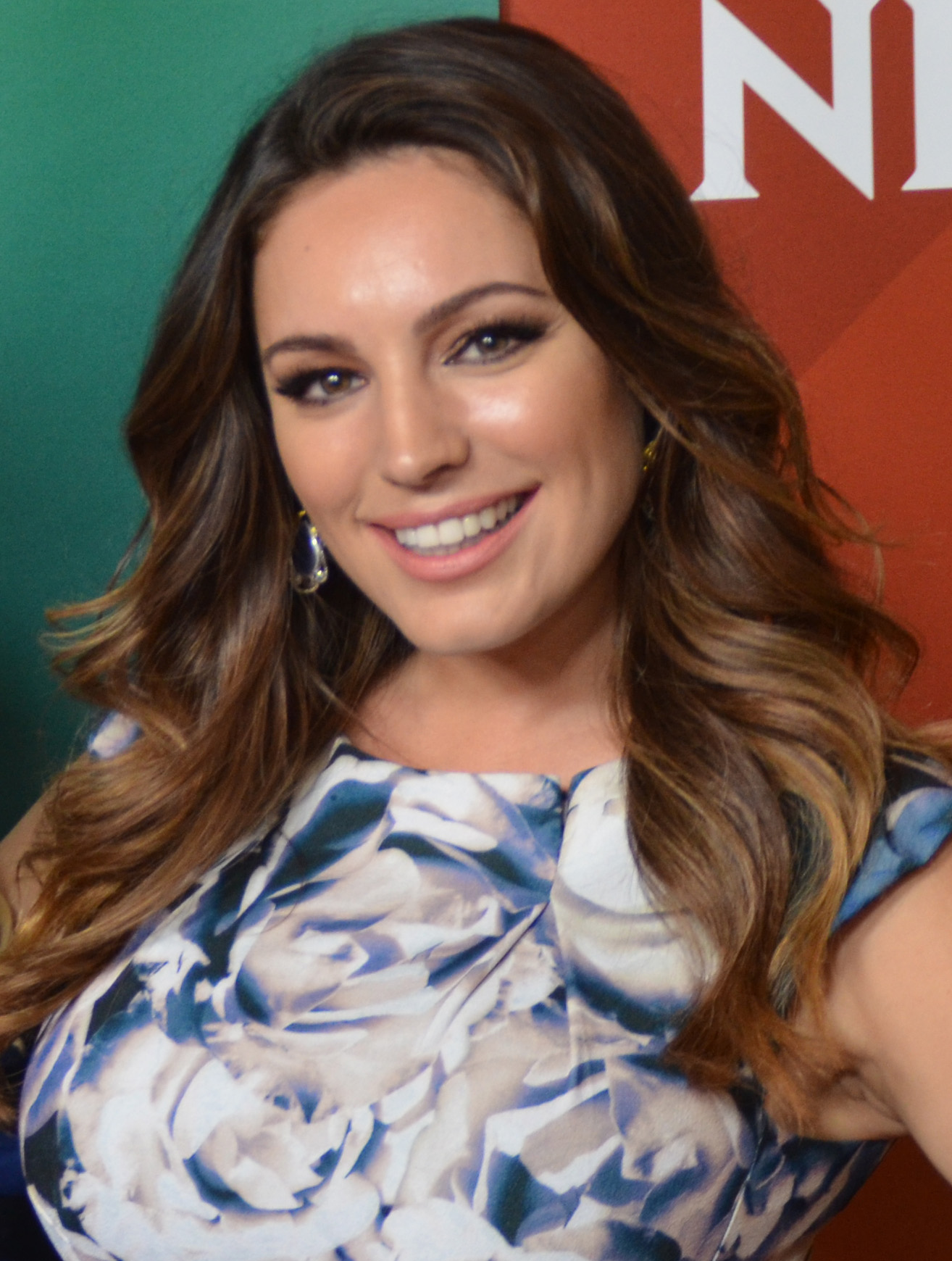
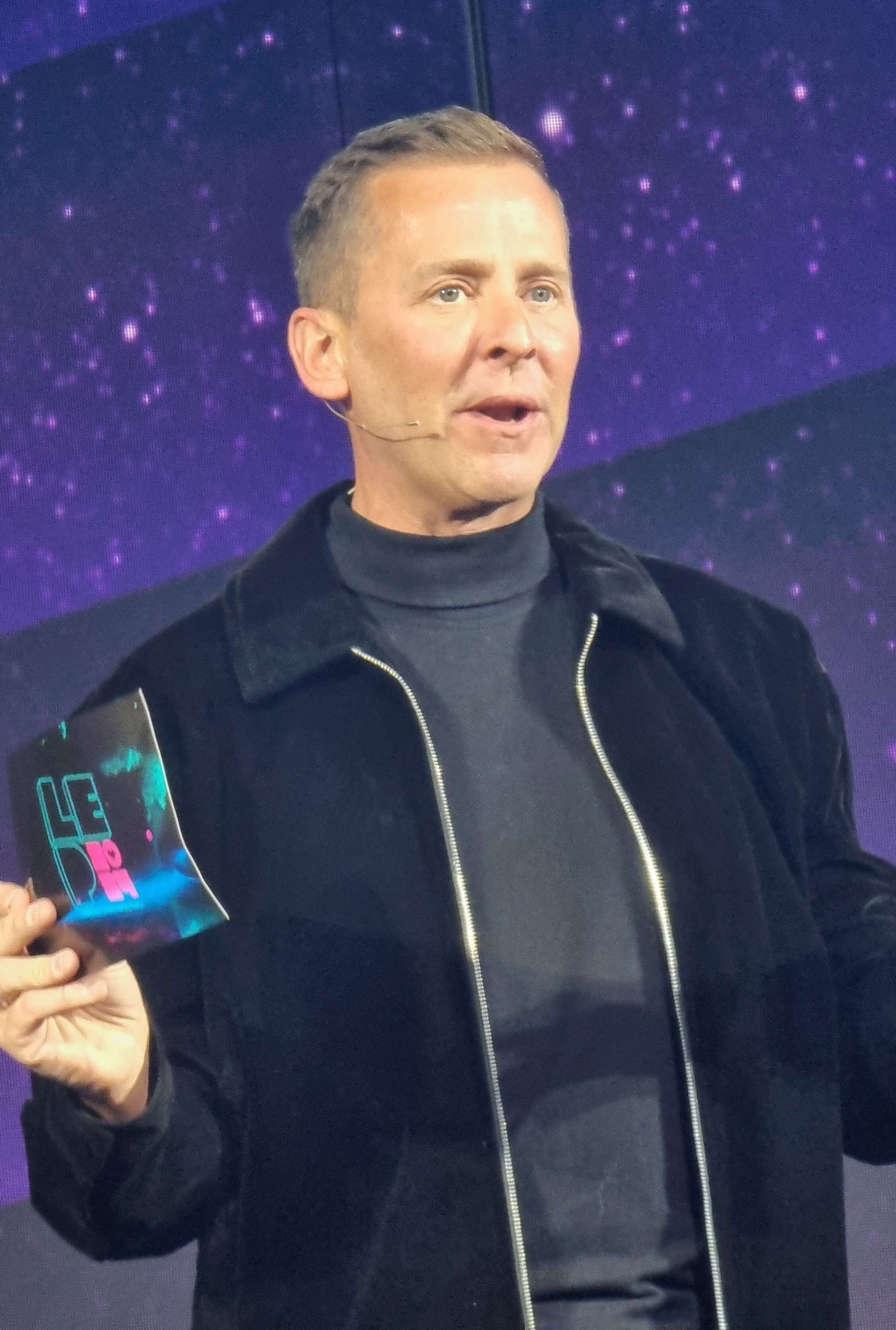
From left to right: Kola Bokinni, Kelly Brook and Scott Mills

Name	Relationship	Occupation	Age	Ref.
Kelly Brook	Wife and Husband	Broadcaster	44	
Jeremy Parisi	Wife and Husband	Judo champion	39	
Scott Mills	Husband and Husband	BBC Radio 2 host	51	
Sam Vaughan	Husband and Husband	Events producer	35	
Jeff Brazier	Father and Son	Broadcaster	45	
Freddy Brazier	Father and Son	Part time worker	19	
Kola Bokinni	Cousins	Actor	32	
Mary Ellen Moriarty	Cousins	Student	29	

== Results summary ==
Colour key:

– Team withdrawn
– Series winners

Teams	Position (by leg)					
Teams	1	2	3	4	5	6
Scott & Sam	2nd	4th	3rd	1st	3rd	Winners
Kola & Mary Ellen	4th	2nd	4th	3rd	1st	2nd
Jeff & Freddy	3rd	1st	1st	4th	2nd	3rd
Kelly & Jeremy	1st	3rd	2nd	2nd	4th	4th

== Route ==
The checkpoints in the second celebrity series were:

Leg	From	To
1	Siqueira Campos Square, Belém, Pará, Brazil	Hotel Long Beach, Canoa Quebrada, Ceará, Brazil
2	Hotel Long Beach, Canoa Quebrada, Ceará, Brazil	Hotel Canto das Águas, Lençóis, Bahia, Brazil
3	Hotel Canto das Águas, Lençóis, Bahia, Brazil	Hotel Unique, São Paulo, São Paulo, Brazil
4	Hotel Unique, São Paulo, São Paulo, Brazil	Delta Eco Hotel, Tigre, Buenos Aires, Argentina
5	Delta Eco Hotel, Tigre, Buenos Aires, Argentina	Las Marias Hotel, Tilcara, Argentina
6	Las Marias Hotel, Tilcara, Argentina	Volcán Osorno, Frutillar, Chile

Checkpoints on Celebrity Series 2: Checkpoint, Start, Finish

== Race summary ==
Mode of transportation	Rail Ship Bus/coach Taxi Road vehicle Self-drive vehicle (paid) RV
Activity	Working for money and/or bed and board Excursion that cost time and/or money

=== Leg 1: Belém, Pará, Brazil → Canoa Quebrada, Ceará, Brazil ===
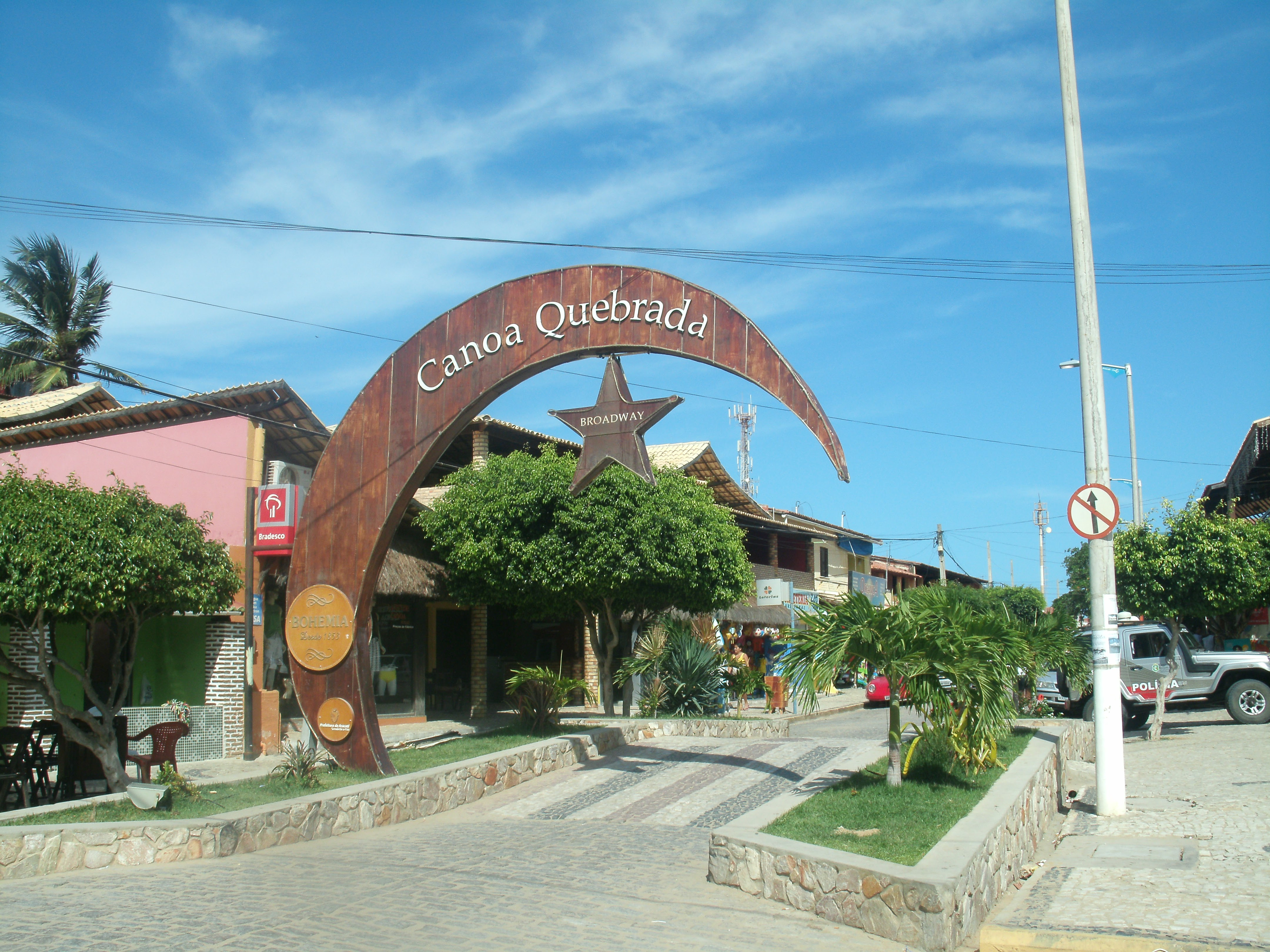
Canoa Quebrada, Ceará, Brazil

The four teams, having checked in at the Farol de Belém lighthouse to hand over their wallets and mobile phones and to collect their race essentials, began the race in earnest at 2pm underneath the clock tower in Siqueira Campos Square. It was revealed that the first checkpoint was 1,750 kilometres (1,090 mi) away in the beach resort of Canoa Quebrada on the Ceará coast.

Two teams opted for an inland route whilst the other two opted for the more touristic and costly coastal route, but ultimately all four teams would pass through Fortaleza, the largest city closest to the checkpoint in Canoa Quebrada.

The two inland teams headed straight for work opportunities with the promise of free bed and board. Scott & Sam helped make Goiabada at a confectioners in Carolina in the Cerrado whilst Jeff & Freddy helped out on a Chacaras (farm) in São Raimundo.

Of the two coastal teams, Kelly & Jeremy headed to nearby Bragança to assist with planting mangrove seedlings in the Caete-Taperacu Reserve in exchange for free bed and board, whilst Kola & Mary Ellen headed initially to the state capital of Sao Luis and then immediately onto Santa Amaro. Having been delayed for a day due to poor transport links, Kelly & Jeremy reassessed their strategy and decided to divert inland to Teresina, a destination that Jeff & Freddy and Scott & Sam were also headed towards.

Kola & Mary Ellen did some dune bashing at Lençóis Maranhenses National Park, but found themselves stranded without any options of public transport forward. Desperate not to backtrack to Sao Luis, they splashed out on a costly taxi.

In Teresina, all three teams pressed forward to Fortaleza. Jeff & Freddy and Scott & Sam found themselves on the same 10-hour bus journey. At the bus terminus in Fortaleza, Scott & Sam immediately took a taxi whilst Jeff & Freddy tried to hitch a lift, a decision which would cost the latter team an hour and a race position.

Kelly & Jeremy arrived first at the checkpoint in the dying minutes of day 4, followed by Scott & Sam a little over an hour later. Jeff & Freddy finished third, a further hour after Scott & Sam.

Order	Teams	Route	Hours behind leaders	Money left
1	Kelly & Jeremy	Belém → Bragança → Teresina → Fortaleza → Canoa Quebrada	—N/a	84%
2	Scott & Sam	Belém → Imperatiz → Carolina → Teresina → Fortaleza → Canoa Quebrada	1 hour 5 minutes	85%
3	Jeff & Freddy	Belém → Porto Franco → São Raimundo → Porto Franco → Teresina → Fortaleza → Canoa Quebrada	2 hours 11 minutes	88%
4	Kola & Mary Ellen	Belém → Sao Luis → Santa Amaro → Parnaiba → Fortaleza → Canoa Quebrada	12 hours 30 minutes	79%

=== Leg 2: Canoa Quebrada, Ceará, Brazil → Lençóis, Bahia, Brazil ===
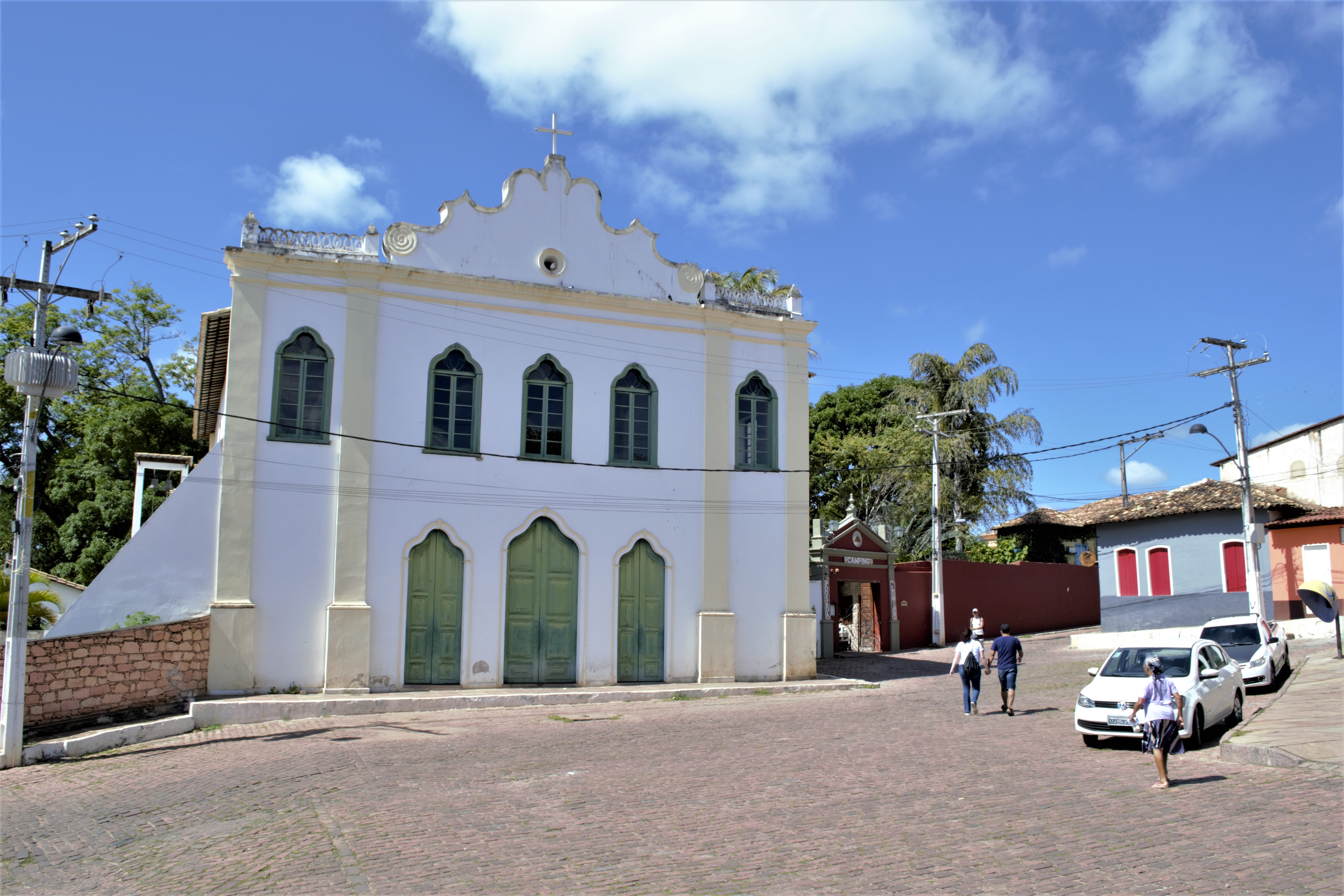
Lençóis, Bahia, Brazil

The race restarted on day 6 and the finish point of the second leg was revealed to be Lençóis, gateway to the Chapada Diamantina National Park, in the Brazilian state of Bahia, some 1,550 kilometres (960 mi) away.

Once again, the teams faced the dilemma of selecting either a well-connected, but relatively expensive route traversing the coastal cities or a cheaper, rural one through the more sparsely populated interior, with the inland route entailing backtracking to Fortaleza first.

A complete lack of foreign exchange bureaux in Aracati forced Kelly & Jeremy to wait seven hours for a bus they could afford with their remaining Brazilian Reals. This unanticipated turn of events allowed Scott & Sam to catch up to the leading pair, but they also found themselves without enough local currency to pay for bus tickets. Some helpful Mormon missionaries facilitated an impromptu exchange and so Scott & Sam managed to secure seats for themselves on the same midnight service to Natal as the leading team.

Jeff & Freddy, the only team to opt to make their way through the interior, headed first to Quixadá where they worked alongside Alpacas at a glamping site in the Caatinga, after which they left for Juazeiro do Norte on an overnight bus. There, they visited the monumental statue of the city's patron saint, Padre Cícero Romão Batista, before pressing onward to Brejo Santo where they caught a bus to Seabra, within striking distance of the checkpoint in Lençóis.

Having arrived in Natal, Scott & Sam and Kelly & Jeremy went their separate ways to their own work opportunities. The former pair headed to Pipa Beach where they were mistaken for father and son. The latter duo, having lost another four hours searching for a place to change currency in Natal, eventually proceeded to João Pessoa and then back up the coast on an unpaved road to a hostel in Barra do Mamanguape.

Last to leave Canoa Quebrada on day 7, Kola & Mary Ellen headed straight to Recife on a 12-hour bus journey. On arrival they took a side trip to nearby Olinda to see the sights. That evening they bumped into Scott & Sam who were just arriving at Recife coach station as they were departing towards Petrolândia in the interior where they had arranged to top up funds working in a local restaurant.

The next day Scott & Sam caught a nightbus to Feira de Santana. Meanwhile, Kelly & Jeremy had journeyed down the Brazilian coast to Maceió, leapfrogging their rivals, and were also heading to Feira de Santana.

When Kola & Mary Ellen found out the bus from Petrolândia to Lençóis was sold out, they caught a lucky break when they were offered a taxi at the same price as the cost of the bus tickets.

On day 9, Jeff & Freddy were the first team to arrive in the colonial mining town of Lençóis. They were first directed to the Church of Igreja do Rosario and then onto the checkpoint at the Hotel Canto das Águas. It would be another day before Kola & Mary Ellen and Kelly & Jeremy reached the checkpoint in second and third place respectively.

Order	Teams	Route	Hours behind leaders	Money left
1	Jeff & Freddy	Canoa Quebrada → Fortaleza → Quixadá → Juazeiro do Norte → Brejo Santo → Seabra → Lençóis	—N/a	79%
2	Kola & Mary Ellen	Canoa Quebrada → Aracati → Recife → Olinda → Recife → Petrolândia → Lençóis	15 hours 20 minutes	66%
3	Kelly & Jeremy	Canoa Quebrada → Aracati → Natal → João Pessoa → Barra do Mamanguape → João Pessoa → Maceió → Feira de Santana → Lençóis	20 hours 29 minutes	66%
4	Scott & Sam	Canoa Quebrada → Aracati → Natal → Pipa Beach → Recife → Feira de Santana → Lençóis	27 hours	69%

=== Leg 3: Lençóis, Bahia, Brazil → São Paulo, São Paulo, Brazil ===
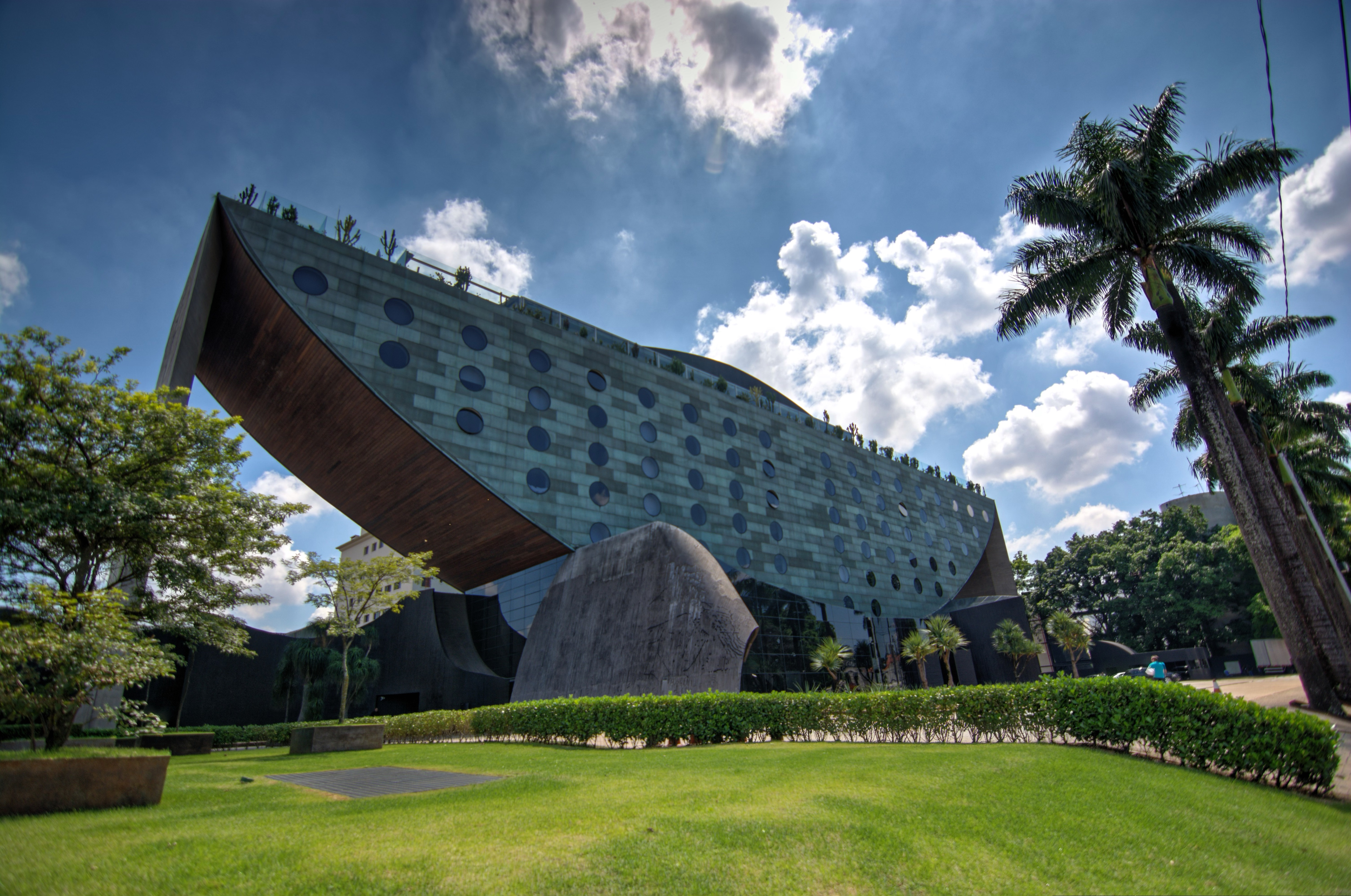
Hotel Unique, São Paulo, São Paulo, Brazil

The race recommenced on day 11 with a leg that started from tranquil Lençóis but finished in the bustling megalopolis of São Paulo, 2,400 kilometres (1,500 mi) away to the south west.

Leaving in the morning, Jeff & Freddy decided to head to the coast and the city of Salvador. There they celebrated the life of Freddy's mother, Jade Goody, by viewing the sunset at the Barra lighthouse and taking a dip in the Bay of All Saints.

Kola & Mary Ellen left the checkpoint in the late evening, but with no overnight buses found themselves stranded for another night in Lençóis until the next day when they chose to head to Porto Seguro to work as a waiter and an Axé dancer respectively, at a famous beach bar.

That same day, Kelly & Jeremy also departed checkpoint two but chose to travel via Seabra to the capital Brasília, where they arrived on day 13. Whilst in the city they visited the Oscar Niemeyer designed Metropolitan cathedral before trying their hand at shoe shining at the intercity bus terminal.

Last to depart, Scott & Sam took a chance and requisitioned a taxi to Itaberaba, 140 kilometres (87 mi) away, for an opportunity to top up their funds, but having underestimated the journey time, arrived too late both for work and any onward travel. Determined to turn their fortunes around they managed to secure a job that evening in the kitchen of a pizzeria.

Having made it to Rio de Janeiro via Vitoria, Freddy took the opportunity to sell Mate cocido on Copacabana beach to replenish funds he had spent on souvenirs. Also continuing to top up funds were Scott & Sam (serving drinks in a bar in Goiânia) and Kola & Mary Ellen (working in a coffee shop in Belo Horizonte).

Having made it as far as Uberlândia, Kelly & Jeremy pressed onward to São Paulo desperate to move up the leaderboard. When the teams arrived in the city they were instructed to take the Metro to the São Paulo Museum of Art (MASP) in the Jardins district and then given directions to the checkpoint at the Hotel Unique. Jeff & Freddy arrived first, followed by Kelly & Jeremy almost 9 hours later. Scott & Sam arrived third, a further 6 hours later followed eventually by Kola & Mary Ellen just over an hour after them.

Order	Teams	Route	Hours behind leaders	Money left
1	Jeff & Freddy	Lençóis → Salvador → Vitoria → Rio de Janeiro → São Paulo	—N/a	56%
2	Kelly & Jeremy	Lençóis → Seabra → Brasília → Uberlândia → São Paulo	8 hours 55 minutes	51%
3	Scott & Sam	Lençóis → Itaberaba → Goiânia → São Paulo	14 hours 45 minutes	49%
4	Kola & Mary Ellen	Lençóis → Porto Seguro → Belo Horizonte → São Paulo	16 hours 6 minutes	45%

=== Leg 4: São Paulo, São Paulo, Brazil → Tigre, Buenos Aires, Argentina ===
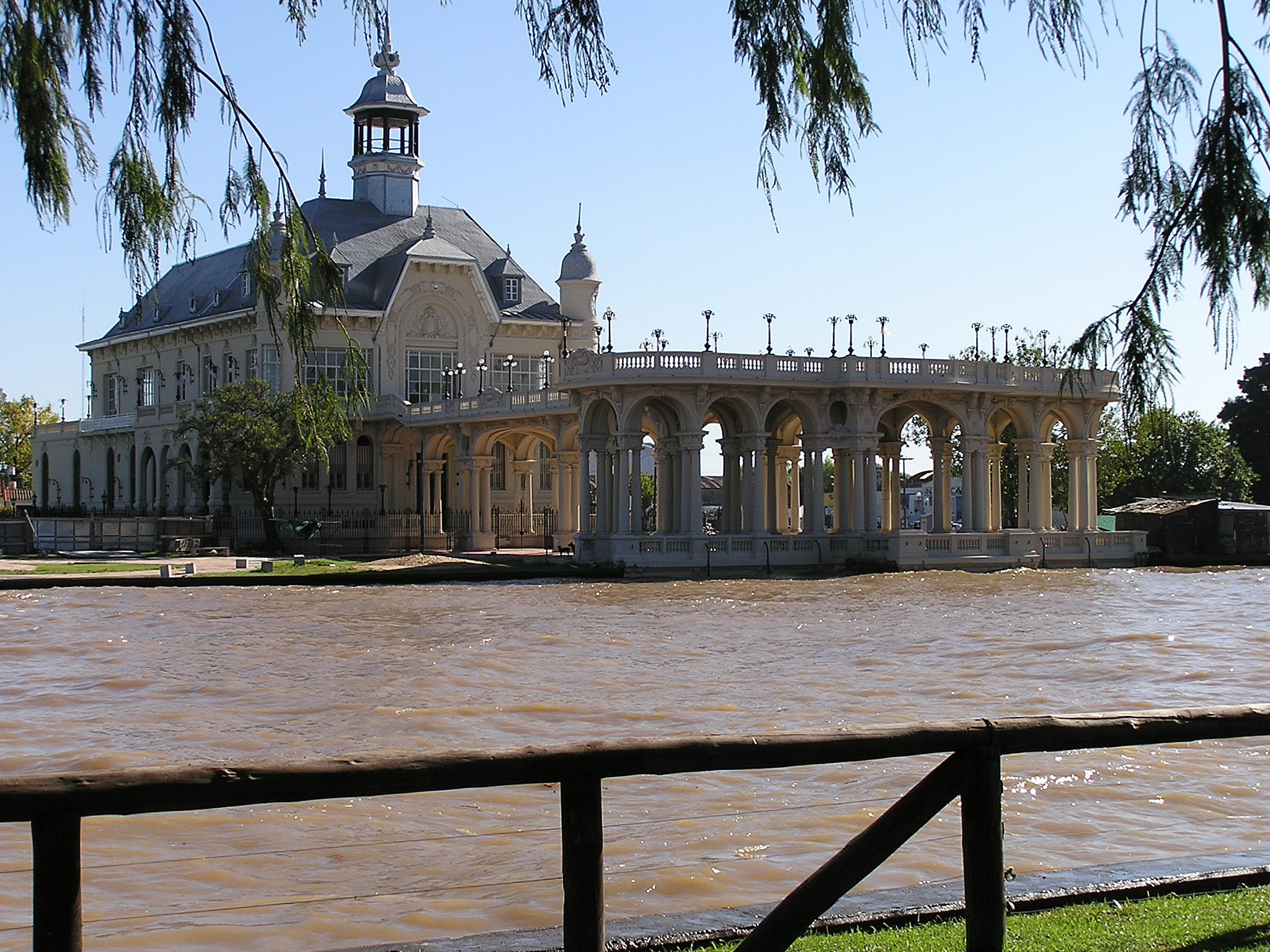
Tigre, Buenos Aires, Argentina

The race recommenced on day 17 from São Paulo in Brazil and finished in Tigre on the Parana River Delta, just north of the Argentinian capital Buenos Aires, a distance of approximately 2,250 kilometres (1,400 mi).

The teams faced a choice of which countries, if any, to traverse to reach Argentina. For Jeff & Freddy the choice of route (via Paraguay) was determined by a work opportunity at a camp site just outside the Brazilian city of Cascavel. Although first to depart the checkpoint, they just missed a bus to Cascavel and had to wait another six hours for the next service.

Kelly & Jeremy made the decision to cross into Argentina directly from Brazil at Foz do Iguaçu. Whilst there they took the opportunity to see Iguazu Falls before crossing the border (most likely via the Fraternity Bridge) into Argentina at Puerto Iguazú.

Scott & Sam selected a route that would take them through relatively expensive Uruguay in the hope that they could command higher wages for any work they did there. Initially they travelled by train on the Serra Verde Express to Curitiba in the state of Paraná and then took a long distance bus to the Uruguayan capital of Montevideo.

Kola & Mary Ellen wanted to attend a Saint Patrick's Day festival to celebrate their Irish roots in the Brazilian city of Porto Alegre which also dictated that they use Uruguay as a stepping stone to Argentina. The bus to Porto Alegre broke down en route and the pair missed the celebrations, but worse was yet to come. Having successfully taken a bus to Punta del Este in Uruguay for a budget boosting job, Kola realized he had left his passport on board. Without it he and Mary Ellen would not be able to cross the border into Argentina and their race would effectively be over. Disheartened, the pair pressed ahead to their job in a vineyard, where much to the relief of Kola, learned the passport was with lost property in Montevideo.

Jeff & Freddy crossed the Friendship Bridge from Brazil into Ciudad del Este, Paraguay and then caught a bus to the Paraguay-Argentina border at Encarnación where they took the Posadas-Encarnación International Train across the San Roque González de Santa Cruz Bridge to Posados in Argentina and then an onward bus direct to Tigre in the Parana River Delta. Already in Argentina, Kelly & Jeremy took a bus to Concordia where they planned a day of sightseeing and Tango dancing. Scott & Sam entered Argentina via a very expensive ferry across the River Plate from Montevideo to Buenos Aires, but not before working in an Asado restaurant to recoup some funds. Meanwhile Kola & Mary Ellen took a much cheaper overnight bus between the two capital cities.

Arriving into Tigre on Day 21 the teams were initially instructed to take a water taxi towards the Museum of Art and then commandeer it onto the Delta Eco Hotel. Scott & Sam arrived first, with Kelly & Jeremy arriving almost 7 hours later. They were followed by Kola & Mary Ellen in third place and eventually Jeff & Freddy now bringing up the rear.

Order	Teams	Route	Hours behind leaders	Money left
1	Scott & Sam	São Paulo → Curitiba → Montevideo → Buenos Aires → Tigre	—N/a	29%
2	Kelly & Jeremy	São Paulo → Foz do Iguaçu → Puerto Iguazú → Concordia → Tigre	6 hours 40 minutes	30%
3	Kola & Mary Ellen	São Paulo → Porto Alegre → Punta del Este → Montevideo → Buenos Aires → Tigre	10 hours 4 minutes	19%
4	Jeff & Freddy	São Paulo → Cascavel → Foz do Iguaçu → Ciudad del Este → Encarnación → Posadas → Tigre	10 hours 46 minutes	38%

=== Leg 5: Tigre, Buenos Aires, Argentina → Tilcara, Argentina ===
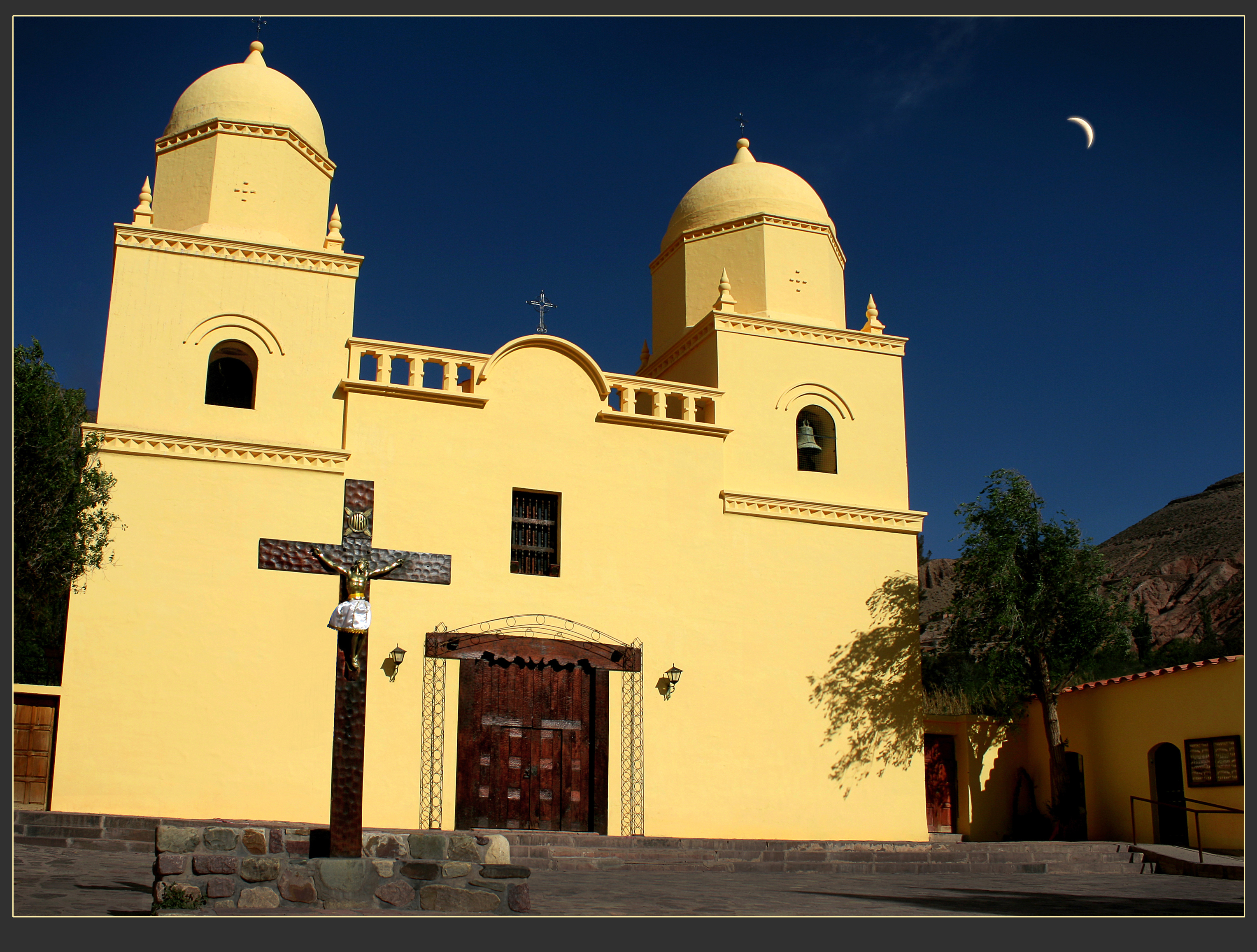
Tilcara, Argentina

The penultimate leg started on day 22 from Tigre just north of the Argentinian capital Buenos Aires and finished in Tilcara, approximately 1,800 kilometres (1,100 mi) north-west in Jujuy province of the same country.

The first two teams to leave back-tracked to Buenos Aires from Tigre by train. From the capital Scott & Sam caught an onward bus to Empedrado. When Kelly & Jeremy departed some six hours later they spotted a job opportunity near Córdoba at a vineyard in the town of Villa Giardino and made their way there as it promised both good pay and free bed & board. The third and fourth placed teams avoided the capital and found themselves making nearby El Talar their first port of call. Kola & Mary Ellen, desperately short of funds, pressed onward to Gaucho country and the town of Esquina to work with the livestock on a ranch and tried their hand at sheep shearing and horse riding. Whilst at the ranch Kola reflected on the death of his father from Dementia.

When Jeff & Freddy left at almost midnight on day 22 they had few transport options, so they caught a taxi to El Talar and managed to find seats on an overnight bus to Córdoba. From there they took another bus to San José de las Salinas, where they secured a bed for the night in a hotel near the Salinas Grandes salt flats in return for a housekeeping shift.

In Empedrado Scott & Sam undertook a shift washing cars and were rewarded with a buggy ride amongst the dunes along the Paraná River. Stranded in the small town, their meagre earnings were wiped out by the cost of a hotel room for the night. The next day they caught a bus to Corrientes, a city which Kola & Mary Ellen were also headed towards. The two teams crossed paths at the bus station. With no direct buses from Corrientes to Tilcara both teams caught a bus to Salta and then took a taxi to Tilcara.

Jeff & Freddy gambled on a taxi from San José de las Salinas to a remote town called Frías as they were reluctant to backtrack all the way to Córdoba, whilst Kelly & Jeremy chose the opposite approach and headed back to the transport hub of Córdoba when they had finished at the vineyard. With very limited options in Frías, Jeff & Freddy caught another northbound bus that only took them as far as San Miguel de Tucumán. In Córdoba with six hours to kill Kelly & Jeremy took the time to visit the Cathedral before catching an overnight bus to the city of San Salvador de Jujuy. By the time Jeff & Freddy reached San Miguel de Tucumán they had managed to secure tickets onwards to the same city, thanks to a fellow passenger. At the bus station the two teams missed each other by a matter of minutes. Jeff & Freddy made it onto an onward bus, whilst Kelly & Jeremy chose to take a taxi instead of waiting for the next service.

After travelling through the Quebrada de Humahuaca valley, the four teams arrived in the rarefied atmosphere of Tilcara at almost the same time. They were first directed to the market and then to the checkpoint at the Las Marias Hotel behind the Nuestra Señora del Rosario church. A foot race ensued between Kola & Mary Ellen and Jeff & Freddy, with the former duo arriving first, just seven minutes before the latter. They were followed by Scott & Sam, another eight minutes later, and then finally Kelly & Jeremy, twenty-four minutes after them.

Order	Teams	Route	Hours behind leaders	Money left
1	Kola & Mary Ellen	Tigre → El Talar → Esquina → Corrientes → Salta → Tilcara	—N/a	10%
2	Jeff & Freddy	Tigre → El Talar → Córdoba → San José de las Salinas → Frías → San Miguel de Tucumán → San Salvador de Jujuy → Tilcara	7 minutes	28%
3	Scott & Sam	Tigre → Buenos Aires → Empedrado → Corrientes → Salta → Tilcara	15 minutes	17%
4	Kelly & Jeremy	Tigre → Buenos Aires → Córdoba → Villa Giardino → Córdoba → San Salvador de Jujuy → Tilcara	39 minutes	20%

=== Leg 6: Tilcara, Argentina → Frutillar, Chile ===
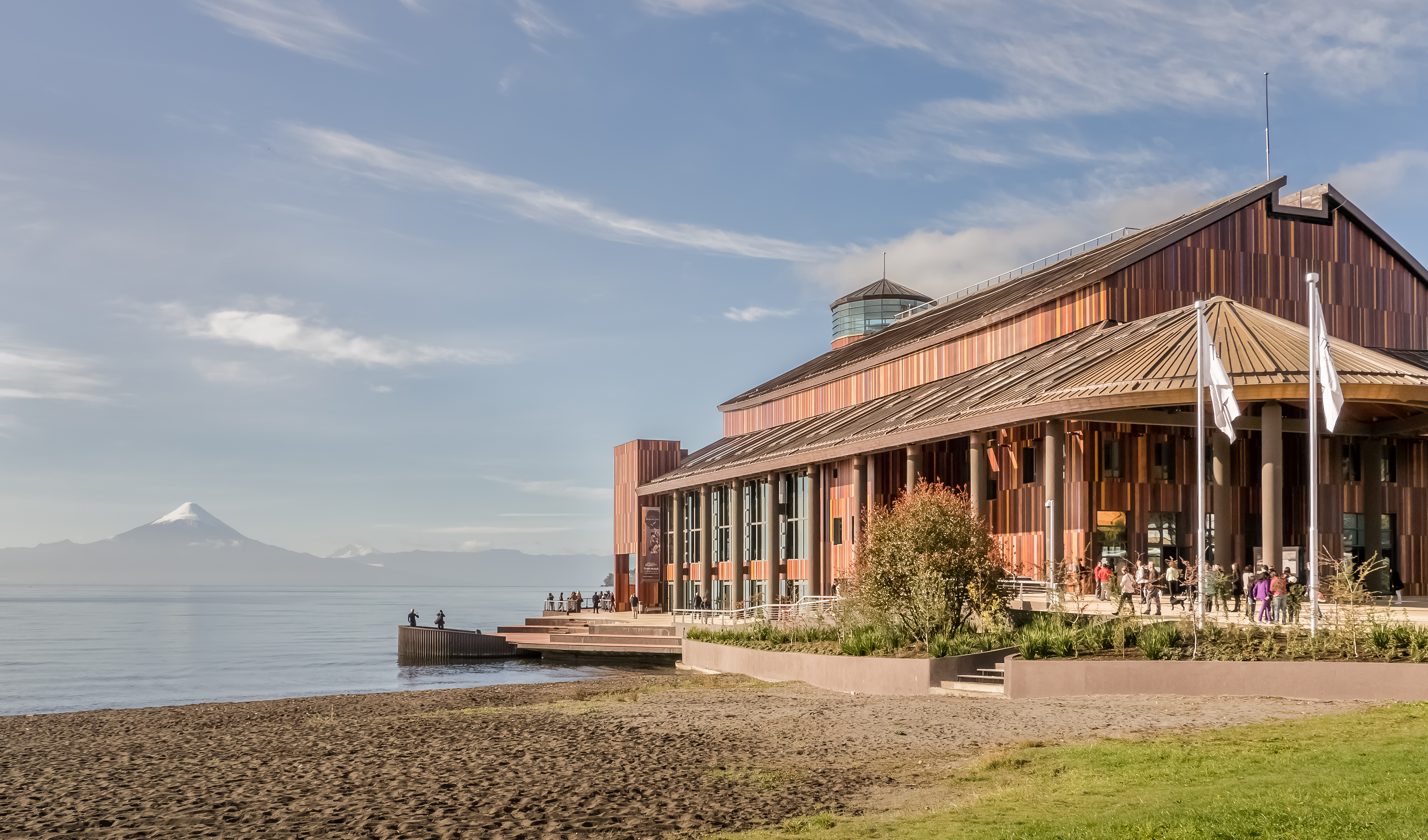
Frutillar, Chile

The last and longest leg of the race started on day 27 from Tilcara in Argentina to Frutillar, 2,750 kilometres (1,710 mi) away in the Los Lagos region of southern Chile.

All four teams left within an hour of each other at daybreak. With dwindling funds and the uncertainty of which country was more expensive, they were faced with a choice of where and when to cross the planet's third longest land border.

Kola & Mary Ellen decided to cross into Chile at the nearest border point (Paso de Jama) and used 20% of their remaining funds on a taxi to San Pedro de Atacama. They briefly stopped at Salinas Grandes to marvel at the salt flats before making their way to the Elqui Valley to top up funds gardening at a campsite.

With almost three times the funds as Kola & Mary Ellen and twice as much as the other two teams, Jeff & Freddy backtracked to San Salvador de Jujuy and planned for a 21-hour bus journey to Mendoza. Kelly & Jeremy and Scott & Sam also chose this route. Rather than wait for the bus, Kelly & Jeremy made a rare budgetary error by splashing out on a taxi for the initial part of the journey which cost five times as much as public transport. Having gained absolutely no advantage, they were reunited with Jeff & Freddy less than 90 minutes later at the bus terminal in San Salvador de Jujuy, where they were joined by Scott & Sam not long after. And so it was that three teams found themselves in each other's company for the long journey south. Arriving in Mendoza a day later, the three teams finally parted ways, heading in different directions.

Jeff & Freddy took some time out to rest and recuperate at the nearby thermal springs in Chacheuta, but having missed the bus back to the city they had to hitch a lift from some passing motorists who advised them it would be faster to reach Frutillar via Santiago. Scott & Sam had already decided on this course of action and were making good progress along the Paso Internacional Los Libertadores towards the capital Santiago despite the Easter holiday traffic. Meanwhile Kelly & Jeremy pressed on deeper into southern Argentina, but the bus to Neuquén broke down jeopardising their onward connection to San Carlos de Bariloche. They needn't have worried though as the onward bus through Patagonia was also several hours late, but on arrival in San Carlos de Bariloche the border crossing had shut for the night necessitating an overnight stay.

With funds almost exhausted Scott & Sam took a job with a Completo vendor, before spending some on a cable car ride up San Cristóbal Hill. They then caught a bus to Frutillar just as Kola & Mary Ellen arrived into the capital to catch their onward connection.

Next morning, having found themselves diverted to Rancagua, Jeff & Freddy caught a southbound bus to Concepción.

When Scott & Sam and Kola & Mary Ellen arrived in Frutillar they were first directed to the Teatro del Lago and then instructed to make their way a further 25 miles (40 km) to Ensenada. Kola & Mary Ellen took a taxi with what little remained of their funds whilst Scott & Sam opted for a boat across Lake Llanquihue. Here they were told to head to the base station at the foot of the 2,652 metres (8,701 ft) Osorno volcano. Having taken another taxi, when the two teams arrived they found themselves without sufficient money for the chairlift to the finish point marked by a Chilean flag.

The race ended on day 30, with Scott & Sam finishing in first place. Kola & Mary Ellen arrived second, two hours and twenty minutes later. It was the following day before the two remaining teams reached the finish point. Jeff & Freddy finished third, whilst Kelly & Jeremy were last.

Order	Teams	Route	Hours behind leaders	Money left
1	Scott & Sam	Tilcara → San Salvador de Jujuy → Mendoza → Santiago → Frutillar → Ensenada → Volcán Osorno	—N/a	1% (£24.02)
2	Kola & Mary Ellen	Tilcara → San Pedro de Atacama → Elqui Valley → Santiago → Frutillar → Ensenada → Volcán Osorno	2 hours 20 minutes	1% (£29.12)
3	Jeff & Freddy	Tilcara → San Salvador de Jujuy → Mendoza → Cacheuta → Mendoza → Rancagua → Concepción → Frutillar → Ensenada → Volcán Osorno	20 hours 14 minutes	5% (£101.87)
4	Kelly & Jeremy	Tilcara → San Salvador de Jujuy → Mendoza → Neuquén → San Carlos de Bariloche → Frutillar → Ensenada → Volcán Osorno	21 hours 36 minutes	0.5% (£10.90)

== Ratings ==
Episode no.	Airdate	7 days		28 days	
Episode no.	Airdate	Total viewers (millions)	Ranking (all channels)	Total viewers (millions)	Ranking (all channels)
1	14 August 2024	5.74	1	7.90	1
2	21 August 2024	5.80	1	7.65	1
3	28 August 2024	5.71	1	7.17	1
4	4 September 2024	5.43	1	7.16	1
5	11 September 2024	5.40	3	6.89	3
6	18 September 2024	5.46	2	6.85	2

== Critical reception ==
Opinions on the first episode of the second celebrity series were favourable overall. Daisy Jones of The Guardian awarded the opening episode 4 stars out of 5, stating "It's utterly, wonderfully captivating TV," as did Vicky Jessop of the Evening Standard who opined "it's still got the magic." Anita Singh of The Telegraph also awarded the opener 4 stars, commenting that it was "the funniest series yet – despite the obscure contestants."
