= Lottie Moss =

British model (born 1998)

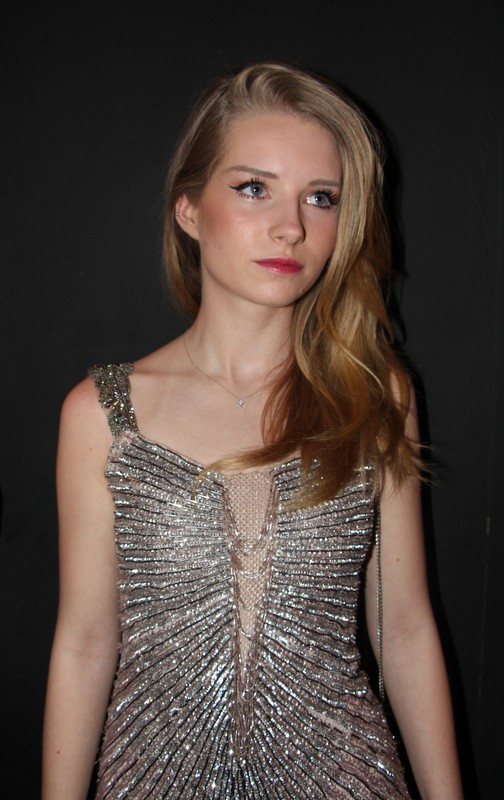
- Moss in 2015
- Born: Charlotte Moss; 9 January 1998 (age 28)
- Occupation: Fashion model
- Relatives: Kate Moss (half-sister); Lila Moss (niece)

Charlotte Moss (born 9 January 1998) is an English fashion model and the younger half-sister of supermodel Kate Moss.

== Early life ==
Charlotte Moss, known as Lottie, is the daughter of Inger Solnordal and travel agent Peter Moss. Through her father, she is the younger half-sister of model Kate Moss and is the aunt of Kate's daughter Lila Moss.

== Career ==
Lottie Moss was discovered at the 2011 wedding of Kate Moss where she was a bridesmaid.

Her subsequent employment with Storm Management existed from at least 2014. Moss's first photoshoot was an appearance in Teen Vogue. Moss's first full editorial was via Dazed magazine. That same year she was also featured in a series of ads for Calvin Klein, whom her half-sister had also modelled for.

Moss was first shown on a Vogue front-cover during 2016, appearing on the cover of Paris Vogue alongside model Lucky Blue Smith.

In 2021, Moss announced she would be selling nude photos of herself on the content subscription service OnlyFans. Moss defended the decision by saying she was a "very sexual person". In an interview with the Private Parts podcast Moss revealed that because her career had heavily benefited from nepotism she had an uncomfortable relationship with fame. She further explained that she enjoyed the control she had in the creation of her own content.

In 2025, Moss appeared as a contestant on Netflix's reality competition television series, Celebrity Bear Hunt.

== Personal life ==
Moss identifies as pansexual. In November 2020, Moss revealed she had been given an ADHD diagnosis.

In December 2022, Moss shared a TikTok clip of her getting a face tattoo of the word "lover" underneath her right eye.
