= Kola Bokinni =

British actor (born 1992)

Kola Bokinni Actor
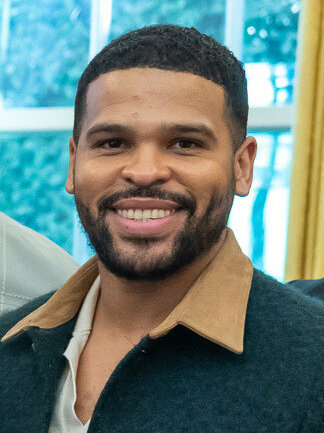
- Born: 5 August 1992 (age 34); Peckham, London, England
- Education: BRIT School
- Occupation: Actor
- Years active: 2015–present
- Notable work: Top Boy; Ted Lasso
- Relatives: Yinka Bokinni (sister)

Kola Bokinni (born 5 August 1992) is an English actor. He is known for his role as Isaac McAdoo, the captain of AFC Richmond, in the Apple TV+ series Ted Lasso (2020–2023). He also participated in Celebrity Bear Hunt (2025).

== Early life ==
Bokinni's mother is Irish (d. 2008), and his father is Nigerian (d. 2022). He attended the BRIT School, initially on Saturdays before an opportunity opened up to attend the main school. His first public performance was an original play, first performed at the Bussey in Peckham, before moving to the Royal Court Theatre in Sloane Square. Following good reviews for his performance he signed with his first agent.

== Career ==
Bokinni played Lennard in a 2016 episode of Black Mirror entitled "Men Against Fire". He also had a recurring role as Leyton on the television series Top Boy.

From 2020 he played Isaac McAdoo, the AFC Richmond centre-back and vice-captain, and then captain on the Apple TV+ series Ted Lasso with his character maturing during his portrayal from immature and a "bully" to a leadership role. With members of the ensemble cast of Ted Lasso, he visited The White House and met President Biden and Vice-president Kamala Harris. Bokinni has spoken about the teamwork and camaraderie on the set of Ted Lasso. He described having his Ted Lasso character turned into a playable character with his likeness in the video game FIFA as "something I don't think I'll ever be able to get over".

== Personal life ==
Bokinni is a footballer himself, and is a fan of Arsenal. He typically plays football more as an attacker than his defence-playing character from Ted Lasso. He is good friends with fellow actor Will Poulter, and his sister is broadcaster and DJ Yinka Bokinni.

== Selected filmography ==
Key
†	Denotes works that have not yet been released

Year	Title	Role	Notes
2016	Black Mirror	Lennard	Episode: "Men Against Fire"
2019	Top Boy	Leyton	Recurring character
2020—2023	Ted Lasso	Isaac	Recurring character
2024	Celebrity Race Across the World series 2	Himself	
2025	Celebrity Bear Hunt	Himself (contestant)	Series 1

== Awards and nominations ==
Year	Association	Category	Project	Result	Ref.
2022	Screen Actors Guild Awards	Outstanding Performance by an Ensemble in a Comedy Series	Ted Lasso	Won	
2023	Hollywood Music in Media Awards	Song – Onscreen Performance (TV Show/Limited Series)	"So Long, Farewell" (from Ted Lasso)	Nominated	
2024	Screen Actors Guild Awards	Outstanding Performance by an Ensemble in a Comedy Series	Ted Lasso	Nominated	
