= Aracati Airport =

Canoa Quebrada Dragão do Mar Regional Airport Aeroporto Regional de Canoa Quebrada Dragão do Mar

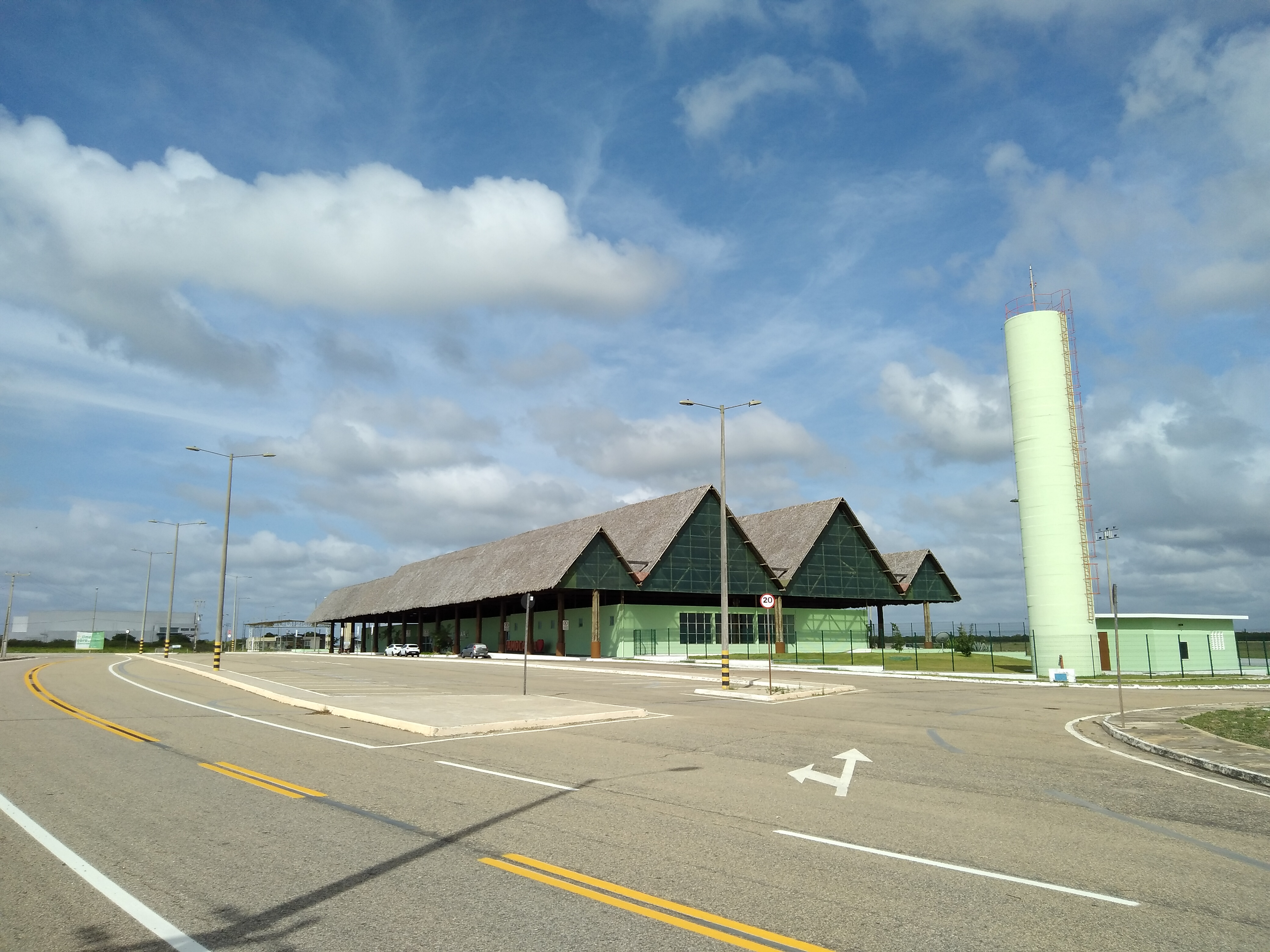
- IATA: ARX; ICAO: SBAC

Summary
- Airport type: Public
- Operator: Socicam (?–2023); Infraero (2023–2025); Dix Empreendimentos (2025-2025); GRU Airport (2025-present)
- Serves: Aracati
- Opened: August 10, 2012
- Time zone: BRT (UTC−03:00)
- Elevation AMSL: 36 m (118 ft)
- Coordinates: 04°34′07″S 037°48′17″W
- Website: www4.infraero.gov.br/aeroporto-de-aracati/

Map
- Location in Brazil

Runways
Direction	Length		Surface
Direction	m	ft	Surface
09/27	1,800	5,906	Asphalt

Statistics (2024)
- Passengers: 3,313
- Aircraft Operations: 787
- Metric tonnes of cargo: 0
- Statistics: Infraero; Sources: Airport Website, ANAC, DECEA

Canoa Quebrada Dragão do Mar Regional Airport (IATA: ARX, ICAO: SBAC) is the airport serving Aracati and the beach resort Canoa Quebrada, Brazil.

It is managed by GRU Airport.

== History ==
The airport was commissioned on August 10, 2012.

Previously operated by Socicam, on August 23, 2023, the State of Ceará signed a contract of operation with Infraero. However, on April 15, 2025, a new one-year contract was signed with Dix Empreendimentos.

On November 27, 2025, GRU Airport won the concession to operate the airport.

== Airlines and destinations ==
Airlines	Destinations
Azul Brazilian Airlines	Belo Horizonte–Confins

== Access ==
The airport is located 6 km (4 mi) from downtown Aracati and 20 km (12 mi) from Canoa Quebrada.

== See also ==
- List of airports in Brazil
