= Celebrity Bear Hunt =

2025 reality television series

- Genre: Reality competition
- Presented by: Holly Willoughby
- Starring: Bear Grylls
- Countries of origin: United Kingdom, United States
- Original language: English
- No. of series: 1
- No. of episodes: 8

Production
- Executive producers: Bear Grylls; Delbert Shoopman; Ben Mitchell; Olly Nash; Saul Fearnley; Charlie Bennett
- Production companies: The Natural Studios; Workerbee; Talkback

Original release
- Network: Netflix
- Release: 5 February 2025

Celebrity Bear Hunt is a British reality competition television series starring Bear Grylls, and presented by Holly Willoughby. The series premiered on Netflix on 5 February 2025. Set in a jungle in Costa Rica, twelve celebrities become prey as they are hunted down by Grylls.

== Production ==
In March 2024, Netflix announced a reality competition series starring British survival expert, adventurer, and television presenter Bear Grylls, and presented by British television presenter Holly Willoughby, at their "Next on Netflix" showcase in London.

The series was executive produced by Grylls, Delbert Shoopman, Ben Mitchell, Olly Nash, Saul Fearnley, and Charlie Bennett. Production companies involved in the series are Grylls's The Natural Studios, Banijay UK's Workerbee, and Talkback.

On 3 June 2025, it was announced the show had been axed after just one series.

== Celebrities ==
Celebrity	Known for	Status
Big Zuu	Rapper & television personality	Champion Episode 8
Steph McGovern	Broadcaster	Runner Up Episode 8
Una Healy	Former The Saturdays singer	Runner Up Episode 8
Lottie Moss	Model	Eliminated Episode 8
Kola Bokinni	Actor	Eliminated Episode 8
Joe Thomas	Actor and comedian	Eliminated Episode 7
Shirley Ballas	Strictly Come Dancing head judge	Eliminated Episode 7
Danny Cipriani	Retired rugby union player	Eliminated Episode 6
Mel B	Spice Girls singer	Eliminated Episode 5
Boris Becker	Retired tennis player	Withdrew Episode 4
Laurence Llewelyn-Bowen	Television personality & interior designer	Eliminated Episode 4
Leomie Anderson	Model	Eliminated Episode 2

== Overall results ==
ParticipantS	1	2	3	4	5	6	7	Final
Big Zuu	Safe	Safe	Nominated	Safe	Nominated	Safe	Nominated	WINNER
Steph	Nominated	Safe	Safe	Nominated	Exempt	Safe	Nominated	FINALISTS
Una	Safe	Nominated	Nominated	Safe	Safe	Safe	Nominated	FINALISTS
Lottie	Safe	Safe	Nominated	Safe	Safe	Nominated	Eliminateds	
Kola	Safe	Nominated	Safe	Nominated	Safe	Nominated	Eliminateds	
Joe	Safe	Safe	Safe	Safe	Nominated	Eliminated		
Shirley	Safe	Saved	Safe	Nominated	Eliminated			
Danny	Safe	Nominated	Safe	Eliminated				
Mel B	Nominated	Safe	Eliminated					
Boris	Safe	Safe	Withdrawn					
Laurence	Nominated	Eliminated						
Leomie	Eliminated							

Color	Description
	Won the challenge and continues in the competition.
	Lost the challenge but was saved by Bear.
	Nominated but did not compete due to medical condition.
	Nominated but not captured.
	Nominated and captured.
	Nominated, captured, and eliminated from the competition.
	Withdrew from the competition due to injury.

== Release ==
The series was released on Netflix on 5 February 2025.
