= Salinas Grandes (Jujuy and Salta) =

Salt flats in the provinces of Jujuy and Salta, Argentina

Coordinates: 23.6333°S 66.0833°W

The Salinas Grandes are located in the north in the provinces of Jujuy and Salta (in Argentina), at an average altitude of 3,450 meters (11,320 feet) above sea level. It covers an area of 212 km^{2} (82 sq mi) and is well-known for its vast white desert. The desert is about 320 km (200 mi) long.

== Overview ==
The region is of industrial importance for its sodium and potassium. It is also being explored for the lithium brine beneath its salt, 300,100 hectares (742,000 acres) of it were awarded to LSC Lithium for development. The exploitation of lithium reserves drew criticism from Indigenous community leaders for the steep decline in groundwater levels, threatening local farming. Also, they regarded their right to have use and control over the land as violated.

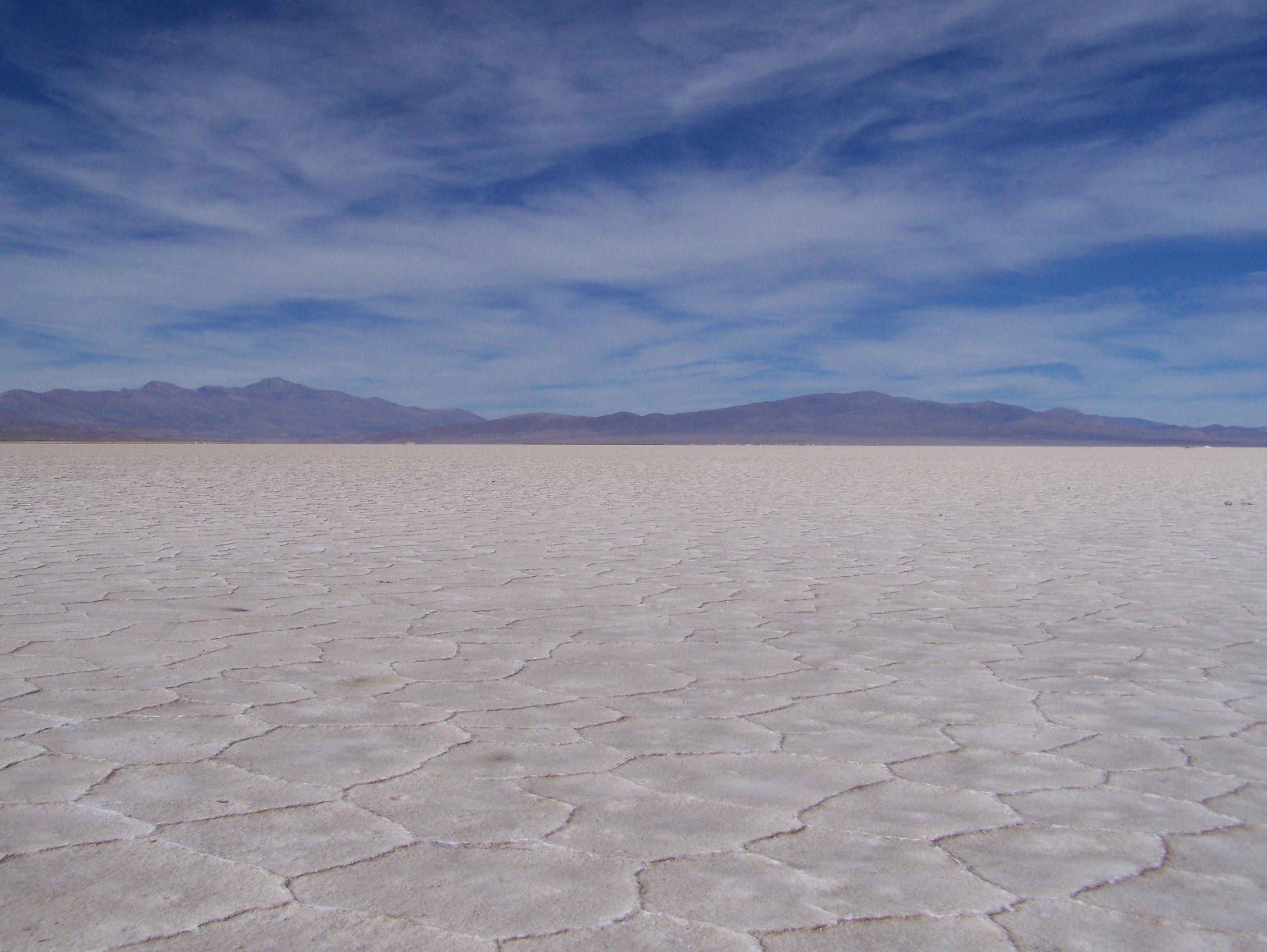

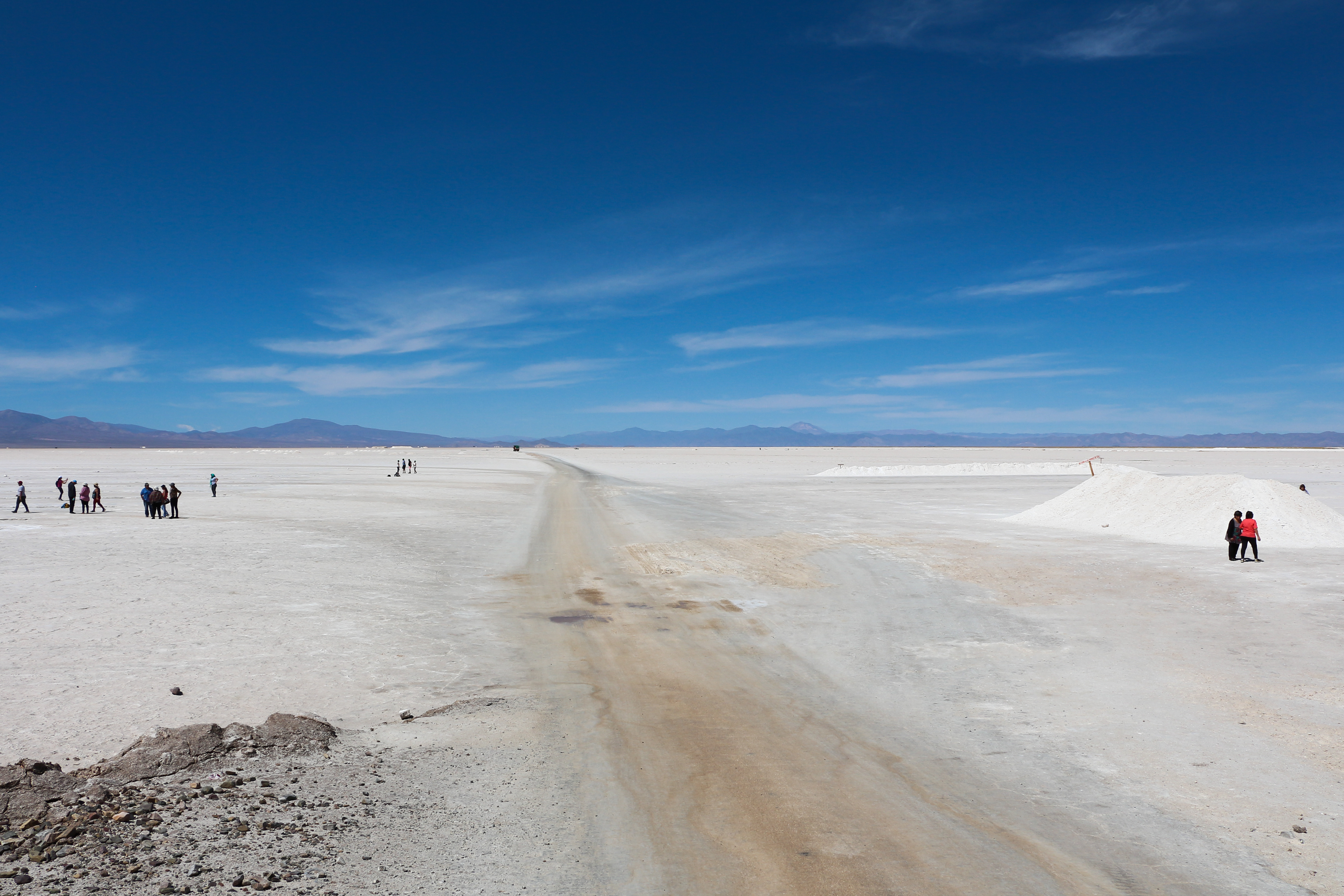

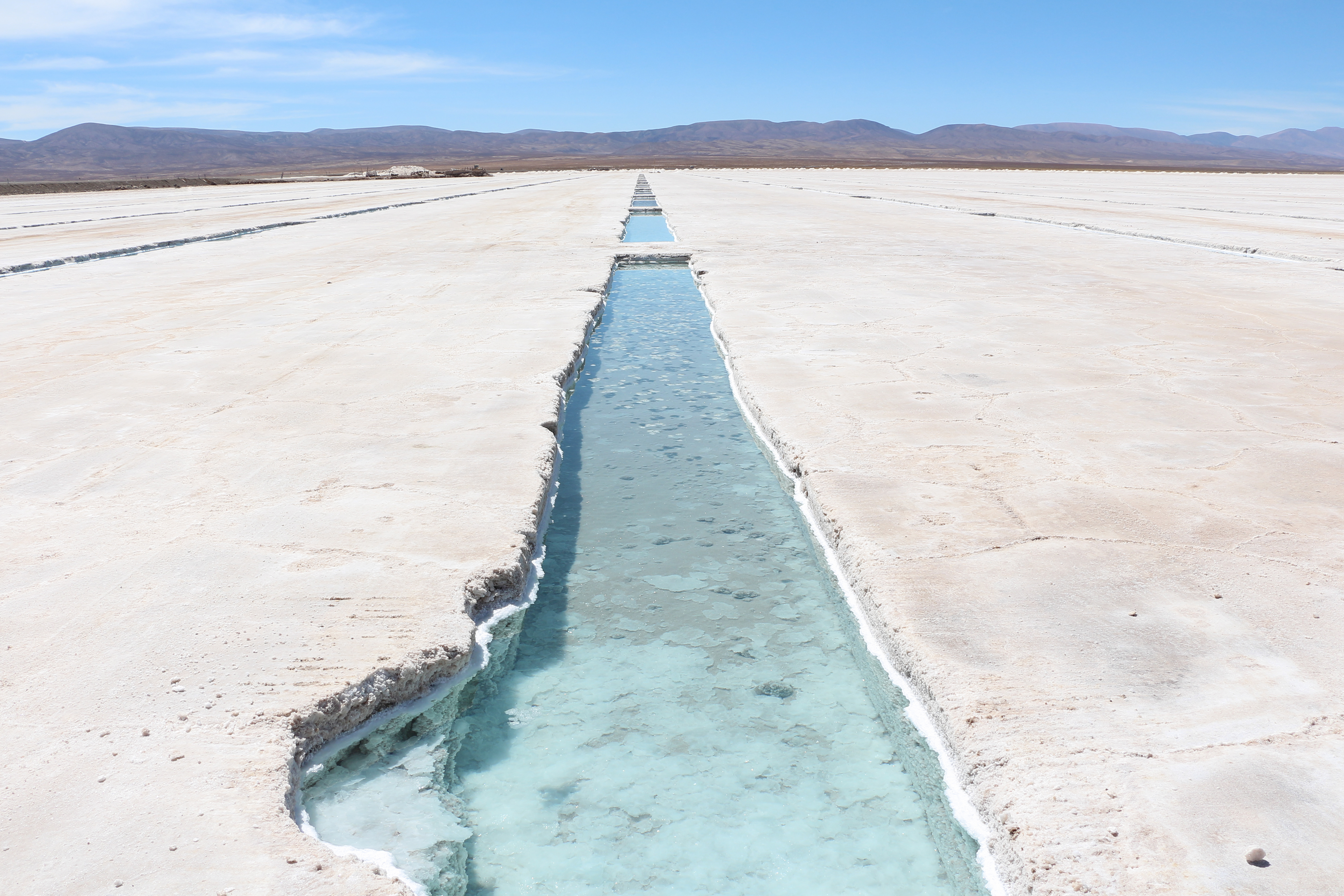

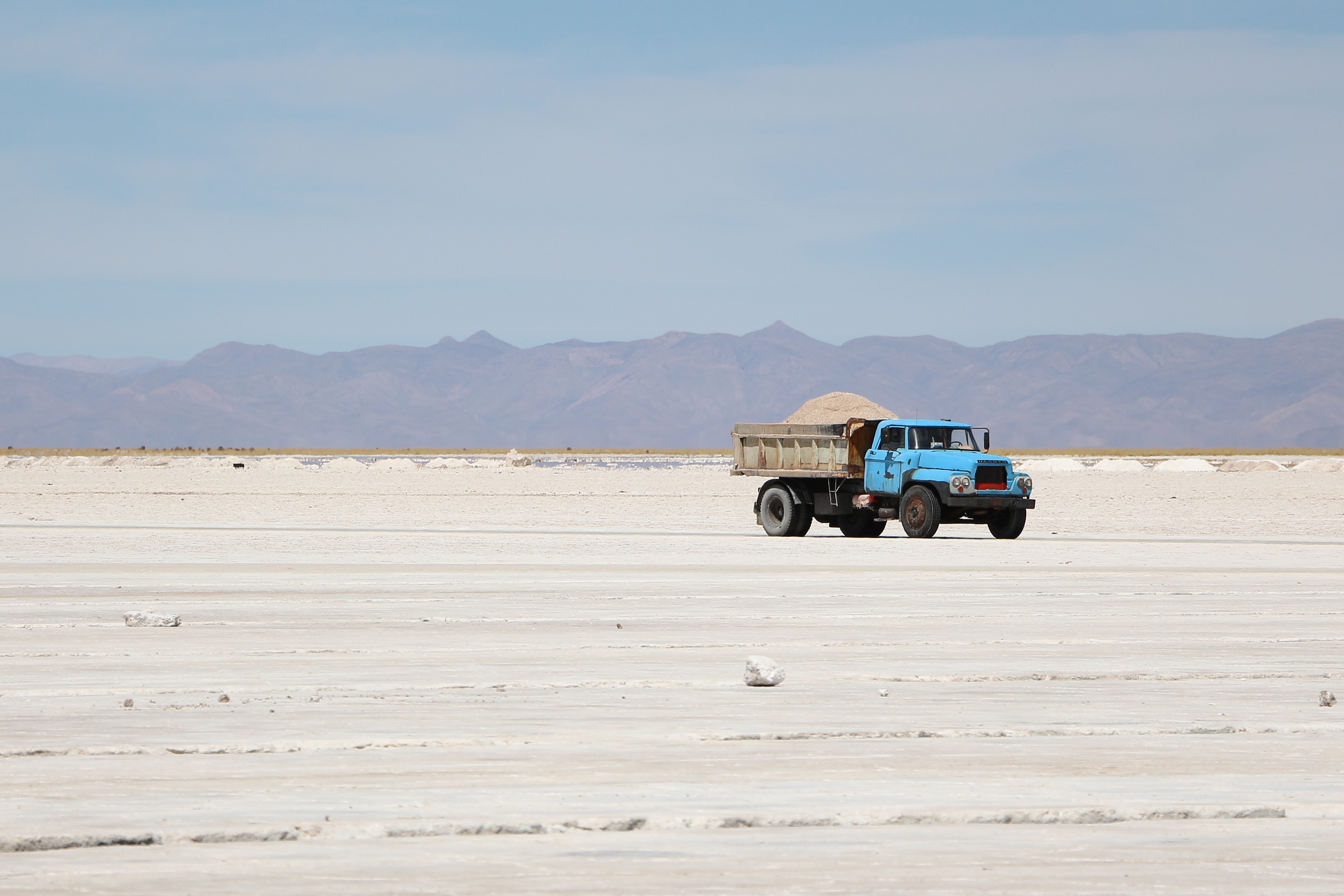
