= Canoa Quebrada =

Beach resort in Brazil

Coordinates: 4°31′42″S 37°41′34″W

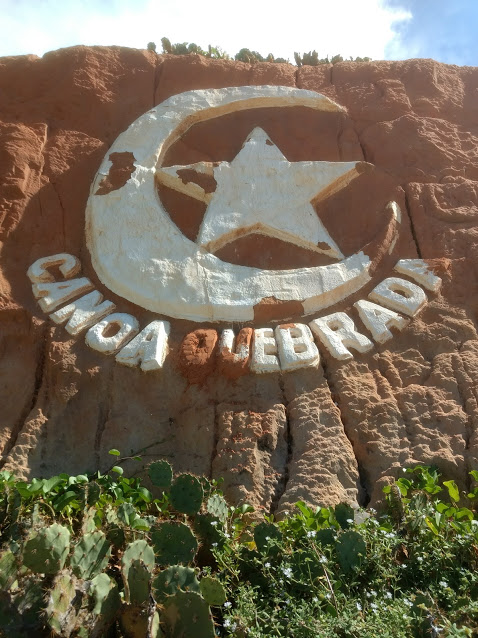
The symbol of the beach

Canoa Quebrada (meaning broken canoe in Portuguese), known as the pearl of the east coast of Ceará, Brazil, is an international tourist beach resort 164 km from Fortaleza, in the municipality of Aracati.

This small fishing village, among dunes and cliffs, has good views and is becoming popular with tourists. The main street of Canoa, where most accommodation, restaurants and shops are concentrated, is popularly known as 'Broadway, although its real name is "Rua Dragão do Mar" in honor of Francisco José do Nascimento, a hero of the abolitionist movement in Ceará, who in 1881 refused to transport slaves to be sold further south in the country.

The Tourism Authority of Ceará rates Canoa Quebrada as the most important tourist attraction of the state, after Fortaleza.

Tourist activities include outdoor activities such as excursions in dune buggies, horse riding, sailing in a 'jangada' boat, mountain biking, sandboarding, kitesurfing and windsurfing*.

The beach, dunes and cliffs are protected by the Canoa Quebrada Environmental Protection Area, a municipal conservation unit established on 20 March 1998. The protected area was created to regulate occupation and land use along Aracati's coastal ecosystems, while the municipal government monitors the cliffs for erosion and irregular construction.

The location is served by Canoa Quebrada Dragão do Mar Regional Airport, located near Aracati.

== Weather ==
The region's climate is semi-arid. The average annual temperature is around 27 °C – with an average annual high of 38 °C, and a low of 21 °C. The sun is present almost all year long, with rain usually only between March and May.

== City details ==
- State: Ceará
- Region: Northeast
- Population: 65,292 inhabitants (District of Aracati)
- AREA CODE: (88)

== Distances ==
- Fortaleza: 167 km (104 mi)
- Russas: 80 km (50 mi)
- Mossoró: 90 km (56 mi)
- Rio de Janeiro: 2,732 km (1,698 mi)
- São Paulo: 3,033 km (1,885 mi)
