= Itaberaba =

Municipality of Bahia, Brazil

Coordinates: 12°32′S 40°18′W

- Municipality
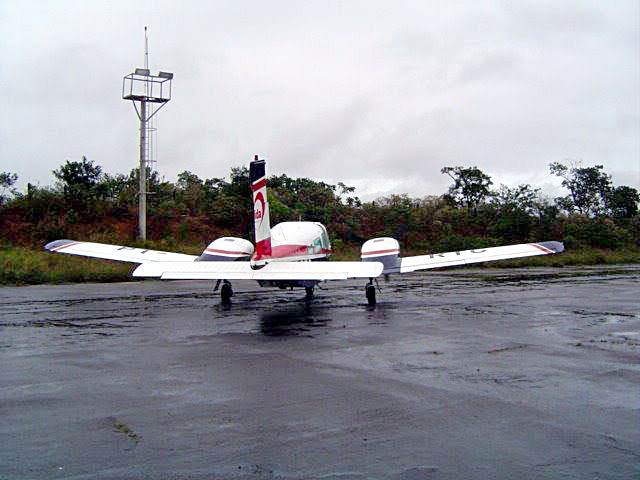
- Regional Airport Itaberaba

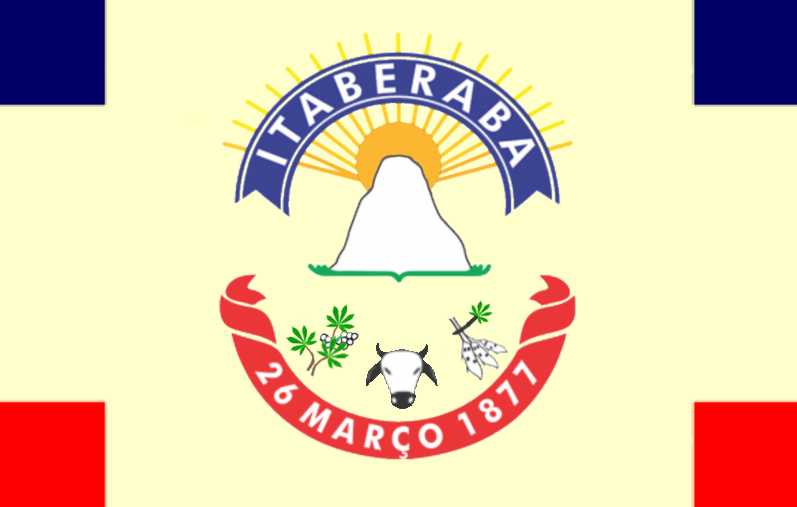
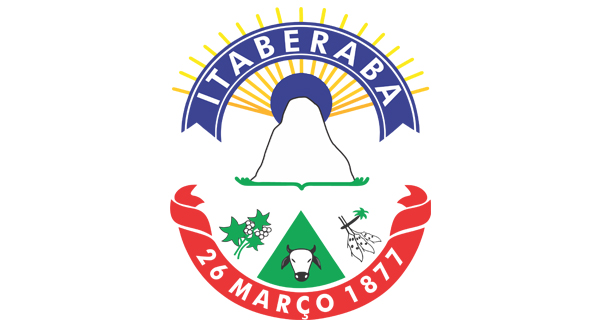
- Flag Coat of arms
- Interactive map of Itaberaba
- Country: Brazil
- Region: Nordeste
- State: Bahia

Population (2020)
  - Total: 64,646
- Time zone: UTC−3 (BRT)

Itaberaba is a municipality in the state of Bahia in the North-East region of Brazil.

The population in 2020 was 64,646.

== History ==
Before the arrival of Europeans, the area covered by the modern municipality was inhabited by "Maracás Indians" of the "Tapuias" subgroup, believed to have been strong fighters but not cannibals.

In 1768 the São Simão farmstead was established here by Captain Manuel Rodrigues Cajado.

More recently the area has become known as a center for pineapples.

== Climate ==
Climate data for Itaberaba (1981–2010)
Month	Jan	Feb	Mar	Apr	May	Jun	Jul	Aug	Sep	Oct	Nov	Dec	Year
Mean daily maximum °C (°F)	33.3 (91.9)	33.7 (92.7)	33.0 (91.4)	31.8 (89.2)	30.6 (87.1)	28.7 (83.7)	28.4 (83.1)	29.2 (84.6)	30.8 (87.4)	32.4 (90.3)	32.6 (90.7)	32.7 (90.9)	31.4 (88.5)
Daily mean °C (°F)	26.4 (79.5)	26.8 (80.2)	26.5 (79.7)	25.6 (78.1)	24.4 (75.9)	22.7 (72.9)	22.1 (71.8)	22.6 (72.7)	23.9 (75.0)	25.2 (77.4)	25.9 (78.6)	26.0 (78.8)	24.8 (76.6)
Mean daily minimum °C (°F)	20.4 (68.7)	20.9 (69.6)	20.8 (69.4)	20.0 (68.0)	18.5 (65.3)	16.6 (61.9)	15.7 (60.3)	16.3 (61.3)	17.7 (63.9)	19.6 (67.3)	20.3 (68.5)	20.5 (68.9)	18.9 (66.0)
Average precipitation mm (inches)	68.3 (2.69)	61.7 (2.43)	95.7 (3.77)	58.7 (2.31)	32.4 (1.28)	36.1 (1.42)	33.3 (1.31)	20.3 (0.80)	18.4 (0.72)	38.5 (1.52)	74.3 (2.93)	80.2 (3.16)	617.9 (24.33)
Average precipitation days (≥ 1.0 mm)	5	6	8	8	6	8	7	5	4	4	5	5	71
Average relative humidity (%)	65.3	65.6	68.9	71.7	72.3	74.9	72.6	68.7	67.1	65.0	66.7	67.4	68.9
Mean monthly sunshine hours	226.1	211.7	219.1	192.9	177.2	150.3	169.9	183.1	192.0	202.3	185.2	195.5	2,305.3
Source: Instituto Nacional de Meteorologia

== See also ==
- List of municipalities in Bahia
