= Santo Amaro do Maranhão =

Coordinates: 2.5°S 43.2539°W

- Municipality
- Coat of arms
- Interactive map of Santo Amaro do Maranhão
- Country: Brazil
- Region: Nordeste
- State: Maranhão
- Mesoregion: Norte Maranhense

Population (2020)
  - Total: 16,034
- Time zone: UTC−3 (BRT)

Santo Amaro do Maranhão is a municipality in the state of Maranhão in the Northeast region of Brazil.

The municipality contains part of the 1,535,310-hectare (3,793,800-acre) Upaon-Açu/Miritiba/Alto Preguiças Environmental Protection Area, created in 1992.

The city os Santo Amaro do Maranhão is one of the 3 that are part of Lençóis Maranhenses National Park, an uncommon landscape which mixes dunes and cristal clear lakes.

== See also ==
- List of municipalities in Maranhão
