= Hotel Unique =

Coordinates: 23.58169°S 46.66689°W

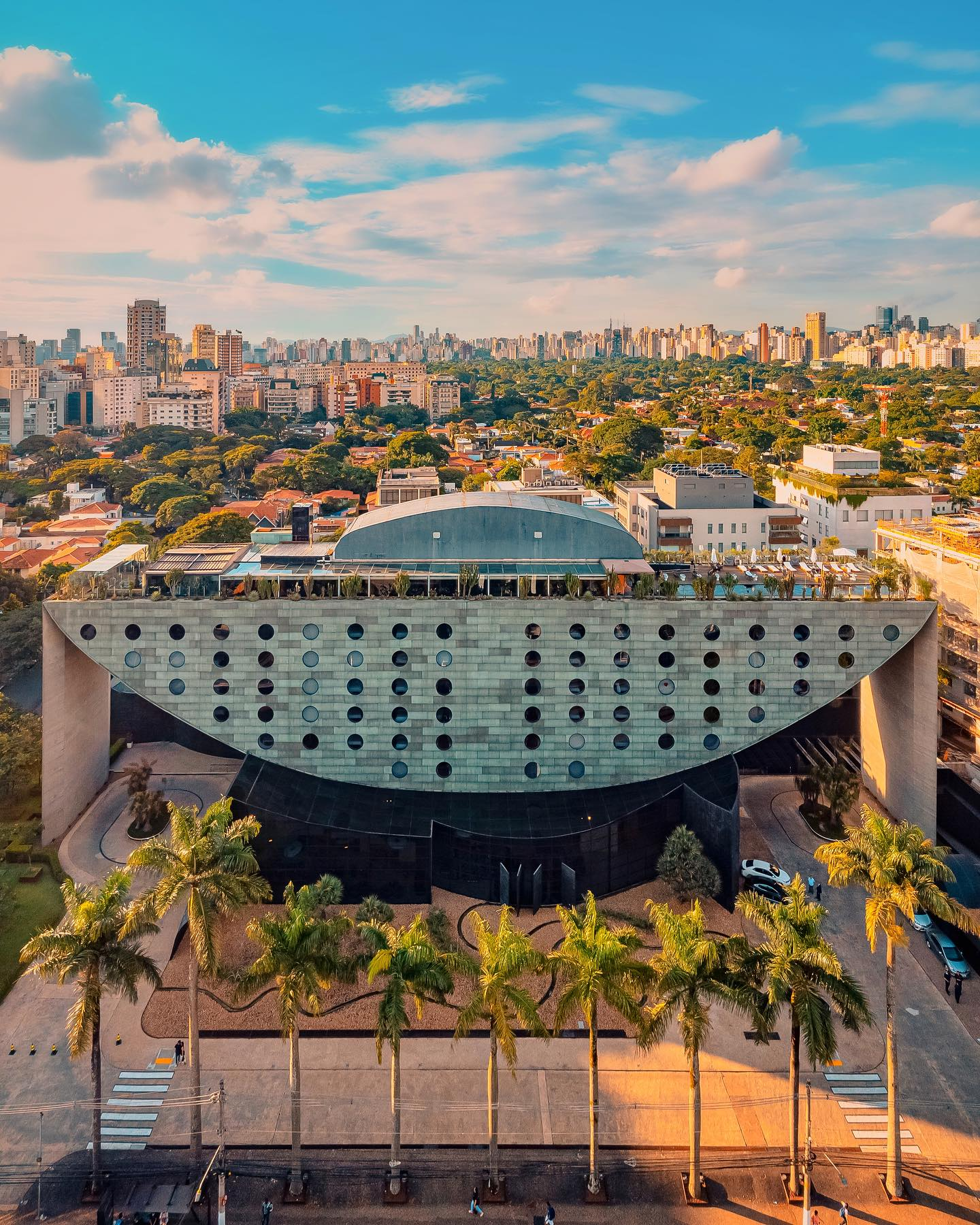
- Interactive map of the Hotel Unique area

General information
- Status: Completed
- Type: Luxury hotel
- Architectural style: Structural expressionism
- Location: São Paulo, Brazil
- Construction started: 2000
- Completed: 2002
- Opening: 2002

Technical details
- Floor count: 6

Design and construction
- Architect: Ruy Ohtake
- Structural engineer: Grupo Método

Other information
- Number of rooms: 95

The Hotel Unique is a hotel located in the district of Jardins in the Brazilian city of São Paulo, established in 2002. The 25 metres (82 ft) tall building, designed by architect Ruy Ohtake, was projected in the shape of a 100 metres (330 ft) inverted arc, taking advantage of the district's zoning limit of seven-story buildings. Its shape is compared to a boat or a watermelon.

The hotel houses 95 apartments, 10 of which are suites, and on its terrace is the restaurant Skye.

== Gallery ==
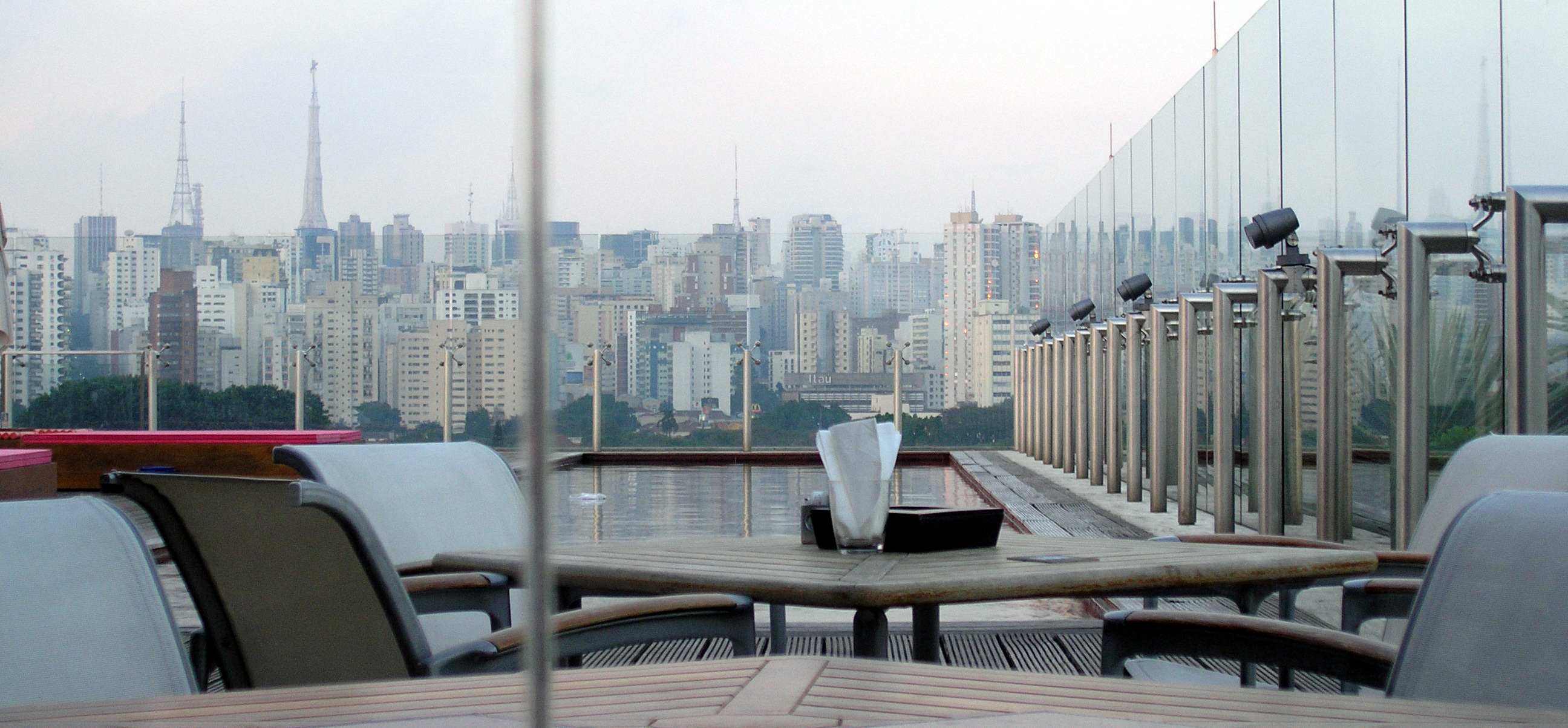
Roof view

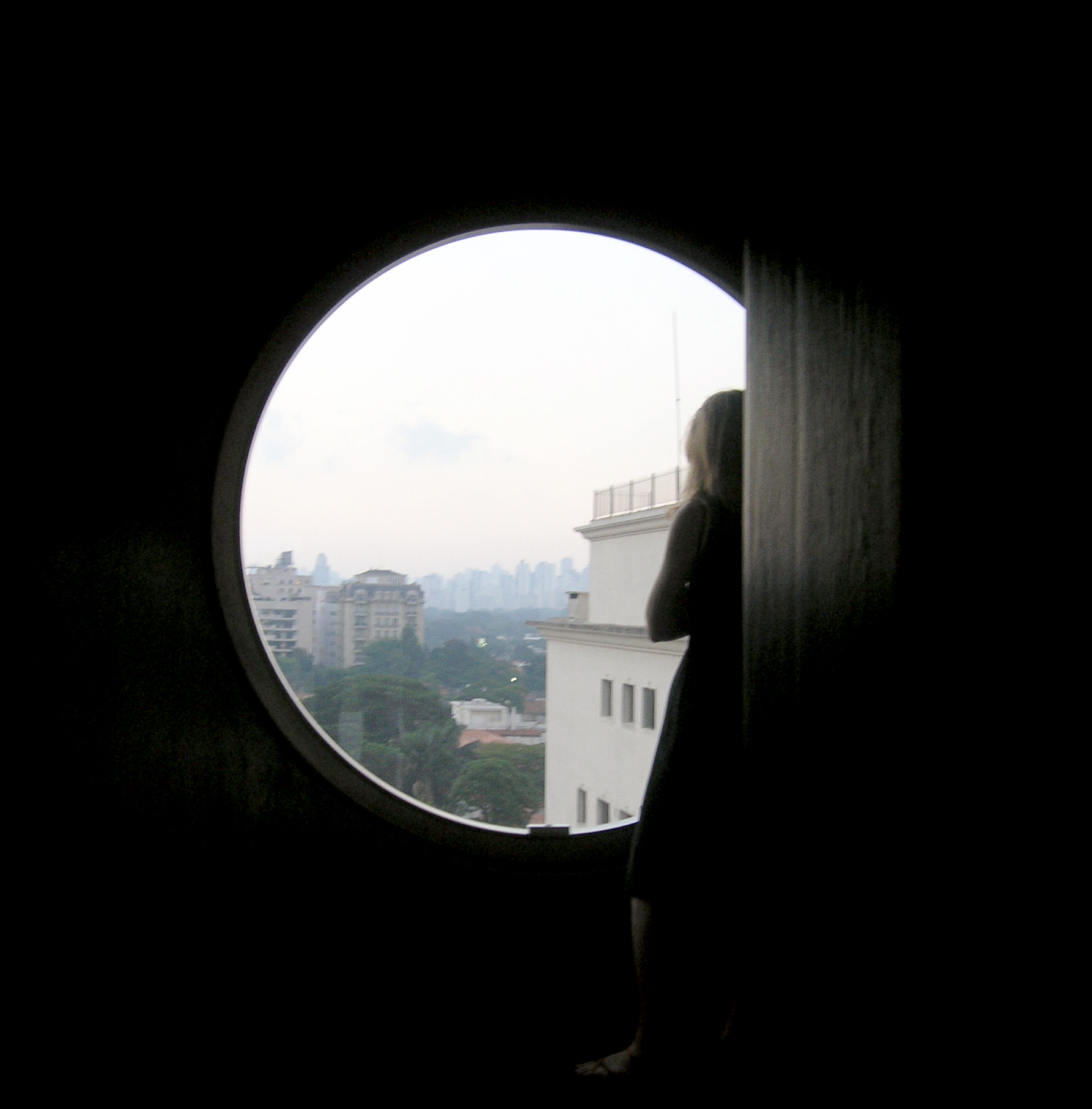
Window with view from the outside

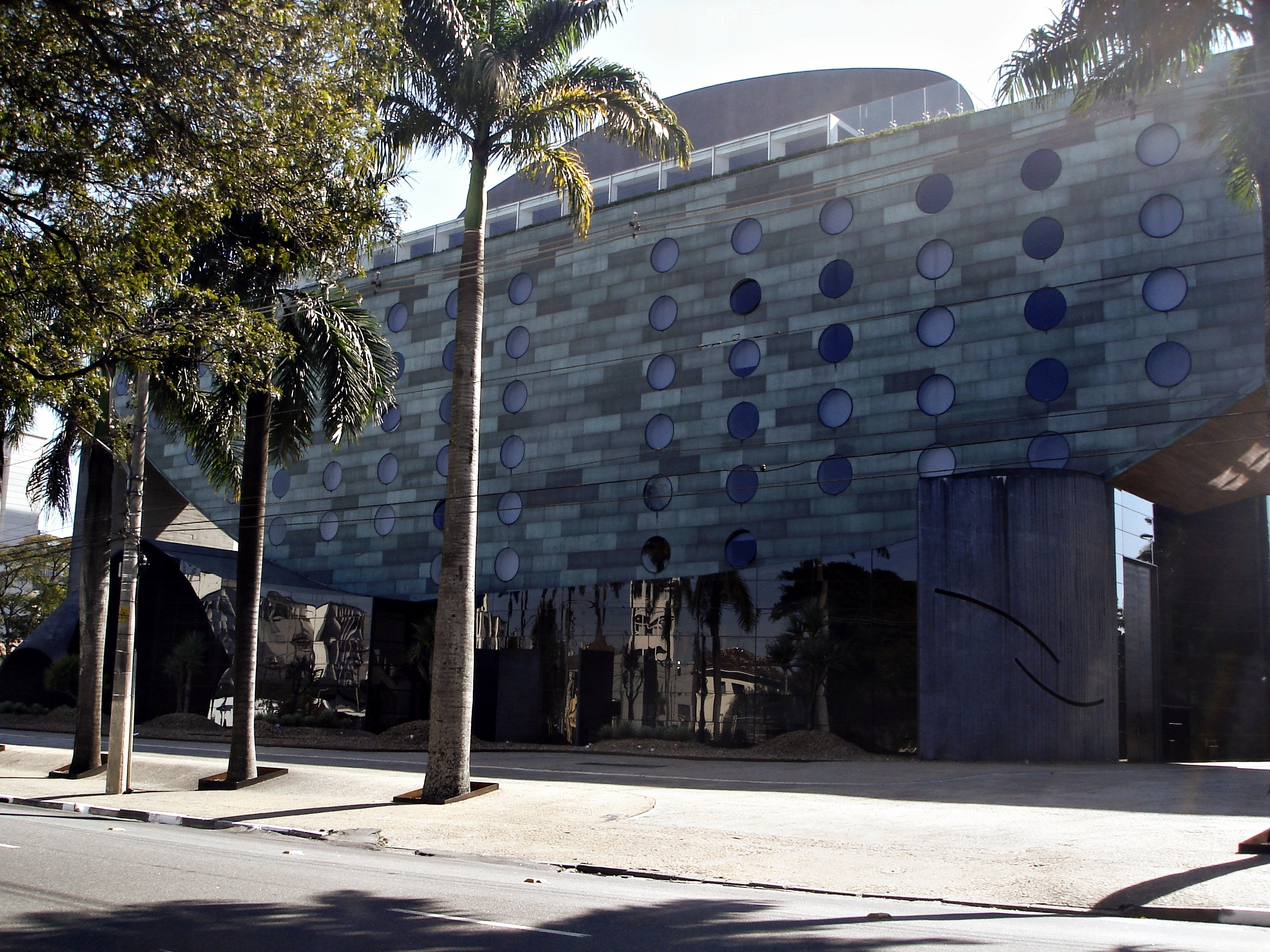
Hotel Unique

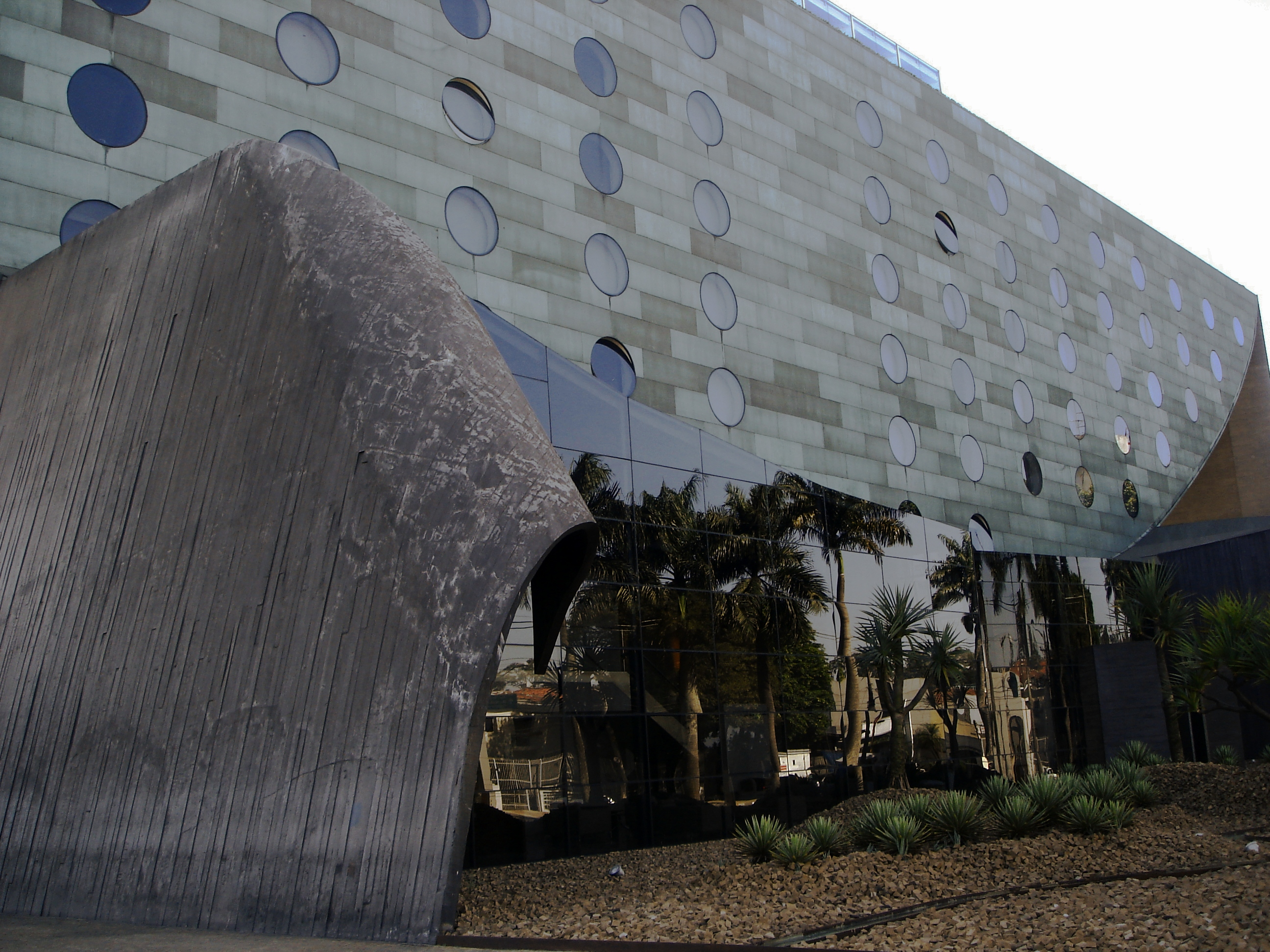
Hotel Unique facade detail

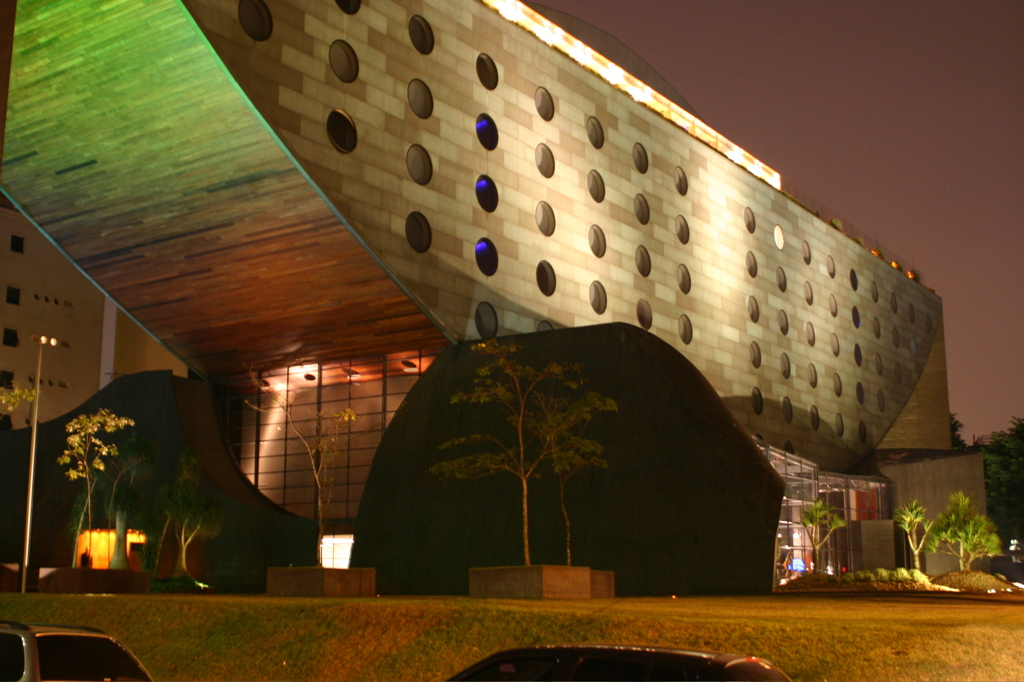
At night

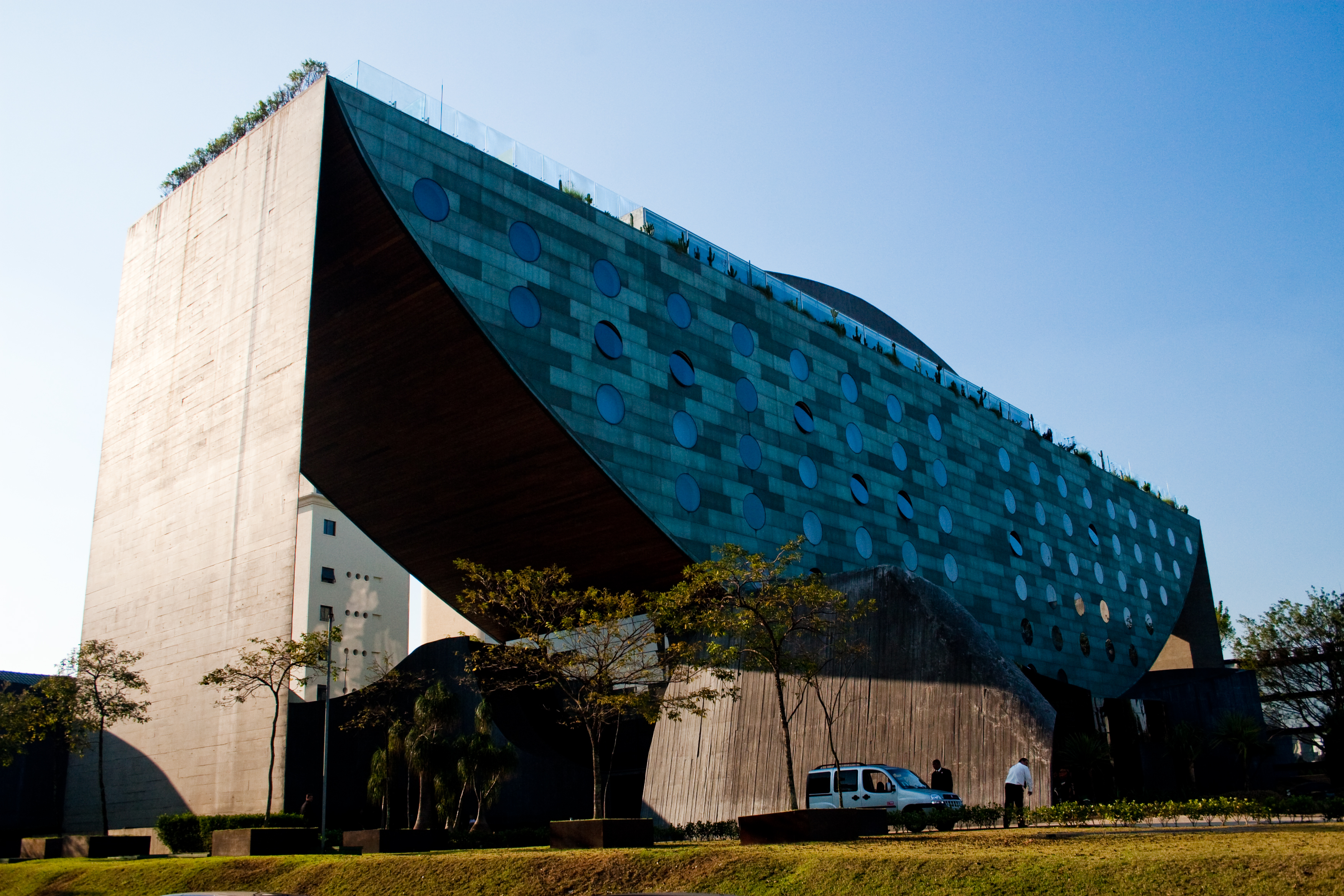
Hotel Unique in 2020
