= São Raimundo das Mangabeiras =

Coordinates: 7°01′S 45°29′W

- Municipality
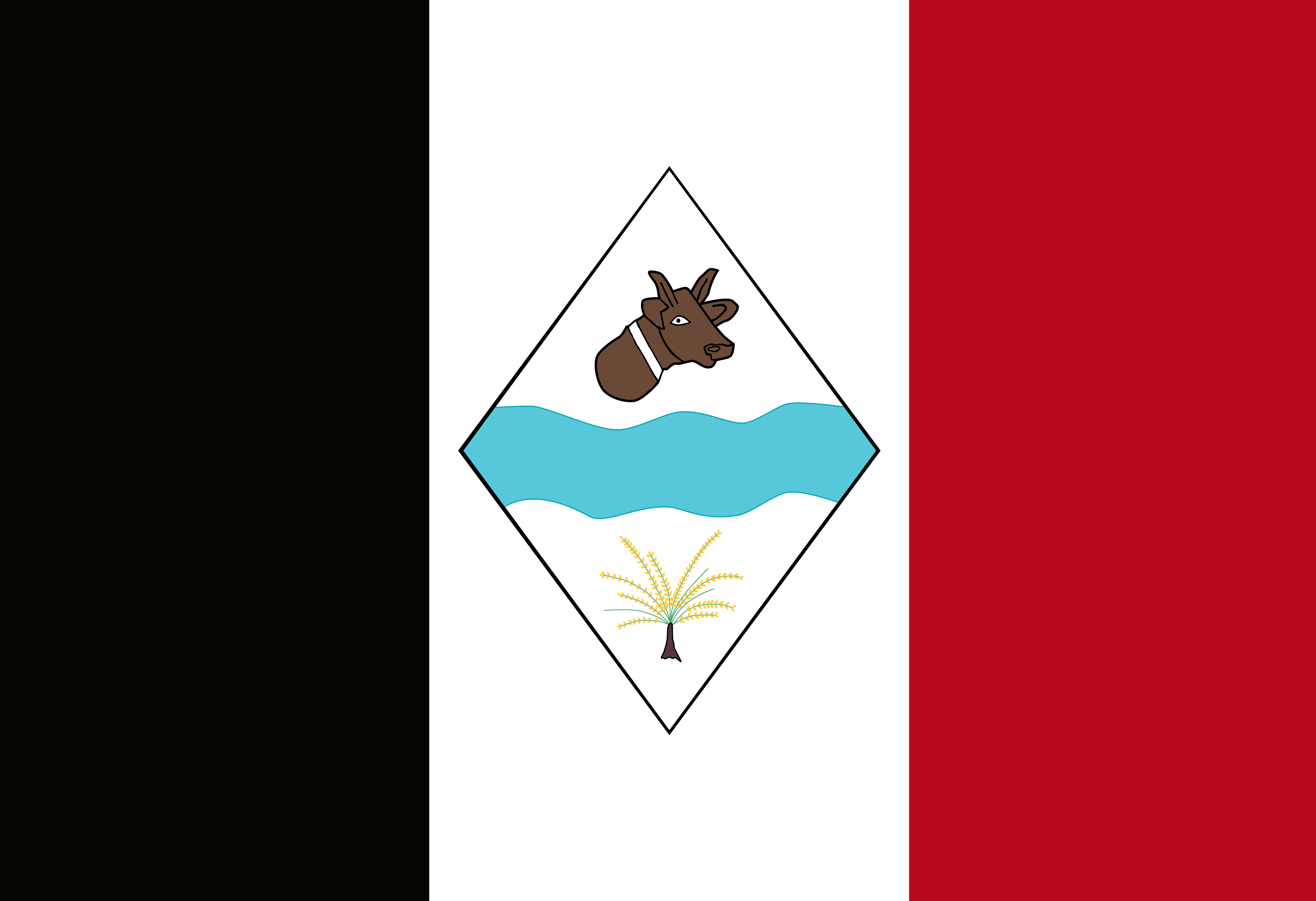
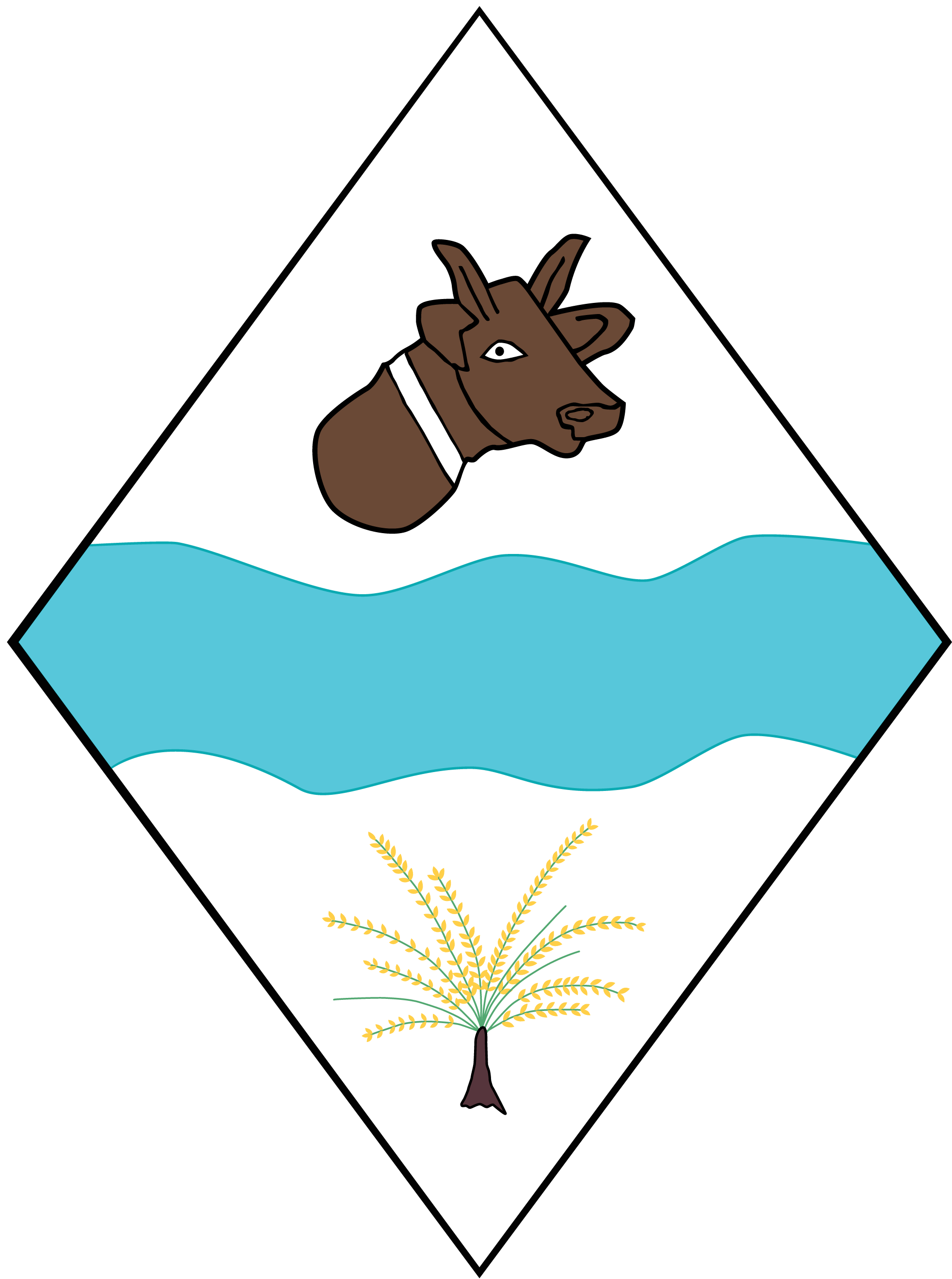
- Flag Coat of arms
- Interactive map of São Raimundo das Mangabeiras
- Country: Brazil
- Region: Nordeste
- State: Maranhão
- Mesoregion: Sul Maranhense
- Elevation: 738 ft (225 m)

Population (2020)
  - Total: 18,980
- Time zone: UTC−3 (BRT)

São Raimundo das Mangabeiras is a municipality in the state of Maranhão in the Northeast region of Brazil.

== History ==
The beginning of the settlement of São Raimundo das Mangabeiras dates back to 1890, but until 1895, only Faustino Trindade and Sabino Bezerra lived there, who were, as is known, its first inhabitants. Then, coming from Jurumenha - PI, Cipriano Taveira arrived with the help of the local population and neighboring villages in the construction of a church dedicated to Saint Raimundo Nonato, who is still the patron of the city. In 1917, Colonel Manoel José de Santana of New York and Major Rozendo Pires Ferreira of Loreto founded the Santana & Pires firm in São Raimundo das Mangabeiras, which is dedicated to the purchase of agricultural products and the sale of manufactured goods, becoming very well known in the south of Maranhão and north of Goiás.

In 1925, he was elevated to the rank of town and, as a result of efforts made by State Representative José Franklin da Serra Costa, gained political autonomy by virtue of Law No. 272, dated December 31, 1948. His first (named) mayor was Colonel Raimundo Nonato dos Santos, who was then elected Manoel Olívio de Carvalho.

== Education ==
The main schools are: Integrated Unit Mr. João Bosco (municipal), Teaching Center São Raimundo Nonato (state), Escola Moranguinho (private), Escola Infantil Raio de Sol (private), Integrated Unit Monsenhor Barros (state), INFO Professional Qualification, Unit Integrated Father Fábio Bertagnolli (Municipal), and Integrated Unit Mr. Rino Carlesi (Municipal), Integrated Unit Manoel da Silva Costa (Municipal).

=== Library ===
The city has a municipal public library: the Maria Salomé da Silva Moura Library.

=== IFMA ===
The agricultural school, which preceded the Institute, was requested by the federal deputy Cléber Verde of the PRB in 2007. With the approval of the law that transformed agrotechniques at the Federal Institutes, the municipality was contemplated for a campus. The IFMA - Federal Institute of Science and Technology of Maranhão - was instituted on the Campus of São Raimundo das Mangabeiras through the current President of the TCU, Minister Raimundo Carreiro, who was honored by the institution that gave his name to the institution's library. The IFMA was a regional lever in the parameters of education in secondary, technical, and higher education, until then lacking in the city. With this, the flow of immigrant students increased so much that, in 2016, approximately 50% of students were from surrounding cities.

== See also ==
- List of municipalities in Maranhão
