= Porto Franco =

Municipality in Maranhão, Brazil

- Municipality
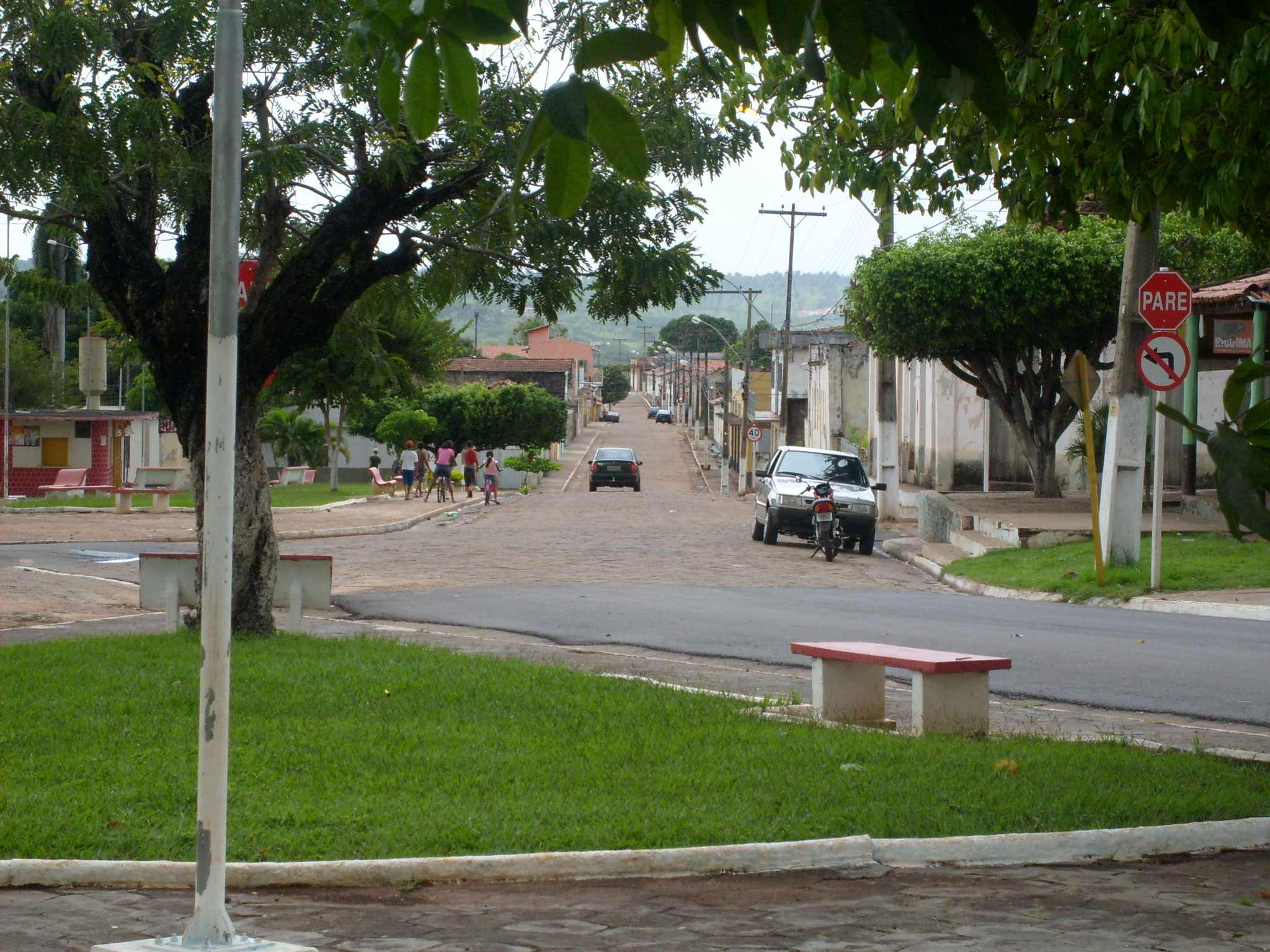

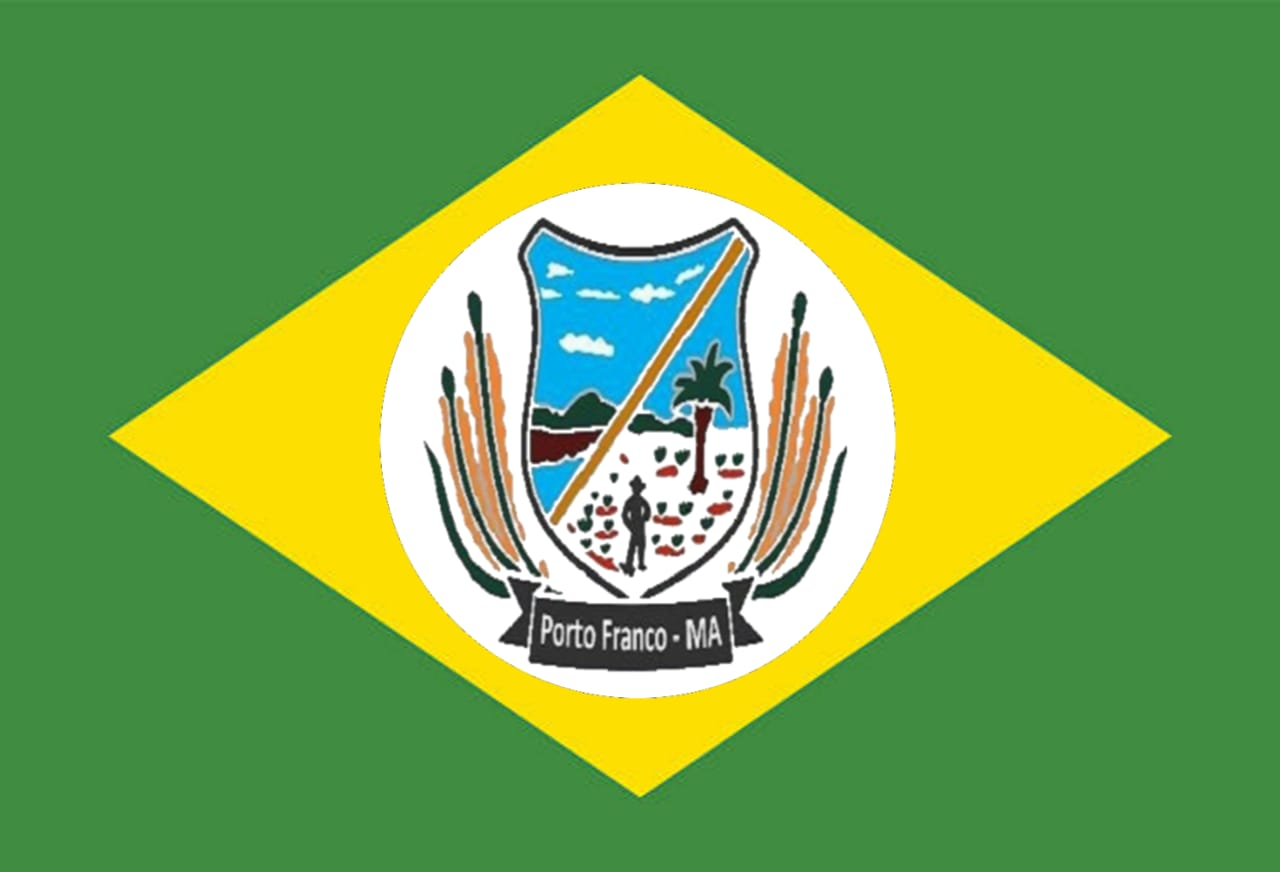
- Flag
- Interactive map of Porto Franco
- Coordinates: 6.33778°S 47.3989°W
- Country: Brazil
- Region: Northeast
- State: Maranhão
- Mesoregion: Sul Maranhense

Population (2020)
  - Total: 24,092
- Time zone: UTC−03:00 (BRT)

Porto Franco is a municipality in the state of Maranhão in the Northeast Region of Brazil. It is situated in front of Tocantinópolis, Tocantins, across the Tocantins River.

== See also ==
- List of municipalities in Maranhão
