= Araguanã =

Araguanã may refer to the following places in Brazil:

- Araguanã, Maranhão
- Araguanã, Tocantins
