= Araguanã, Maranhão =

Araguanã
- Municipality
- Flag

- Location in Brazil
- Coordinates: 2°57′10″S 45°39′54″W
- Country: Brazil
- Region: Nordeste
- State: Maranhão
- Mesoregion: Oeste Maranhense

Population (2020)
  - Total: 15,551
- Time zone: UTC−3 (BRT)

Araguanã is a municipality in the state of Maranhão in the Northeast region of Brazil. The population is 15,551.
