= List of Brazilian women writers =

This is a list of women writers who were born in Brazil or whose writings are closely associated with that country.

== A ==
- Ângela do Amaral Rangel (born 1725), journalist and poet
- Carine Adler (born 1948), screenwriter, film director
- Zuleika Alambert (1922–2012), feminist writer, politician
- Sarah Aldridge, pen name of Anyda Marchant (1911–2006), Brazilian-born American lesbian novelist, short story writer
- Eugênia Álvaro Moreyra (1898–1948), journalist, actress, theatre director
- Miriam Alves (born 1952), poet, short story writer
- Maria Adelaide Amaral (born 1942), playwright, screenwriter, novelist
- Narcisa Amalia (1856–1924), poet, journalist, women's rights activist
- Suzana Amaral (1932–2020), film director, screenwriter
- Leilah Assunção (born 1943), significant playwright, actress

== B ==
- Bruna Beber (born 1984), poet, writer
- Carol Bensimon (born 1982), short story writer, novelist
- Tati Bernardi (born 1979), short story writer, novelist, screenwriter, journalist
- Beatriz Francisca de Assis Brandão (1779–1868), poet, literary and theatrical translator
- Eliane Brum (born 1966), journalist, novelist, non-fiction writer

== C ==
- Astrid Cabral (born 1936), acclaimed poet, educator
- Alice Dayrell Caldeira Brant (1880–1970), young diarist
- Joyce Cavalccante (born 1963), novelist, poet, short story writer
- Kátya Chamma (born 1961), singer, poet
- Marina Colasanti (1937–2025), Italian-born Brazilian novelist, short story writer, poet, journalist, translator
- Cora Coralina (1889–1985), poet, children's writer
- Giselle Cossard (1923–2016) French Brazilian Anthropologist
- Ana Cristina Cesar (1952–1983), poet, translator
- Mariana Coelho (1857–1954), essayist, poet, educator, feminist
- Sonia Coutinho (1939–2013), journalist, short story writer, novelist
- Helena Parente Cunha (1929–2023), poet, novelist, short story writer, educator

== D ==
- Márcia Denser (1949–2024), magazine editor, columnist, short story writer
- Cristina de Queiroz (1944–2017), short story writer
- Maria José Dupré (1905–1984), popular novelist, author of Éramos Seis

== E ==
- Conceição Evaristo (born 1946), novelist, poet, short story writer

== F ==
- Lygia Fagundes Telles (1918–2022), novelist, short story writer
- Francisca Praguer Fróes (1872–1931), physician, feminist, non-fiction writer
- Nísia Floresta (1810–1885), early feminist writer
- Eva Furnari (born 1948), Italian-born children's writer

== G ==
- Zélia Gattai (1916–2008), photographer, memoirist, novelist, children's writer
- Ivone Gebara (born 1944), nun, feminist theologian, religious writer
- Luisa Geisler (born 1991), short story writer, novelist
- Ruth Guimarães (1920–2014), first Afro=Brazilian author to gain a national audience for novels, short stories, and poetry

== H ==
- Hilda Hilst (1930–2004), poet, playwright, novelist

== I ==
- Inez Haynes Irwin (1873–1970), Brazilian-born American novelist, short story writer, non-fiction writer, journalist, feminist

== J ==
- Noemi Jaffe (born 1962), novelist, educator
- Jaqueline Jesus (born 1978), psychologist, gay rights activist, non-fiction writer
- Carolina Maria de Jesus (1914–1977), diarist

== K ==
- Helena Kolody (1912–2004), poet

== L ==
- Ângela Lago (1945–2017), children's author
- Maria Lacerda de Moura (1887–1945), anarchist, journalist, non-fiction writer
- Danuza Leão (1933–2022), columnist, non-fiction writer
- Vange Leonel (1963–2014), singer, journalist, novelist, playwright, feminist
- Elsie Lessa (1912–2000), journalist, novelist
- Henriqueta Lisboa (1901–1985), widely translated poet, essayist, translator
- Clarice Lispector (1920–1977), acclaimed novelist, short story writer, journalist
- Elisa Lispector (1911–1989), novelist
- Júlia Lopes de Almeida (1862–1934), early Brazilian female novelist, short story writer, playwright, feminist
- Lya Luft (1938–2021), novelist, poet, translator

== M ==
- Ana Maria Machado (born 1941), children's writer
- Gilka Machado (1893–1980), poet
- Lúcia Machado de Almeida (1910–2005), poet, novelist, children's writer
- Maria Clara Machado (1921–2001), playwright, children's writer
- Tânia Martins (1957–2021), poet
- Olga Maynard (1913–1994), Brazilian-born prolific American non-fiction writer
- Cecília Meireles (1901–1964), acclaimed poet
- Ana Miranda (born 1951), novelist
- Ana Montenegro (1915–2006), poet, feminist writer, communist writer
- Rose Marie Muraro (1930–2014), sociologist, feminist writer

== N ==
- Adalgisa Nery (1905–1980), poet, short story writer, journalist, politician
- Lucila Nogueira (1950–2016), poet, essayist and short story writer

== O ==
- Marly de Oliveira (c.1938–2007), prolific poet, educator
- Orlandina de Oliveira (born 1943), Brazilian-born Mexican sociologist, academic, non-fiction writer

== P ==
- Elvira Pagã (1920–2003), film actress, writer, singer
- Alina Paim (1919–2011), novelist, children's literature, feminist writer, communist writer
- Pagu, pen name of Patrícia Rehder Galvão (1910–1962), poet, novelist, playwright, journalist, translator
- Paula Parisot (born 1978), writer
- Nélida Piñon (1937–2022), novelist, short story writer
- Adélia Prado (born 1935), poet, poetry translated into English

== Q ==
- Rachel de Queiroz (1910–2003), journalist, novelist, playwright, non-fiction writer

== R ==
- Regina Rheda (born 1957), Brazilian-born American novelist, short story writer, children's writer
- Esmeralda Ribeiro (born 1958), journalist, novelist
- Cassandra Rios (1932–2002), fiction, mystery, and specially lesbian erotica author.
- Maria Firmina dos Reis (1825–1917), novelist, poet

== S ==
- Carola Saavedra (born 1973), novelist
- Miêtta Santiago (1903–1995), poet, lawyer, feminist
- Yde Schloenbach Blumenschein (1882–1963), poet, memoirist
- Diná Silveira de Queirós (1911–1922), novelist, short story writer, playwright, essayist, children's writer
- Alessandra Silvestri-Levy (born 1972), art patron, non-fiction writer
- Angelina Soares (1910–1985), feminist writer
- Heloneida Studart (1932–2007), novelist, essayist, playwright, columnist, women's rights activist
- Auta de Souza (1876–1901), poet
- Syang, stage name of Simone Dreyer Peres (born 1968), musician, erotic writer

== T ==
- Malvina Tavares (1866–1939), anarchist, poet, educator
- Lygia Fagundes Telles (1918–2022), novelist, short story writer
- Lourdes Teodoro (born 1946), Afro-Brazilian poet and literary critic
- Marcia Theophilo (born 1941), poet, short story writer, essayist, writes in Portuguese, Italian and English
- Wal Torres (born 1950), sexologist, non-fiction writer

== V ==
- Luize Valente (born 1966), novelist, film maker, journalist
- Edla Van Steen (1936–2018), journalist, broadcaster, actress, short story writer, playwright
- Vira Vovk (1926–2022), Ukrainian-born Brazilian poet, novelist, playwright, translator, writing in Ukrainian, German and Portuguese

== See also ==
- List of women writers
- List of Brazilian writers
- List of Portuguese-language authors
