= 1825 =

1825 in various calendars
Gregorian calendar	1825; MDCCCXXV
Ab urbe condita	2578
Armenian calendar	1274; ԹՎ ՌՄՀԴ
Assyrian calendar	6575
Balinese saka calendar	1746–1747
Bengali calendar	1231–1232
Berber calendar	2775
British Regnal year	5 Geo. 4 – 6 Geo. 4
Buddhist calendar	2369
Burmese calendar	1187
Byzantine calendar	7333–7334
Chinese calendar	甲申年 (Wood Monkey); 4522 or 4315 — to — 乙酉年 (Wood Rooster); 4523 or 4316
Coptic calendar	1541–1542
Discordian calendar	2991
Ethiopian calendar	1817–1818
Hebrew calendar	5585–5586
- Hindu calendars
Vikram Samvat	1881–1882
Shaka Samvat	1746–1747
Kali Yuga	4925–4926
Holocene calendar	11825
Igbo calendar	825–826
Iranian calendar	1203–1204
Islamic calendar	1240–1241
Japanese calendar	Bunsei 8 (文政８年)
Javanese calendar	1752–1753
Julian calendar	Gregorian minus 12 days
Korean calendar	4158
Minguo calendar	87 before ROC 民前87年
Nanakshahi calendar	357
Thai solar calendar	2367–2368
Tibetan calendar	ཤིང་ཕོ་སྤྲེ་ལོ་ (male Wood-Monkey); 1951 or 1570 or 798 — to — ཤིང་མོ་བྱ་ལོ་ (female Wood-Bird); 1952 or 1571 or 799

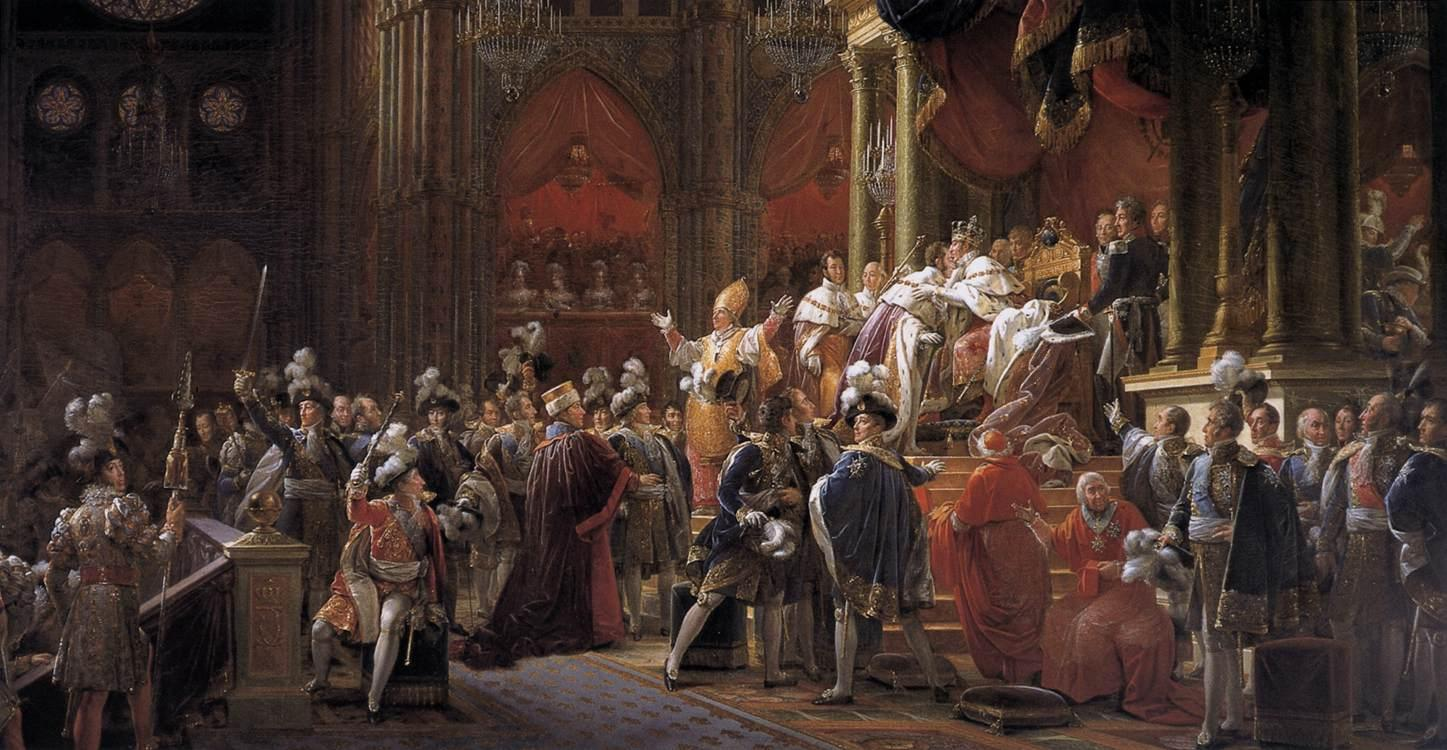
May 29: The last crowning of a French monarch takes place as the coronation of Charles X is held at Reims Cathedral.

1825 (MDCCCXXV) was a common year starting on Saturday of the Gregorian calendar and a common year starting on Thursday of the Julian calendar, the 1825th year of the Common Era (CE) and Anno Domini (AD) designations, the 825th year of the 2nd millennium, the 25th year of the 19th century, and the 6th year of the 1820s decade. As of the start of 1825, the Gregorian calendar was 12 days ahead of the Julian calendar, which remained in localized use until 1923.

== Events ==
=== January–March ===
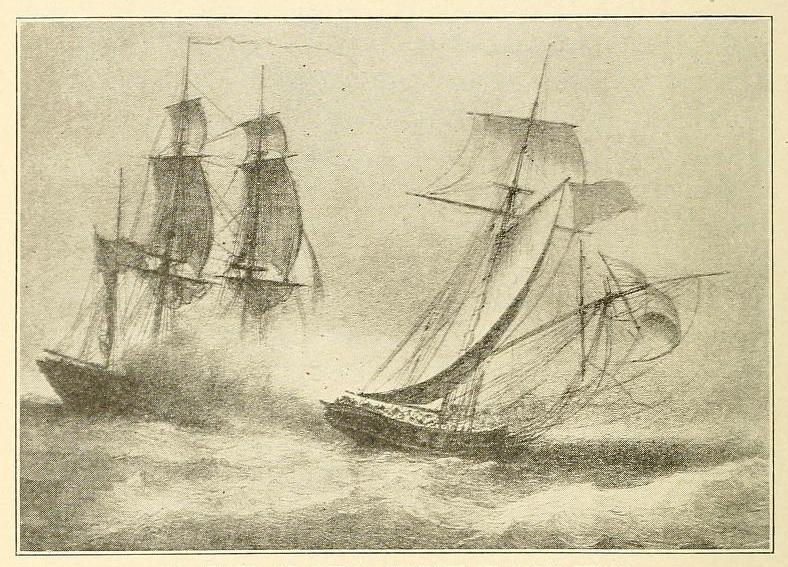
March 5: The capture of the pirate ship Anne takes place in the Caribbean Sea, effectively ending piracy there.

- January 4 – King Ferdinand I of the Two Sicilies dies in Naples and is succeeded by his son, Francis.
- February 3 – Vendsyssel-Thy, once part of the Jutland peninsula forming westernmost Denmark, becomes an island after a flood drowns its 1 kilometre (0.62 mi) wide isthmus.
- February 9 – After no presidential candidate receives a majority of United States Electoral College votes following the 1824 United States presidential election, the United States House of Representatives elects John Quincy Adams President of the United States in a contingent election.
- February 10 – Gideon Mantell names and describes the second known dinosaur Iguanodon.
- February 10 – Simón Bolívar gives up his title of dictator of Peru and takes the alternative title of El Libertador.
- February 12 – Second Treaty of Indian Springs: The Creek cede the last of their lands in Georgia to the United States government and migrate west.
- March 1 – The outbound British East Indiaman Kent is destroyed by fire in the Bay of Biscay with the loss of more than 80 lives, but over 550 are saved by passing ships.
- March 5 – Capture of the sloop Anne: Roberto Cofresí, one of the last successful pirates in the Caribbean, is defeated by an international naval force.
- March 17 – The Norfolk & Dedham Group is founded as The Norfolk Mutual Fire Insurance Company in the United States.

=== April–June ===
- April 17 – Charles X of France recognizes Haiti, 21 years after it expelled the French following the successful Haitian Revolution, and demands the payment of 150 million gold francs, 30 million of which Haiti must finance through France itself, as down payment.
- May 26 – Two Unitarian Christian bodies, the American Unitarian Association in the United States and the British and Foreign Unitarian Association in the United Kingdom are founded, coincidentally on the same date.
- May 29 – The Coronation of Charles X takes place at the historic site of Reims Cathedral, the last coronation of a French monarch.
- May – History of Brisbane: The Australian city of Brisbane is founded.
- June 2 – The United States Senate ratifies the treaties with the Great Osage and the Little Osage tribes.
- June 3 – The U.S. Senate ratifies the treaty with the Kansas tribe.
- June 9 – The U.S. Senate ratifies the treaty with the Poncas tribe.
- June 15 – A rebellion is started by 200 slaves in the Guamacaro region of Cuba, and is suppressed after 12 hours; in the ensuing months, most who were not killed in the battle will be hunted down and killed.

=== July–September ===
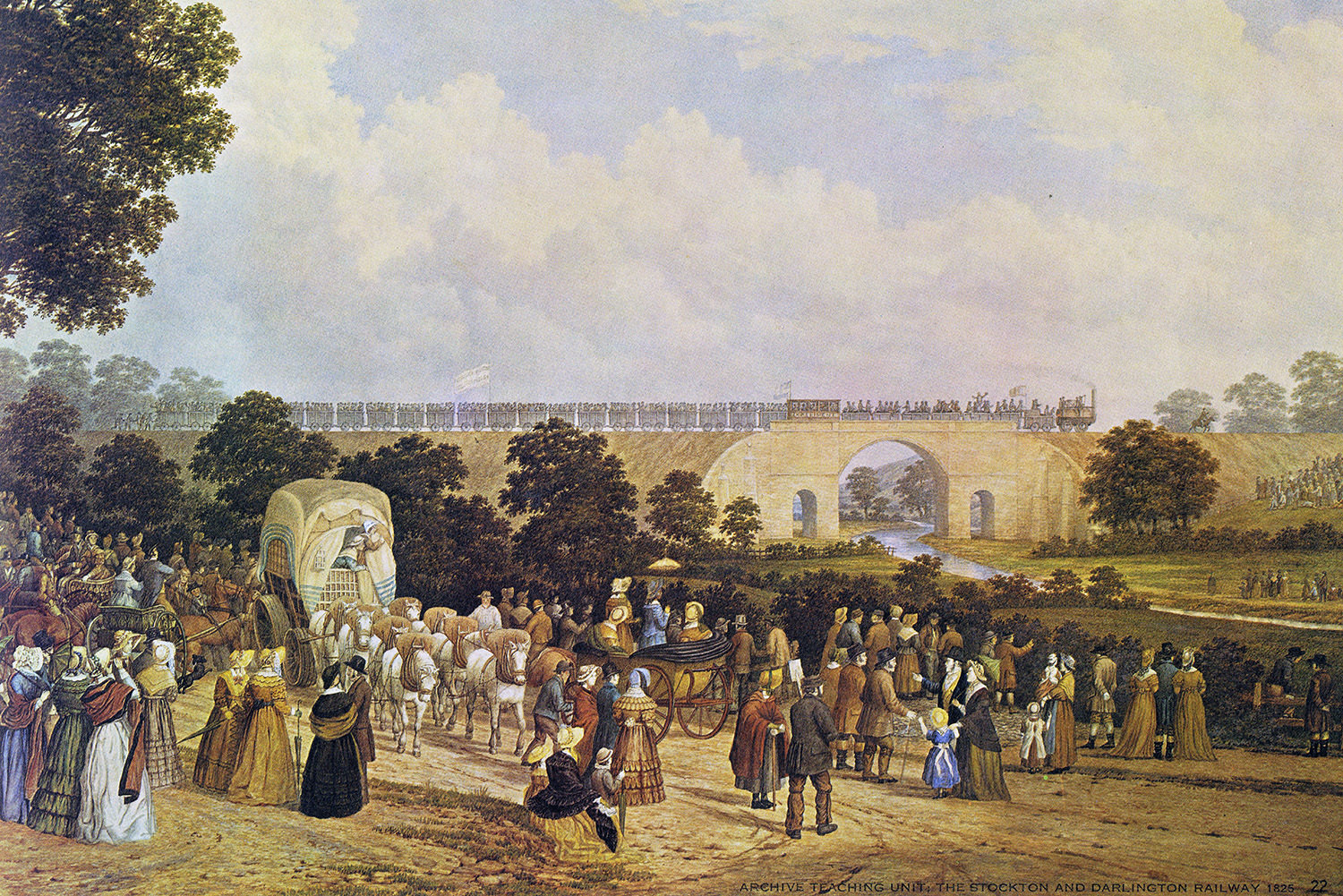
September 27: The Stockton and Darlington Railway opens in England.

- July 6
  - The Duke of Schleswig-Holstein-Sonderburg-Beck gains possession of Glücksburg and changes his title to Friedrich Wilhelm, Duke of Schleswig-Holstein-Sonderburg-Glücksburg. The line of Schleswig-Holstein-Sonderburg-Glücksburg later becomes the royal house of Greece, Denmark and Norway.
  - The U.S. Senate ratifies treaties with the Cheyenne tribe.
  - A new Combinations of Workmen Act in the United Kingdom makes trade unions legal according to narrowly defined principles.
- July 16 – The U.S. Senate ratifies treaties with the Hunkpapa tribe.
- July 18 – The U.S. Senate ratifies treaties with the Ricara tribes.
- July 20 – A skirmish takes place between Dutch-Yogyakartan forces and Javanese rebels, triggering the Java War.
- July 30
  - Malden Island (an uninhabited island in the central Pacific Ocean) is discovered by George Byron, 7th Baron Byron.
  - The U.S. Senate ratifies treaties with the Mandan, Belantae, Eloa and Minnetaree tribes.
- August 4 – The U.S. Senate ratifies treaties with the Ricara tribes.
- August 6 – Bolivia gains its independence from Spain as a republic, at the instigation of Simón Bolívar.
- August 11 – The U.S. Senate ratifies treaties with the Crow tribe.
- August 18 – Scottish adventurer Gregor MacGregor issues a £300,000 loan with 2.5% interest, through the London bank of Thomas Jenkins & Company, for the fictitious Central American republic of Poyais. His actions led to the Panic of 1825, the first modern stock market crash, in England.
- August 22 – The National Mexican Rite is created in Mexico City.
- August 25 – Uruguay is declared independent of the Empire of Brazil by the Thirty-Three Orientals, a militant revolutionary group led by Juan Antonio Lavalleja.
- September 25 – General Hendrik Merkus de Kock lifts the siege of Jogjakarta, the first major action of the Java War.
- September 26 – The U.S. Senate ratifies treaties with the Missouri and Ottoe tribes.
- September 27 – The world's first modern railway, the Stockton and Darlington Railway, opens in England.
- September 30 – The U.S. Senate ratifies treaties with the Pawnee tribe.
- September – The Lady Margaret Boat Club is founded by 12 members of St John's College, Cambridge.

=== October–December ===
December 14: The Decembrist revolt takes place in Russia.

- October 7 – The Miramichi Fire, a forest fire, breaks out in New Brunswick (Canada).
- October 21 – PS Comet II sinks off Gourock (Scotland) with the loss of 62 lives.
- October 26 – The Erie Canal opens, providing passage from Albany, New York to Buffalo and Lake Erie.
- November 7 – The U.S. Senate ratifies the treaty with the Shawnee tribe.
- November 15 – King Joao VI of Portugal promulgates a law recognizing his eldest son, Dom Pedro, as the Emperor of Brazil.
- October–December – Dispute between the United Provinces of the Río de la Plata and the Empire of Brazil over the Banda Oriental region leads to the Cisplatine War.
- December 1 (O.S.)/November 19 (N.S.) – Nicholas I of Russia succeeds his older brother Alexander I.
- December 9 – The British began the Siege of Bharatpur (1825–1826) in India.
- December 26 (O.S.)/December 14 (N.S.) – Some Imperial Russian Army officers stage the Decembrist revolt against Nicholas's accession in Saint Petersburg, but it is thoroughly suppressed by the government.

=== Date unknown ===
- Bishkek, Kyrgyzstan is founded as a mudfort on the Silk Road
- The Fort Vancouver trading post is established on the lower Columbia River by the Hudson's Bay Company.
- Hans Christian Ørsted reduces aluminium chloride to produce metallic aluminium.
- Minh Mạng outlaws the teaching of Christianity in Vietnam.
- The first horse-drawn omnibuses established in London.
- The United States Postal Service starts a dead letter office.
- London becomes the largest city in the world, taking the lead from Beijing.

== Births ==
=== January–June ===
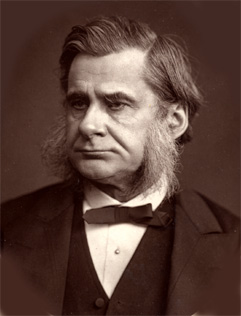
Thomas Henry Huxley

- January 11 – Clement V. Rogers, Cherokee politician, father of Will Rogers (d. 1911)
- January 25 – George Pickett, American Confederate general (d. 1876)
- January 31 – Miska Magyarics, Slovene poet in Hungary (d. 1883)
- February 8 – Henri Giffard, French engineer, pioneer in airship technology (d. 1882)
- February 10 – Geoffrey Hornby, British admiral (d. 1895)
- March 13 – Hans Gude, Norwegian romanticist landscape painter (d. 1903)
- March 16 – Camilo Castelo Branco, Portuguese writer (d. 1890)
- March 21 – Alexander Mozhaysky, Russian aeronautical pioneer (d. 1890)
- March 22 – Jane Sym, second wife of Canada's second prime minister (d. 1893)
- April 11 – Ferdinand Lassalle, Prussian-German philosopher, socialist and politician (d. 1864)
- April 24 – Robert Michael Ballantyne, Scottish novelist (d. 1894)
- May 4 – Thomas Henry Huxley, English biologist (d. 1895)
- May 8 – George Bruce Malleson, English officer, author (d. 1898)
- May 9 – George Davidson, English-born geodesist, astronomer, geographer, surveyor, and engineer in the United States (d. 1911)
- June 3 – Sophie Sager, Swedish women's rights activist (d. 1902)

=== July–December ===
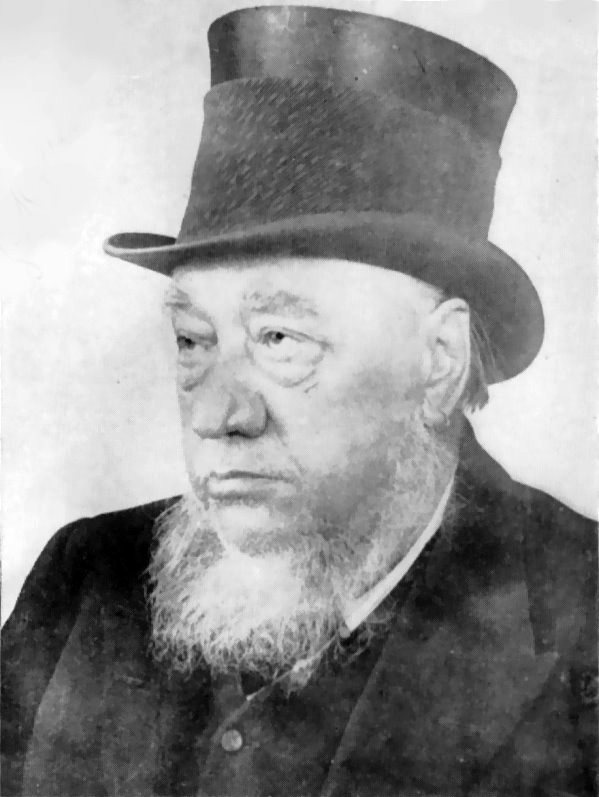
Paul Kruger

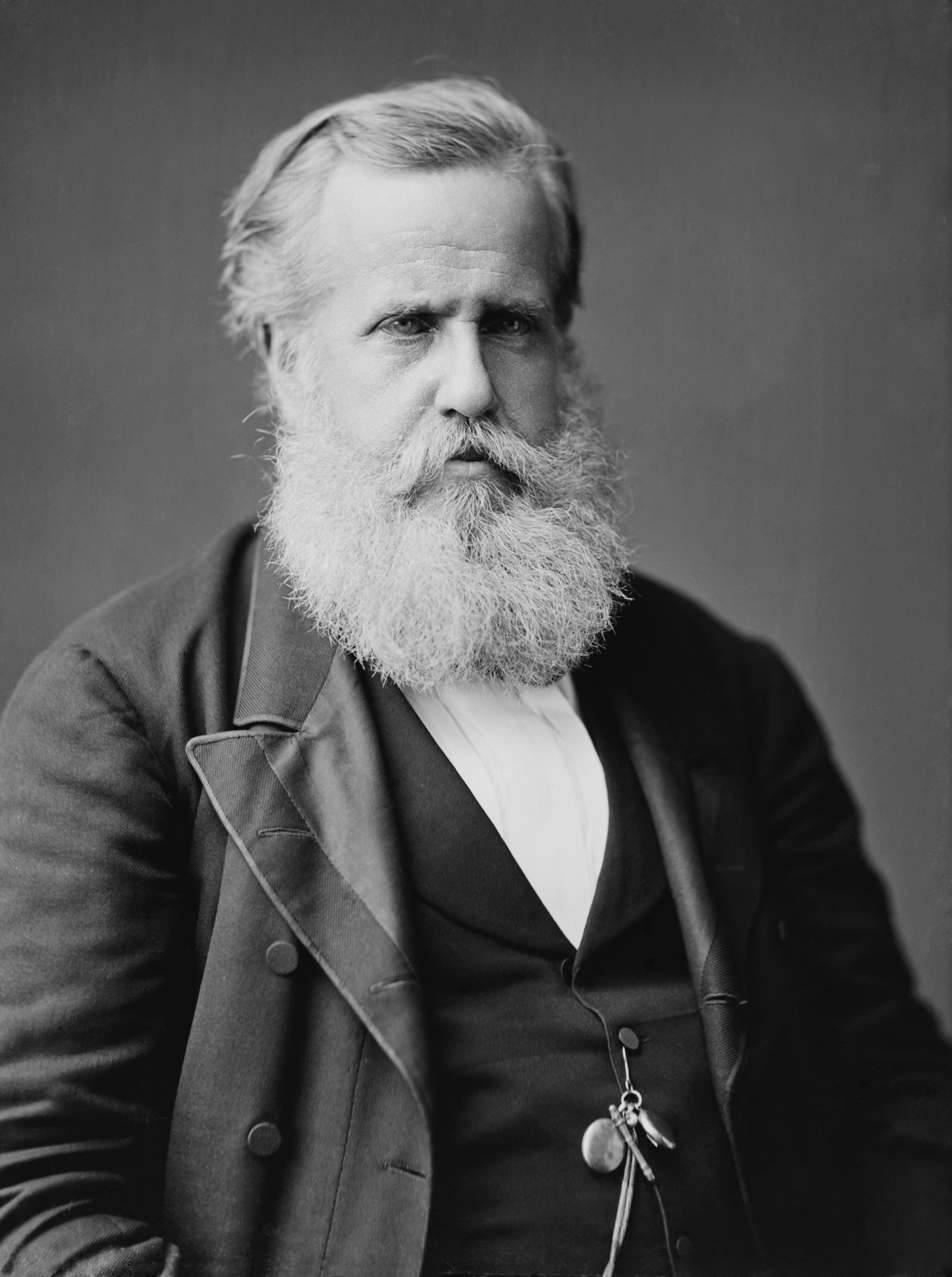
Pedro II of Brazil

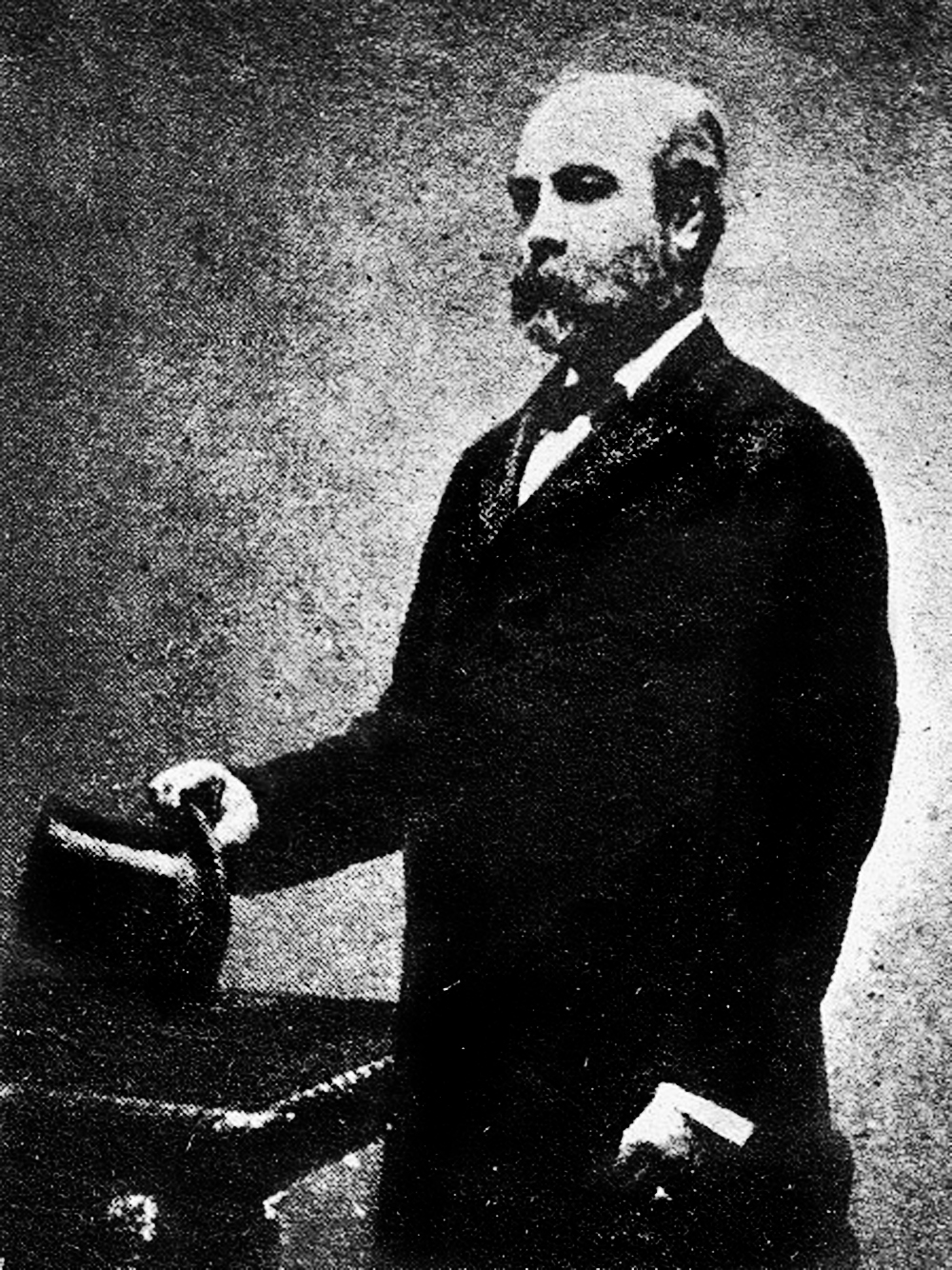
Mariano Prado

- July 2 – Émile Ollivier, French statesman (d. 1913)
- July 19 – George H. Pendleton, American politician (d. 1889)
- July 21 – Práxedes Mateo Sagasta, Spanish politician, eight-time prime minister of Spain (d. 1903)
- August 31 – Robert Dunsmuir, Scottish industrialist, politician (d. 1889)
- September 4 – Dadabhai Naoroji, Indian politician (d. 1917)
- September 11 – Eduard Hanslick, Austrian music critic (d. 1904)
- September 13 – William Henry Rinehart, American sculptor (d. 1874)
- September 17 – Lucius Quintus Cincinnatus Lamar II, American politician, Associate Justice of the Supreme Court of the United States (d. 1893)
- September 25 – Joachim Heer, Swiss politician (d. 1879)
- October 8 – Paschal Beverly Randolph, American occultist (d. 1875)
- October 10 – Paul Kruger, Boer resistance leader (d. 1904)
- October 11 – Maria Firmina dos Reis, Brazilian abolitionist and author (d. 1917)
- October 13 – Charles Frederick Worth, English-born fashion designer, father of haute couture (d. 1895)
- October 25
  - Francis March, American comparative linguist (d. 1911)
  - Johann Strauss, Junior, Austrian composer (d. 1899)
- November 9 – A. P. Hill, American Confederate general (d. 1865)
- November 29 – Jean-Martin Charcot, French physician, neurologist (d. 1893)
- November 30 – William-Adolphe Bouguereau, French painter and educator (d. 1905)
- December 2 – Pedro II, Emperor of Brazil (d. 1891)
- December 18 – Mariano Ignacio Prado, Peruvian general and statesman, twice President of Peru (d. 1901)
- December 30 – Samuel Newitt Wood, American politician (d. 1891)
- December 31 – Elizabeth Martha Olmsted, American poet (d. 1910)

=== Date unknown ===
- Sher Ali Khan, ruler of Afghanistan (d. 1879)
- Juan Williams Rebolledo, Chilean admiral and politician (d. 1910)

== Deaths ==
=== January–June ===
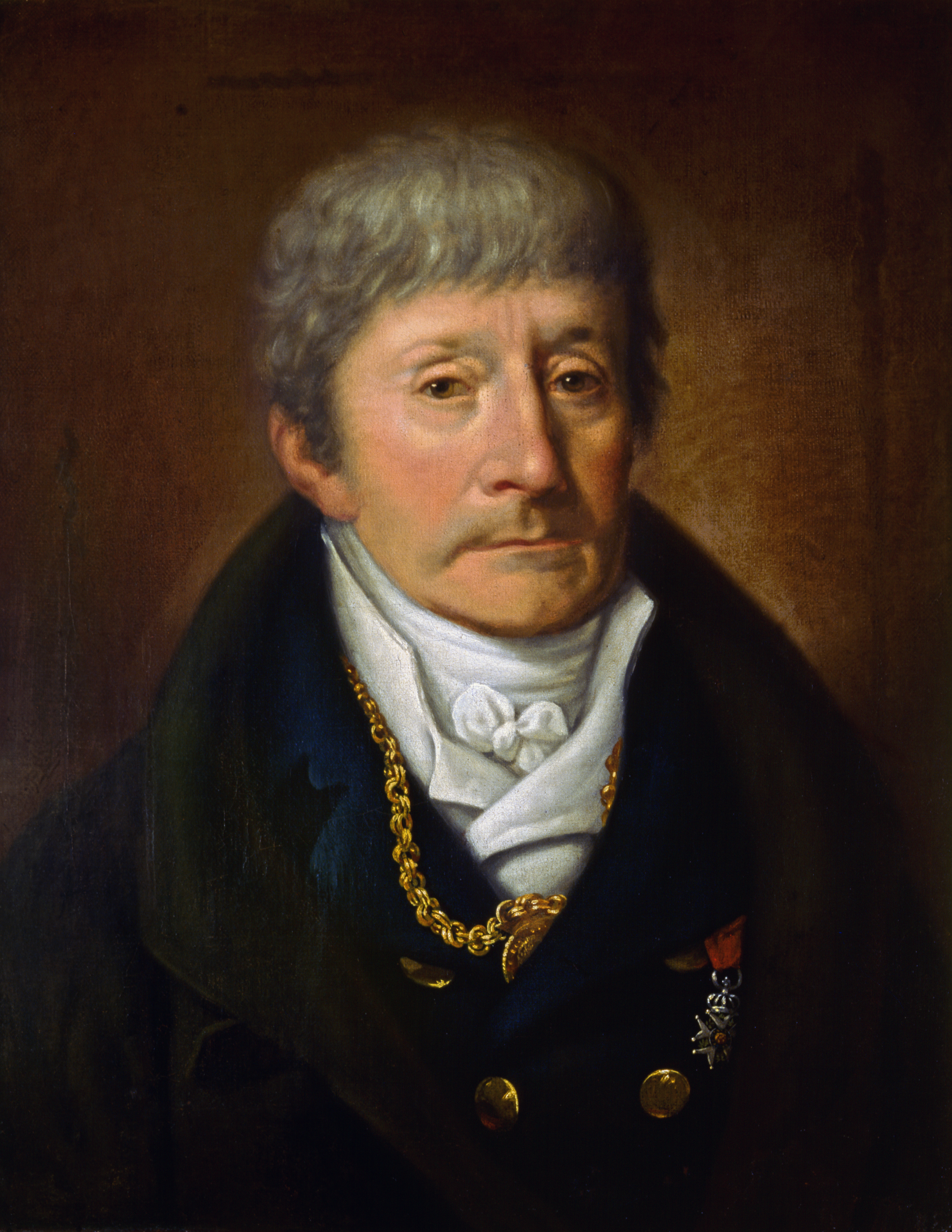
Antonio Salieri

Eleanor Anne Porden

- January 4 – Ferdinand I of the Two Sicilies (b. 1751)
- January 8 – Eli Whitney, American inventor (b. 1765)
- February 22 – Eleanor Anne Porden, English poet (b. 1795)
- February 24 – Thomas Bowdler, English physician (b. 1754)
- March 1
  - John Brooks (governor), Massachusetts doctor, military officer, governor (b. 1752)
  - John Haggin, Indian fighter, one of the earliest settlers of Kentucky (b. 1753)
- March 4 – Hercules Mulligan, tailor, spy during the American Revolutionary War (b. 1740)
- March 6 – Samuel Parr, English schoolmaster (b. 1747)
- March 25 – Antoine Fabre d'Olivet, French writer (b. 1767)
- March 27 – Alexander Lindsay, 6th Earl of Balcarres, British Army general (b. 1752)
- April 23 – Friedrich Müller, German painter, narrator, lyricist and dramatist (b. 1749)
- April 17 – Henry Fuseli, Swiss painter and writer (b. 1741)
- May 7 – Antonio Salieri, Italian composer (b. 1750)
- May 13 – Charles Whitworth, 1st Earl Whitworth, British diplomat (b. 1752)
- May 19 – Claude Henri de Rouvroy, comte de Saint-Simon, French politician (b. 1760)
- May 22 – Laskarina Bouboulina, Greek independence fighter, heroine (shot) (b. 1771)
- May 23 – Ras Gugsa of Yejju, Regent of the Emperor of Ethiopia
- June 11 – Daniel D. Tompkins, 6th Vice President of the United States (b. 1774)
- June 14 – Pierre Charles L'Enfant, French architect (b. 1754)
- June 27 – Domenico Vantini, Italian painter

=== July–December ===
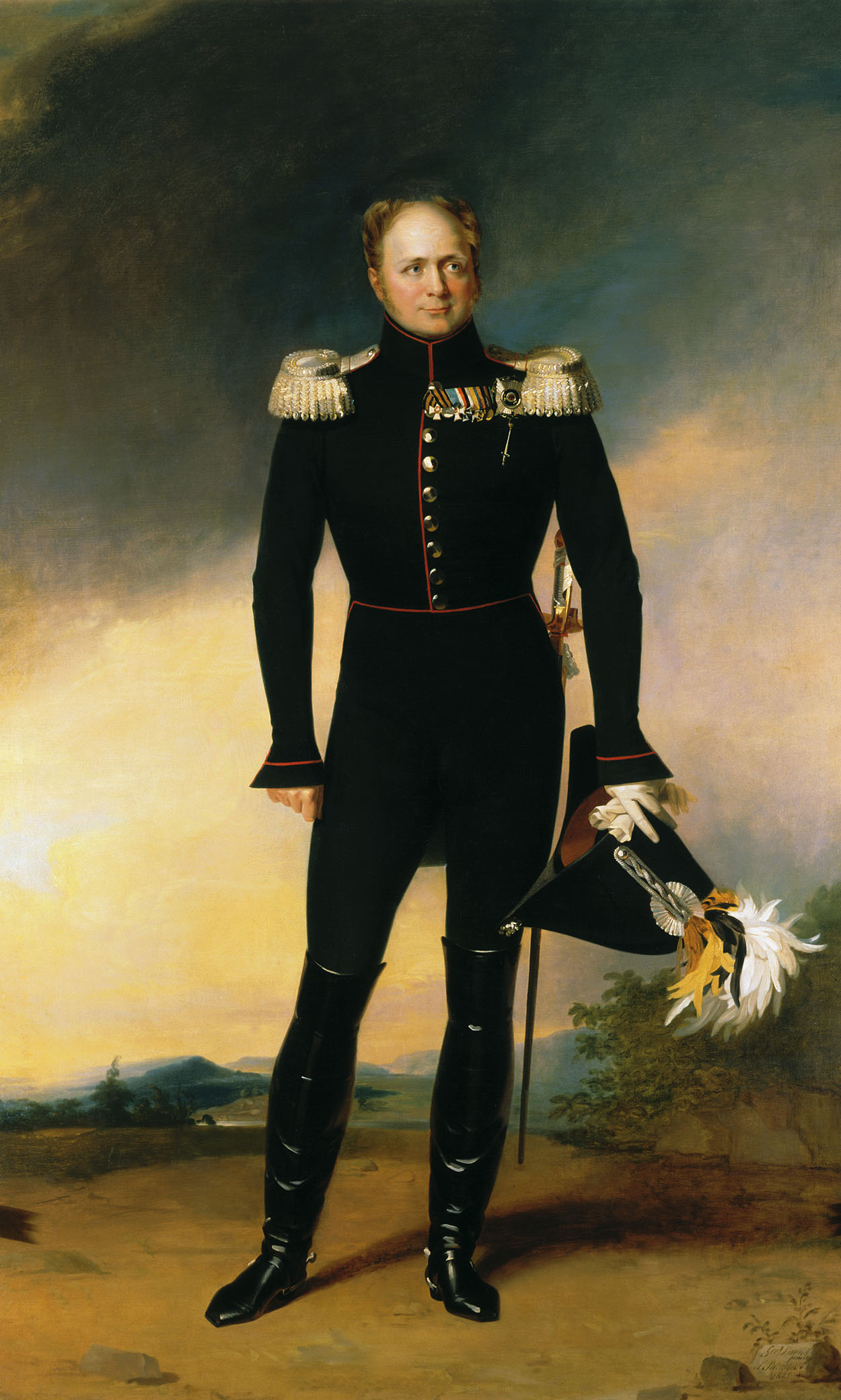
Alexander I of Russia

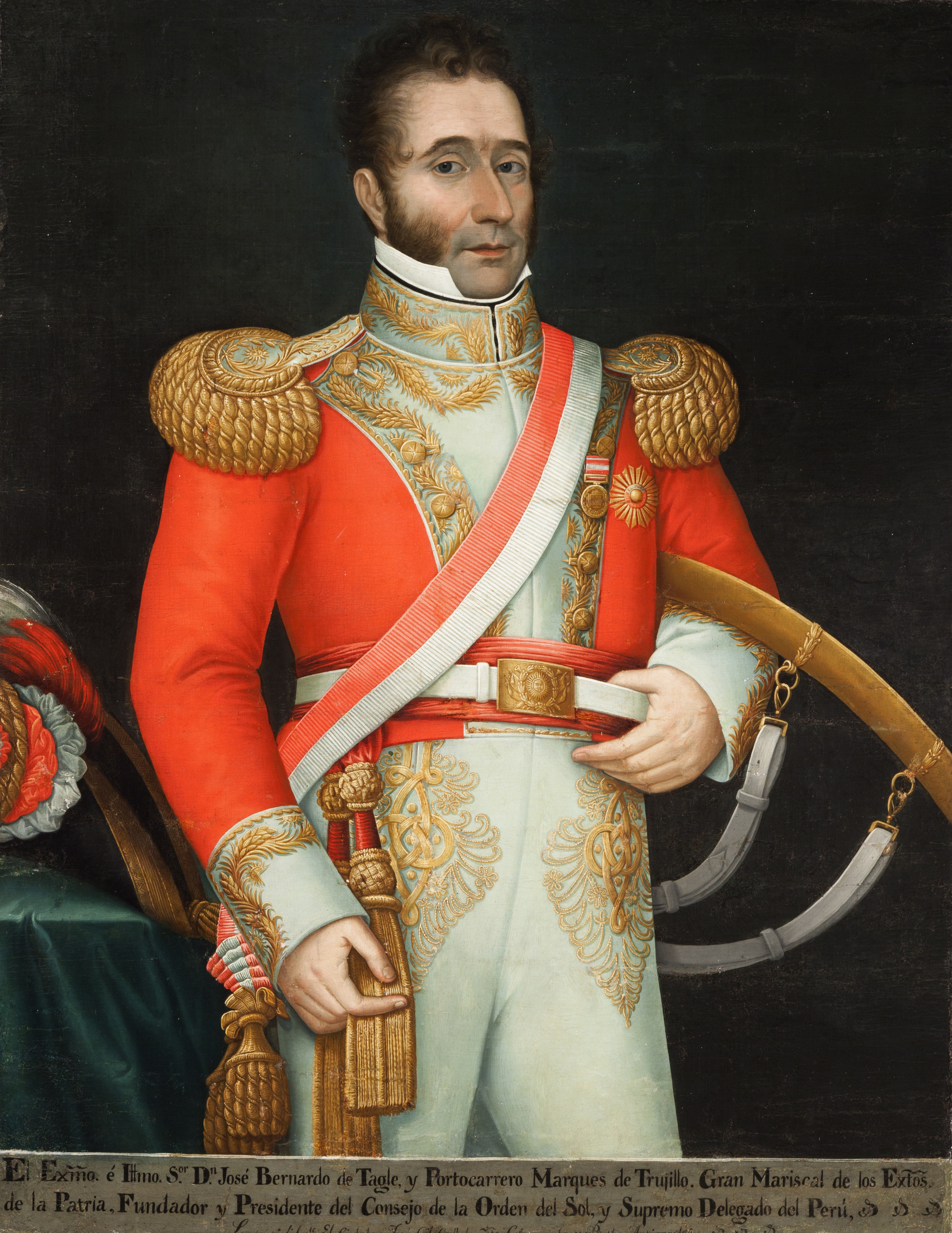
José Bernardo de Tagle

- July 12 – Dorothea von Rodde-Schlözer, German scholar (b. 1770)
- July 15 – David Ochterlony, Massachusetts-born general with the East India Company (b. 1758)
- August 3 – Ambrogio Minoja, Italian composer, professor of music (b. 1752)
- August 16 – Charles Cotesworth Pinckney, American politician, soldier (b. 1746)
- August 20 – William Waldegrave, 1st Baron Radstock, British admiral, Governor of Newfoundland (b. 1753)
- September 4 – Frederick Howard, 5th Earl of Carlisle (b. 1748)
- September 26 – José Bernardo de Tagle y Portocarrero, Marquis of Torre Tagle, Peruvian soldier and politician, 2nd President of Peru (b. 1779)
- September 29 – Daniel Shays, American Revolutionary War captain, also the leader of the Shays's Rebellion (b. 1747)
- October 6 – Bernard Germain de Lacépède, French naturalist (b. 1756)
- October 9 – Lucia Pytter, Norwegian philanthropist (b. 1762)
- October 13 – King Maximilian I Joseph of Bavaria (b. 1756)
- November 7 – Charlotte Dacre, English Gothic novelist (b. c. 1772)
- November 14 – Jean Paul, German writer (b. 1763)
- December 1 – Emperor Alexander I of Russia (November 19 on the Russian calendar) b. 1777)
- December 28 – James Wilkinson, American soldier, statesman (b. 1757)
- December 29 – Jacques-Louis David, French painter (b. 1748)

=== Dates unknown ===
- Armand-Marie-Jacques de Chastenet, Marquis of Puységur, French mesmerist (b. 1751)
- Huang Peilie, Chinese bibliophile (b. 1763)
- Maria Angela Ardinghelli, Italian scientific translator (b. 1730)
