= Graça Paz =

Brazilian politician

Maria da Graça Fonseca Paz, best known as Graça Paz (Guimarães, May 2, 1953) is a lawyer, administrator, and politician in Brazil. She is married to engineer Clodomir Paz and the mother of state deputy Guilherme Paz.

== Political career ==
Graça Paz entered the political scene in 2002 when she ran for state deputy under the Democratic Labor Party (PDT). She was elected and served three consecutive terms. Before her 2002 election, she worked for her husband, former state deputy Clodomir Paz.

In the 2018 election, she ran as vice-governor beside Roberto Rocha of the Brazilian Social Democratic Party (PSDB) and was unsuccessful.
