= Rodrigo de Haro =

Rodrigo de Haro (May 6, 1939, Paris – July 1, 2021, Florianópolis) was a Brazilian poet, painter, draughtsman, engraver, writer, mosaic artist.

He was the son of the classical painter Martinho de Haro. He was born in Paris and came to Brazil in 1939.

Rodrigo de Haro obtained a degree in Architecture and Urbanism from UFSC, a PhD from the University of the Basque Country and a post-doctorate in Public Art from UFF-RJ.

He also taught painting at the Oficinas de Arte do Museu de Arte de Santa Catarina.

He was a member of the Academia Catarinense de Letras. One of his works decorates the walls and entrance of the rectorate of the Federal University of Santa Catarina. His works can also be seen in the Church of Santa Catarina de Alexandria, dedicated to Saint Catherine of Alexandria, the patroness of Florianópolis, and in a mural at the municipal school Dr. Paulo Fontes in the Santo Antônio de Lisboa community in Florianópolis.

He worked mostly in Florianópolis and São Paulo. In 1958, he held his first solo exhibition in Florianópolis.

In poetry, he joined the surrealist movement since 1960 and had his poems published in books in Brazil and in anthologies in Spain and the United States. His work was associated with surrealism and the group of poets that emerged in the early 1960s in São Paulo, including Roberto Piva, Claudio Willer, Carlos Felipe Moisés, and Antonio Fernando de Franceschi, among others.

In 1987, he worked on the decoration of the Florianópolis Municipal Theatre with 80 Mandala panels.

He died on July 1, 2021, in Florianópolis at the age of 82.

== Publications ==
- "Trinta poemas" – São Paulo: Author's edition, 1961
- "Taça estendida," 1968
- "Pedra elegíaca" – Porto Alegre: Edições Flama, 1971
- "Amigo da labareda" – Poesia, São Paulo: Massao Ohno, 1991
- "Mistério de Santa Catarina" – Florianópolis: Athanor, 1992
- "Porta" – Florianópolis: Athanor, 1992
- "Naufrágios" – Florianópolis: Paralelo 27, 1993
- "Caliban" – Florianópolis: Athanor, 1995
- "Livro da borboleta verde" – Florianópolis: Fenasoft, 1998
- "Andanças de Antônio" – Florianópolis: Insular, 2005
- "Ofícios secretos. Poesia hermética" – Florianópolis: Insular, 2011
