= Blumenschein =

Blumenschein is a surname. Notable persons with that surname include:

- Ernest L. Blumenschein (1874–1960), American artist
  - Ernest L. Blumenschein House, museum and art gallery in New Mexico
- Tabea Blumenschein (born 1952), German actress
- Yde Schloenbach Blumenschein (1882–1963), Brazilian poet and chronicler
