= Ubiratan =

Ubiratan is a masculine given name. Notable people with the name include:

- Ubiratan D'Ambrosio, Brazilian historian of mathematics
- Ubiratan Castro, Brazilian historian and writer
- Ubiratan Gonçalves, Brazilian herpetologist
- Ubiratan Guimarães, Brazilian military policeman and politician
- Ubiratan Pereira Maciel (1944–2002), Brazilian basketball player

== See also ==
- Elivelton Ubiratan Oliveira de Lima (born 1995), Brazilian football defender
- Ubiratan Esporte Clube, Brazilian football club
- Ubiratã, municipality in Paraná, Brazil
