= Quilombhoje =

Quilombhoje is a literary group of Afro-Brazilian writers formed in the early 1980s. The word "Quilombhoje" is a portmanteau of the Portuguese words quilombo (a settlement of runaway slaves) and hoje (today). It was part of a greater black identity movement internationally ubiquitous in the 20th century. Since its founding, Quilombhoje has hosted many literary and cultural activities which promote awareness of, and pride in, Afro-Brazilian heritage.

== History ==
Original members of Quilombhoje, Paulo Colina, Oswaldo Camargo, Aberlado Rodrigues, and Cuti began informally meeting in bars from 1980 to 1982. They sought to promote the idea of a literary group that emphasized Afro-Brazilian literature and culture. Inspired by Cadernos Negros, Quilombhoje's purpose was to combine the literary, political, and cultural aspects of the Movimento Negro (Black Movement) in Brazil.

Eventually, other authors joined the group, including Miriam Alves and Kibuko. Many of the original authors were not pleased with the new members. Colina, Camargo, and Rodrigues disliked Kibuko's unorthodox writing style and considered it unacceptable in Afro-Brazilian literature. Similarly, Miriam Alves also produced much dissent among Quilombhoje participants. A poet and social worker by trade, Alves was the first woman to join the group. Consequentially, the poet's feminist ideas clashed with the outspoken machismo of male writers and all of the original authors left the group except Cuti. When asked in an interview why he stayed amidst contention, he explained that the continuous debate and criticism of texts would contribute to the improvement of their literary quality.

As Quilombhoje expanded its literary activities, it developed into a more formal, systemic organization. The group began meeting at Cuti's house instead of bars and began sponsoring other literary and cultural events including continued publications of Cadernos Negros, círculos de poemas, Livros do Autor, and other essays and plays.

== Afro-Brazilian women writers ==
Quilombhoje offered a new platform for Afro-Brazilian women writers to express their views. Miriam Alves, Esmeralda Ribeiro, and Sônia Fátima da Conceição were the only women members of the group. Although these women joined Quilombhoje in its early stages, Quilombhoje's cornerstone publication, Cadernos Negros, was dominated by male writings until 1988. It was not until 1992 that women predominated the journal. Conceição, Alves, and Ribeiro published frequently in Cadernos Negros participating in eleven, sixteen, and twenty-three issues respectively. Black women in Quilombhoje sought to empower Afro-Brazilian women through literary production and political discourse by celebrating womanhood, black female authorship, and black woman's identity. In 1994, Miriam Alves was removed from Quilombhoje for failure to comply with the stricter meeting guidelines that had evolved since Quilombhoje's founding. After the departure of Alves, women's influence in Quilombhoje diminished. Conceição also left Quilombhoje in 1999 due to "work-related pressures." Ribeiro has been heavily involved in all stages of the production of Cadernos Negros including its ideological agenda, political and cultural promotion, and financial transactions since 1997. Another woman writer that wrote for Cadernos Negros was Conceição Evaristo, whose poemes were published on it between 1990 and 2011.

== Cadernos Negros ==
The Cadernos Negros are a big part of what led to the foundation of the Quilombhoje. Unlike many other literary productions, Cadernos Negros was released in 1978 prior to the establishment of the Quilombhoje. The publication was sold mainly in bookstores and hand-to-hand by Quilombhoje members themselves and was well received by those who had access to it. Since then, uninterruptedly, other volumes were released - one per year - alternating poems and tales of many styles and writers from various states of Brazil. The collection now occupies a prominent place among the publications aimed at displaying the texts of Afro-Brazilian black writers and reaffirming black identity politics.

No other anthologies have published regularly with Afro-Brazilian authors texts, largely due to the financial difficulties inherent in such publications. Thus, Cadernos Negros has been an important vehicle for providing visibility to Afro-Brazilian literature. The works produced have included discussions about literary aesthetics, ideological resistance to racism, the retention of black cultural heritage in spite of slavery, homage paid to African religions through Candomblé rites, and family values and sexuality. Cadernos Negros continues the Afro-Brazilian literary tradition while addressing current social issues that face the Afro-Brazilian community.

== Literary and cultural activities ==
=== Livros do Autor ===
Livros do Autor was a Quilombhoje project that included a discussion and subsequent selection of the texts to be published in the series. Cuti claimed Livros do Autor was important to Quilombhoje because it represented a conscious strategy to achieve progress in the literary field. Livros do Autor would feature prominent writers in Afro-Brazilian literature from the 19th and early 20th centuries including Castro Alves, Luís Gama, Cruz e Sousa, Lima Barreto, Lino Guedes, Jorge de Lima, and Solano Trindade. As author Niyi Afolabi writes, "Quilombhoje's response begins where the preabolition and postabolition writers left off, carefully dialoguing with their currents while at the same time renewing and redefining their own commitments and significance." Livros do Autor acted as "literary workshops" that evoked debate about Afro-Brazilian literature to advance the genre.

=== Reflexões ===
Quilombhoje published Reflexões in 1985 which was its first critical book on Afro-Brazilian literature. It documents the series of debates organized by Quilombhoje at the III Congress of Black Cultures in the Americas in 1982 at the Pontifical Catholic University of São Paulo. It was released in collaboration with the Council for the Participation and Development by Governor Orestes Quércia from the center-left Brazilian Democratic Movement Party (PMDB), a council which sought blacks’ social and political advancement. Reflexões emphasized the need for new black literature while paying homage to the Afro-Brazilian literary tradition.

=== Círculos de Poemas ===
Quilombhoje also sponsored poetry readings called círculos de poemas (poem circles) that paid homage to important Afro-Brazilian artists, including Luís Gama, Pixinguinha, and Lima Barreto.
