= Maria Romana Quilombola Community =

The Quilombola Community of Maria Romana is located in Tamoios, in the 2nd district of Cabo Frio in Rio de Janeiro, with approximately 1,700 inhabitants. It is a Quilombola community certified by the Palmares Foundation, and therefore listed as public heritage.

== History ==
The community was formed on land acquired by Elias Barreto, a slave who worked with his partner Romana da Conceição for about 30 years to pay for his land. In 1924, the land was registered in the name of Maria Romana, the daughter of Elias and Romana. Over the years, some families left the community to live near urban centers in search of work opportunities, however, family and social ties remained.

The remaining quilombo inhabitants of this community, located in Tamoios, the second district of Cabo Frio, total approximately 1,700. Currently, a large part of these people live outside the community's territory. However, since the group was certified as a quilombo on September 23, 2011, this process has been gradually reversing: individuals are returning to the lands of their ancestors. This fact makes the knowledge of the practices carried out by their ancestors an aggregating element for the members of the group.

Indeed, Lamiel Leopoldino Barreto, president of the Maria Romana Quilombola Community Association, aware of this need, has used oral accounts to produce documentary records of the group. He recounts: “My great-grandmother came from Africa, and my great-grandfather worked on the farm planting cassava , corn, and beans. But the farmer built them wooden houses that only lasted a year, because then they would move, and they would be left with the crops, as the house would collapse, and they were forced to find another place to live. My great-grandfather, when slavery ended, decided to buy land because he didn't want to see his children suffer like he had. [...] He paid the farmer one day a week to pay off his debt, and that's how he got money; he managed to leave his children land where they still live today.”

Since the lands occupied by part of the group are not sufficient for the number of people identified as belonging to the Quilombo de Maria Romana, land titling through Quilombola ancestry is a way to ensure that all families are included. In this sense, Lamiel highlights: “And now we are seeking land titling only for the sake of the community, because the land we have is insufficient for the number of families, you understand? The government allocates 14 hectares for each family.” He concludes: “Whoever has land, people, has everything. The dream of many people is to have land.”
