= Afro-Brazilian literature =

Afro-Brazilian literature has existed in Brazil since the mid-19th century with the publication of Maria Firmina dos Reis's novel Ursula in 1859. Other writers from the late 19th century and early 20th century include Machado de Assis, Cruz e Sousa and Lima Barreto. Yet, Afro-Brazilian literature as a genre that recognized the ethnic and cultural origins of the writer did not gain national prominence in Brazil until the 1970s with the revival of Black Consciousness politics known as the Movimento Negro.

== History ==
Literature written by individuals or groups of African ancestry in the present-day nation of Brazil, it can trace its origins to the 19th century. However, oral traditions of histories and narratives can be traced back to the 16th century when African slaves were brought across the Atlantic to work in the Portuguese colonies. Written forms of Afro-Brazilian literature do not appear until the 19th century with publications by writers such as Maria Firmina dos Reis, Cruz e Sousa and Machado de Assis.

There also existed during the 19th century a vast wealth of literature on Afro-Brazilians written by White Brazilians. Many of these writers were abolitionists that included Castro Alves, Joaquim Nabuco, Joaquim Manuel de Macedo, and Naturalist writers that included Aluísio Azevedo, Jose Veríssimo, and Raul Pompéia. The well known Bahian author of the 20th century, Jorge Amado, also included many aspects of Afro-Brazilian culture and religion in many of his novels such as Tenda dos Milagres (Tent of Miracles) and A Morte e a Morte de Quincas Berro Dágua (The Two Deaths of Quincas Wateryell).

With the largest population of African descendants outside of Africa found in Brazil, the importance of focusing on Afro-Brazilian literature has increased in recent years with the publication of multiple anthologies and literary criticisms revolving around Afro-Brazilian writers. Furthermore, Afro-Brazilian literature reflects the complex relationship between Brazil's long history of slavery, its politics of branqueamento (racial whitening) that were implemented by the Brazilian government during the late 19th and beginning of the 20th century, and the myth of racial democracy that pervaded and still exists within the Brazilian national consciousness.

== Major writers/contributors ==
=== 19th century ===
==== Maria Firmina dos Reis ====
Born in São Luiz do Maranhão October 11, 1825, Maria Firmina dos Reis was a mulata woman living in a segregated society. Her maternal aunt was crucial in her education as well the writer Sotero dos Reis. During the beginning of the 1880s, she creates the first free and coed state school in Maranhão while simultaneously maintaining a constant presence in the local press publishing poetry, fiction and chronicles. In 1859, she publishes her best known book, Úrsula which focuses on the issue of slavery from the perspective of the "Other". Because of the attitudes regarding the silencing and submission of women in 19th-century Brazilian society, Maria Firmina dos Reis omits her name from the cover of "Úrsula" and writes the pseudonym "Uma Maranhense" (A Maranhese woman). It is not until 1975, when Horácio de Almeida publishes a facsimile of Úrsula, that Maria Firmina dos Reis is revealed as the author of the book.

==== Machado de Assis ====
Considered to be the greatest Brazilian writer and the first writer to be inducted into the Brazilian Academy of Letters, Machado de Assis was a mulatto (more specifically, a quadroon) whose grandparents were slaves.

=== 20th century ===
==== Quilombhoje ====
An Afro-Brazilian literary group founded by a group of Paulistanos in 1980 by Cuti, Oswaldo de Camargo, Paulo Colina, Abelardo Rodrigues and others, its objective was to discuss and deepen the understanding of Afro-Brazilians in literature. It also desired to promote the habit of reading and to develop and to encourage studies, research and analysis concerning Black literature and culture. The group is best known for its annual publication of Cadernos Negros (Black Notebooks), an anthology of poetry, fiction, and essays by Afro-Brazilian writers, artists and intellectuals. In collaboration with other organizations and academic literary departments, they have created courses, seminars, and debates about Afro-Brazilian literature and questions of race in literature. Since 1999 the group is coordinated by Esmeralda Ribeiro and Márcio Barbosa.

=== Late 20th/early 21st century ===
==== Joel Rufino dos Santos ====
He was a Brazilian historian, writer, and human rights activist. He also wrote children's and non-fiction books. Santos was an important exponent of Afro-Brazilian literature in Brazil in the second half of the 20th century and was a professor at the Federal University of Rio de Janeiro. He became known for his contributions to the history of Afro-Brazilian culture and literature in Brazil. At the same time he fought in his work for recognition of the black minority and against racism. He was also a fighter for democracy in Brazil.

==== Paulo Lins ====
Best known for his novel Cidade de Deus (City of God), Paulo Lins currently teaches at the Federal University of Rio de Janeiro. Cidade de Deus was the result of eight years of ethnographic fieldwork that Lins conducted in the favela of the same name and where he grew up as a child. Lins is currently working on a book that deals with slavery in Brazil since the 15th century.

==== Ferréz and Literatura Marginal (Marginal Literature) ====
Literatura Marginal was another Afro-Brazilian literary group founded by a group of writers and artists from the São Paulo favela of Capão Redondo in 2005. This literary group has a strong relationship with the hip-hop culture of São Paulo with writers crossing over into the production of rap, and rap artists crossing over into the field of literary production. One of the leaders of Literatura Marginal, Ferrez, is considered to be the most published and best known writer of this group. His first publication came in 1997 with a collection of poetry entitled Fortaleza da Desilusão (Fortress of Disillusion). He then published two novels: Capão Pecado and O Manual Pratico do Odio (The Practical Manual of Hate). His writings have a prominent aesthetic of gratuitous violence and sex that conveys life in the urban periphery. The use of slang and Afro-Brazilian cultural and historical allusions is commonly found throughout his novels as well.

== Afro-Brazilian literary studies and criticism ==
In recent years, Afro-Latino Studies has gained attention in U.S., Latin-American, European and African universities. Within this broad field of study, Afro-Brazilian Literary & Cultural Studies has also gained traction in National Literature, Anthropology, History, and other academic departments. Several notable books include The Afro-Brazilian Mind: Contemporary Afro-Brazilian Literary and Cultural Criticism, edited by Niyi Afolabi (Assistant Professor, Department of Spanish & Portuguese, University of Texas at Austin), that brings together writers, academics, and intellectuals from the U.S. and Brazil to focus on the genre of Afro-Brazilian literature and culture. Another important book is Writing Identity: The Politics of Afro-Brazilian Literature by Emanuelle Oliveira (Associate Professor, Department of Spanish & Portuguese, Vanderbilt University) uses Pierre Bourdieu's theory of culture production to analyze Quilombhoje's literary and cultural production as Afro-Brazilians. Black Brazil: Culture, Identity, and Social Mobilization, edited by Randal Johnson and Larry Crook, is a collection of essays that focus on Afro-Brazilians through the fields of anthropology, history, sociology, literary studies, religious studies, and performance studies.
