= Dulce Pereira =

Brazilian academic, environmentalist and Afro-Brazilian activist

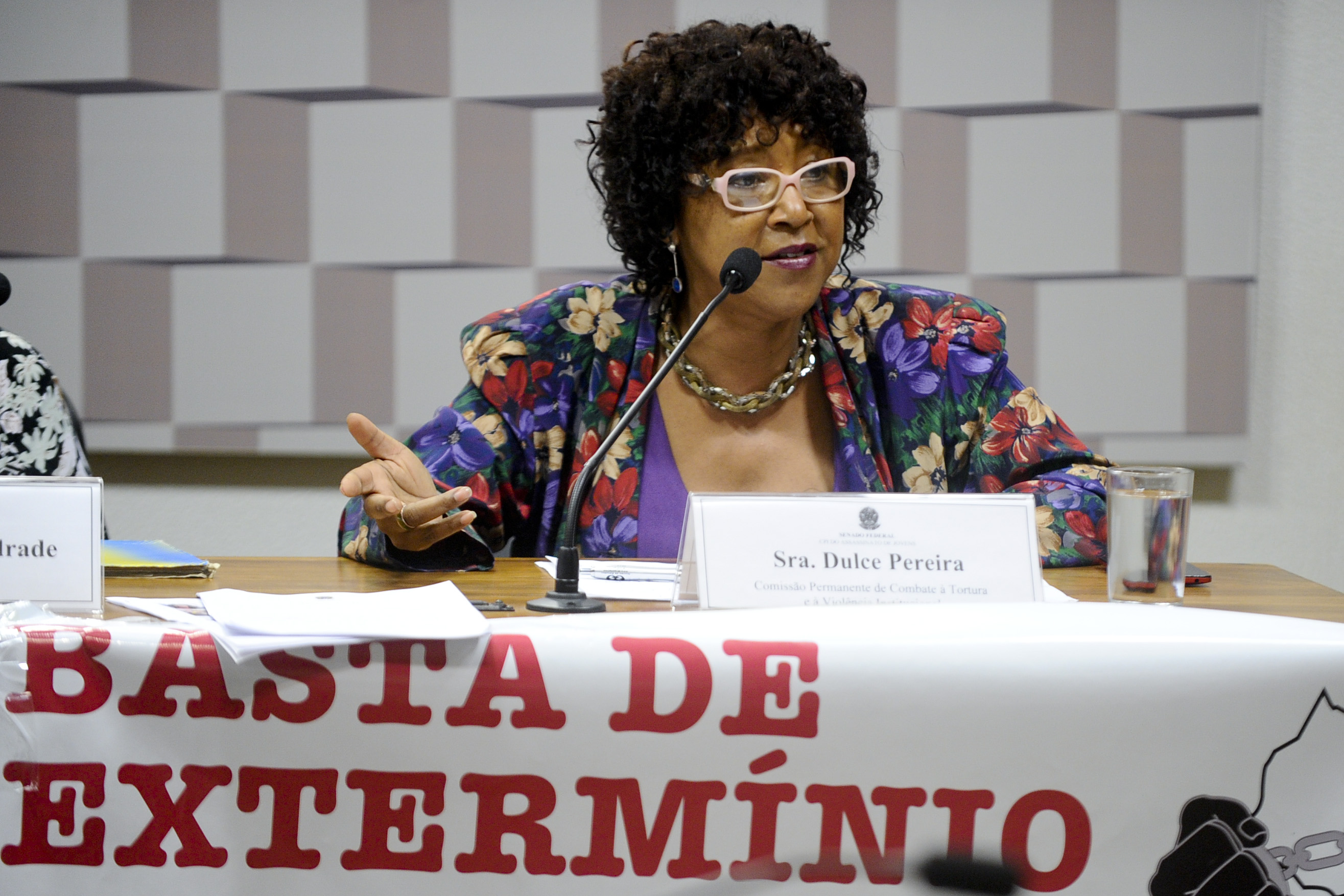
- Pereira in June 2016

President of the Palmares Cultural Foundation
- In office 10 July 1996 – 21 February 2001
- President: Fernando Henrique Cardoso
- Preceded by: Joel Rufino dos Santos
- Succeeded by: Carlos Alves Moura

Executive Secretary of the Community of Portuguese Language Countries
- In office 20 July 2000 – 16 August 2002
- Preceded by: Marcolino Moco
- Succeeded by: João Augusto de Médicis

Personal details
- Born: 1954 (age 71–72) São José do Rio Preto, São Paulo state, Brazil
- Party: PT
- Education: University of Brasília University of Michigan Federal University of Maranhão University of São Paulo Federal University of Ouro Preto

Dulce Pereira (born 1954) is a Brazilian architect, environmentalist, and professor. Among other activities she has been the president of the Palmares Cultural Foundation and, as a Brazilian diplomat, president of the Community of Portuguese Language Countries. As of 2024 she was employed by the Brazilian Ministry of Women. Pereira is a long-time member of the Workers' Party (Partido dos Trabalhadores - PT).

== Early life and education ==
Dulce Pereira was born in 1954 in São José do Rio Preto in the interior of São Paulo state in Brazil. She was the daughter of a nurse and a housewife. She studied at public schools in São José do Rio Preto, and has said that on occasions she lacked money to buy school uniforms. During the Brazilian economic crisis of 1962 to 1968, she has been quoted as saying that she ate pasta every day. At the age of seventeen she took part in a student competition, winning a scholarship to the United States, where she went to school at the South Milwaukee High School. There, she lived with a family who supported the Democratic Party and she began to participate in the black student movement. During that period, she met members of the African National Congress, with whom she maintained close friendships.

Between 1975 and 1980 Pereira studied architecture and urbanism at the University of Brasília (UnB) and graduated with a thesis on a "Project for a residential and commercial complex suited to ecology and local history". In 1979 she studied English at the University of Michigan. Between 1984 and 1985 she studied at the Instituto de Pesquisas e Estudos Afro Brasileiros (Institute of Afro-Brazilian Research and Studies - IPEAFRO), and produced a thesis on "Spatial occupation defined by historical inequalities in racist societies". In 2009 she started to study for a PhD. on "History and Atlantic Connections: cultures and powers" from the Federal University of Maranhão (UFMA) in Maranhão state. Her work on this degree was interrupted by several other periods of study, including at the Fundação Getulio Vargas (FGV) in São Paulo state in 2022, where she studied law and development; the University of São Paulo Ribeirão Preto campus in 2018, where she studied "networks and processes for comprehensive repair in areas affected by socio-technological disasters"; and at the Federal University of Ouro Preto (UFOP) in 2012, where she studied materials engineering.

== Career ==
Following her studies at IPEAFRO, Pereira took various jobs, including in radio and TV, until in 1996, when she was appointed as president of the Palmares Cultural Foundation (Fundação Cultural Palmares), a Brazilian state-owned non-governmental organization that promotes Afro-Brazilian culture and which is linked to the Brazilian Ministry of Culture. In 2000 she became the Executive Secretary of the Community of Portuguese Language Countries (Comunidade dos Países de Lingua Portuguesa), with ambassadorial status, serving for two years. Until 2023 she was a professor at the Centre for Open and Distance Education at the Federal University of Ouro Preto (CEAD / UFOP), where she developed research and carried out teaching into ecotechnologies and materials to reduce the use of natural resources, with an emphasis on buildings and spatial organization. She researches and writes about territoriality, risk, exclusion and inclusion mechanisms, especially relating to gender and the Brazilian population of African origin, with an emphasis on black women. She was the coordinator of the Agenda 21 Programme and the Future Studies Centre of the Department of Production Engineering, Administration and Economics, of the Escola de Minas (UFOP) and of the Training Process in Environmental Education and Sustainable Schools of UFOP.

In July 2023, Pereira was appointed as an advisor at the federal Ministry of Women to work on maintaining permanent channels of dialogue with women's social movements and other segments of civil society, in conjunction with the National Council for Women's Rights (CNDM), and to provide administrative support to the CNDM. On taking up her appointment, she indicated that she also planned to develop more productive relationships between the ministry and universities.

Pereira has worked closely with bodies such as the Unified Black Movement (Movimento Negro Unificado - MNU), which is a political, cultural, and social activism group. She has published widely, both in academic journals and in the mass media.
