= Adão Ventura =

President of the Palmares Cultural Foundation
- In office 10 January 1991 – 21 January 1994
- President: Fernando Collor, Itamar Franco
- Preceded by: Carlos Alves Moura
- Succeeded by: Joel Rufino dos Santos

Personal details
- Born: July 5, 1939 Santo Antônio do Itambé, Minas Gerais, Brazil
- Died: July 12, 2004 (aged 65) Belo Horizonte, Minas Gerais, Brazil
- Education: Federal University of Minas Gerais

Adão Ventura Ferreira Reis (5 June 1939 – 12 June 2004) was a Brazilian poet. He served as the president of the Palmares Cultural Foundation.
