= Sérgio Nascimento de Camargo =

Brazilian journalist

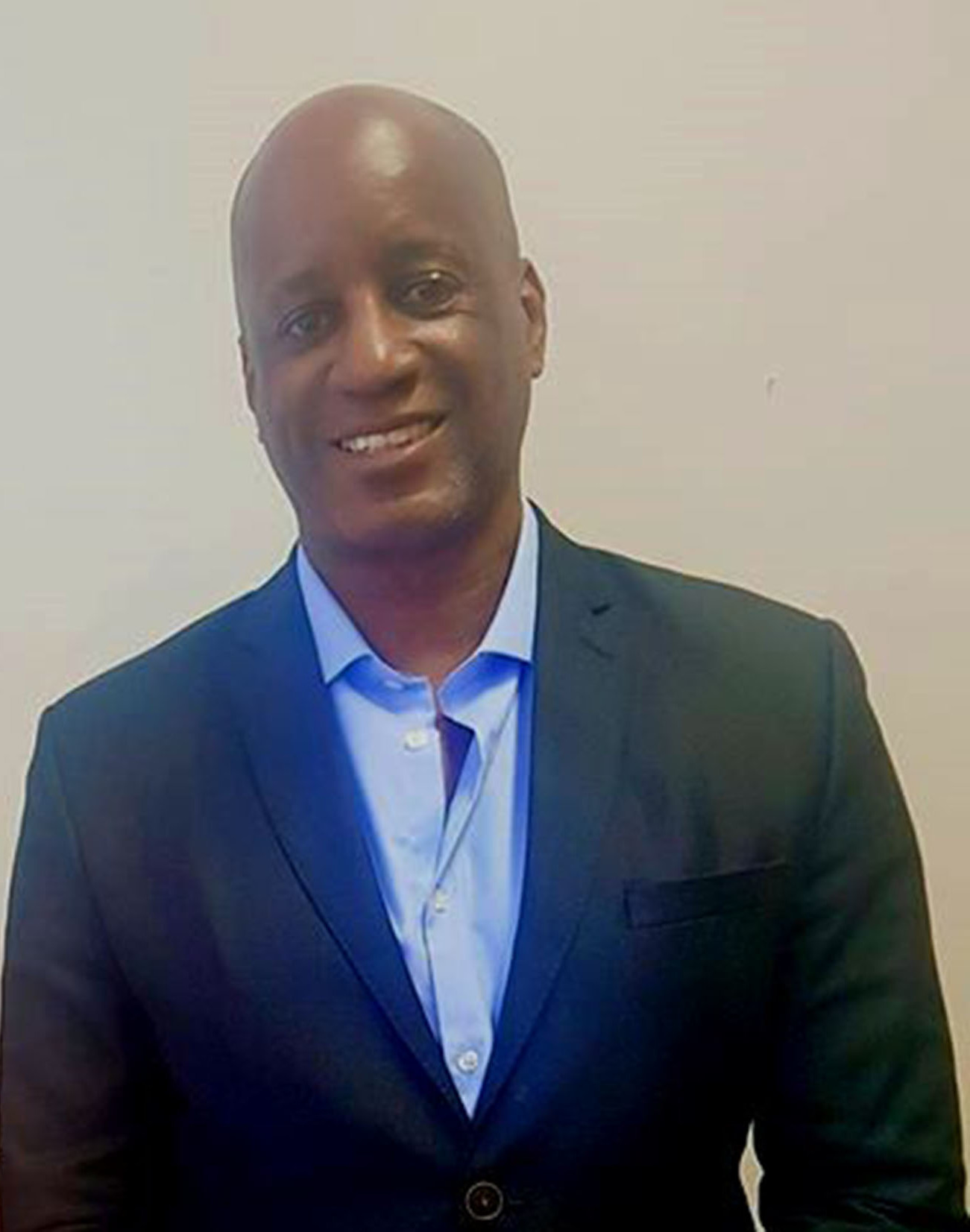

President of the Palmares Cultural Foundation
- In office November 2019 – 31 March 2022
- President: Jair Bolsonaro
- Preceded by: Vanderlei Lourenço
- Succeeded by: Marco Antônio Evangelista da Silva

Personal details
- Born: 15 April 1965 (age 61) São Paulo, São Paulo, Brazil
- Party: PL (2022–present)
- Parent: Oswaldo de Camargo (father)
- Relatives: Wadico Camargo (brother)
- Education: Pontifical Catholic University of São Paulo
- Occupation: Journalist

Sérgio Nascimento de Camargo (born April 15, 1965) is a Brazilian journalist and politician, affiliated with the PL. He is known for his conservative positions and for having assumed, from 2019 to 2022, the presidency of Fundação Cultural Palmares, a Brazilian body for the promotion of Afro-Brazilian culture.

Camargo was discharged from his post on March 31, 2022, because he will run for a seat in the Chamber of Deputies in the 2022 Brazilian general election.

== Biography ==
Sérgio is the son of the writer Oswaldo de Camargo and brother of the cultural producer and musician Oswaldo de Camargo Filho, better known as Wadico Camargo. In November 2019, Sérgio replaced Vanderlei Lourenço as president of Fundação Cultural Palmares.

Before taking the position at Fundação Palmares, Camargo worked as editor and reporter for medias such as Rádio Eldorado, CBN, Folha de São Paulo and Agência Estado.

== Presidency role ==
On March 10, 2020, Camargo extinguished seven collegiate bodies (the Management Committee of the Quilombo dos Palmares Memorial Park; the Permanent Special Account Management Commission; the Governance Committee; the Open Data Committee; the Management Plan Sustainable Logistics Management, the Special Inventory and Disposal Commission and the Information Security Committee) and revoked acts of nomination of the members of these committees and commissions.

== Controversies ==
=== Criticism of the black movement ===
In 2019, Camargo considered the consequences of slavery in Brazil to be less than usually recognized, stating that "slavery was terrible, but beneficial for the descendants". He also stated that "Brazil has 'nutella' (lite) racism. Real racism exists in the US. The black people here complain because they are imbeciles and uninformed by the left".

However, in-depth studies on the issue have shown that the denial of the negative consequences of slavery in Brazil is a serious modern violence for postponing the social evolution of millions of children who still suffer from the slavery heritage in the country.país. Even with the stance that goes against the historical and ethnic-racial solutions in Brazil, and after a lawsuit had removed Sérgio from the role of president of the foundation, President Jair Bolsonaro insisted on his appointment.

In May 2020, a leaked audio by Sérgio records the then president of the Palmares Foundation, classifying the black movement as “cursed scum”, which would house “vagabonds”, and calling Zumbi “son of a bitch who enslaved blacks”. In the same audio, Camargo also expressed contempt for the "Black Consciousness" agenda, referred to a mãe-de-santo as "macumbeira" and promised to put on the street directors of that municipality who do not have the "goal" of firing a "leftist".

On June 25, 2020, Camargo declared that the black movement is a "set of ideological slaves of the left".

In 2021, Sérgio Camargo had an open complaint with the Public Ministry of Labor for crimes such as moral harassment, ideological persecution and persecution. The complaints were made by former employees of the Palmares Foundation and the PML asked for Sérgio to be removed from the position.

=== Historical Revisionism ===
The head of the presidency of the Palmares Foundation, removed names from the list of honorees such as Benedita da Silva, Marielle Franco and Zumbi dos Palmares himself.

In 2021, he stated that the works in the Foundation's collection would undergo a “strict evaluation” with the aim of excluding those that were not part “of the context dedicated to the black theme”. The survey would be made available in the so-called “First Detailed Public Report” and works on other topics would initially be donated. Subsequently, the Federal Court of Rio de Janeiro determined that Camargo should not donate the books, under penalty of a fine, despite him saying that it was no longer his intention: ‘You don’t donate what is not good’.
