= Joel Rufino dos Santos =

Brazilian writer and historian

President of the Palmares Cultural Foundation
- In office 21 January 1994 – 10 July 1996
- President: Itamar Franco, Fernando Henrique Cardoso
- Preceded by: Adão Ventura
- Succeeded by: Dulce Pereira

Personal details
- Born: June 19, 1941 Cascadura, Rio de Janeiro, Brazil
- Died: 4 September 2015 (aged 73–74)
- Occupation: Academic, writer
- Website: joelrufinodossantos.com.br

Joel Rufino dos Santos (19 June 1941 – 4 September 2015) was a Brazilian academic and writer, including historian and novelist.

== Life and career ==
Rufino dos Santos was born in 1941 in Rio de Janeiro.

He was a professor at the Federal University of Rio de Janeiro.

Rufino dos Santos is considered one of the country's greatest historians as well as a novelist and writer, having been one of the leading names in the study of African culture and Afro-Brazilian literature in Brazil.

== Death ==
He died from complications from cardiac surgery on 4 September 2015.

== See also ==
- List of Brazilian writers
- List of historians
- List of novelists
