= Narcisa Amália =

Brazilian writer and poet

- Known for: first woman professional journalist in Brazil
- Writing career
- Genres: poetry journalism
- Notable work: Nebulosas

Narcisa Amália de Oliveira Campos (São João da Barra, 3 April 1856 - Rio de Janeiro, 24 June 1924) was a Brazilian poet, and women's rights activist. She is also considered the first woman professional journalist in Brazil.

== Biography ==
Narcisa Amália was born in São João da Barra in 1856. In addition to several newspapers, she wrote for O Sexo Feminino (1870s), and collaborated in the journal A leitura (Reading; 1894–1896). In her debut book, Nebulosas, she advanced the importance of the role of the press in the struggle against slavery. During this period, only few women were able to achieve renown as poets and literary figures in Brazil. This is attributed to the lack of women participation in Brazilian politics, literature, and education during the peak and decline of the country's pariarchal system. After publishing Nebulosas, Amália became engaged in a bitter dispute as it "was attributed to a 'young man' who borrowed her name".

Amália became active in the abolitionist movement and was credited, along with Maria Firmina dos Reis, for her literary production that challenged racist ideologies in Brazil. She published Miragem, Nelumbia and O Romance da Mulher que Amou. Driven by strong social sensitivity, she fought against women's oppression. A women's rights activist, her 1892 book A Mulher do Século XIX (Women of the Nineteenth Century), was a call to women to fight for their rights.

Some of her writing was published in a work by Antônio Simões dos Reis. Critical study of her work has been done by Christina Ramalho in Um espelho para Narcisa: Reflexos de uma voz romantica (1999). This book also discussed her life.

== Selected works ==
- Nebulosas, 1872
- Miragem
- Nelumbia
- O Romance da Mulher que Amou
- A Mulher do Século XIX
