= Johan Gørbitz =

Norwegian painter (1782–1853)

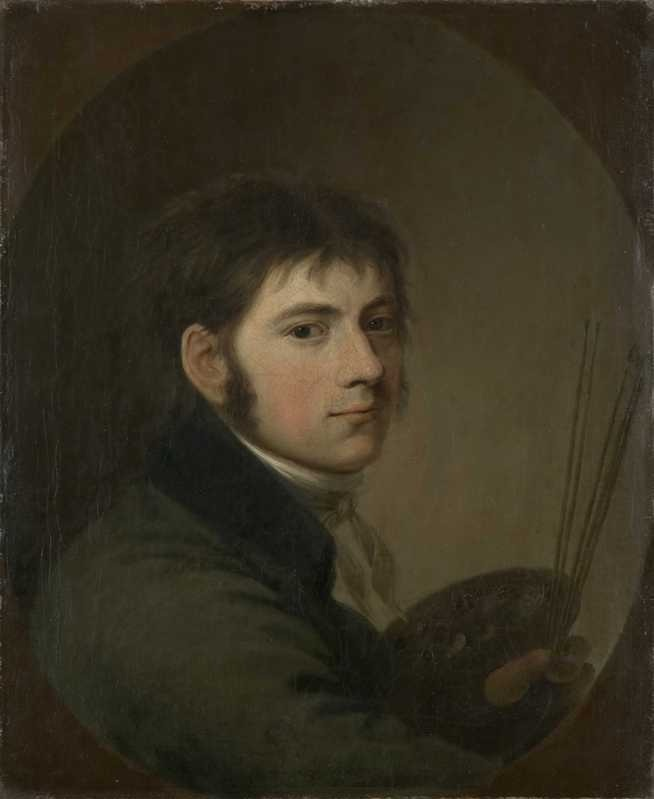
Self-portrait (c.1800)

Johan Görbitz (8 September 1782 – 3 July 1853) was a Norwegian painter. He is most associated with his portraits of prominent Norwegians.

Görbitz was born in Sandviken, Norway. He was one of ten children born to Martin Görbitz (1738-1796) and Lucia Pytter (1762-1825). His father was a successful merchant in Bergen, Norway. In 1798, he was sent to Copenhagen to develop his artistic talents at the Royal Danish Academy of Fine Arts. In 1802, he returned to Bergen, where until 1805 he worked as a portrait painter. From 1805 to 1807, he was again in Copenhagen to continue their education, but then traveled to Dresden and Vienna.

In 1809 he moved to Paris, where for many years he remained a popular portrait painter. In 1836, he returned to Norway and settled in Christiania (now Oslo). During the 1840s, he was one of Norway's more popular portrait artists and painted many of significant men and women on the time.

== Gallery ==
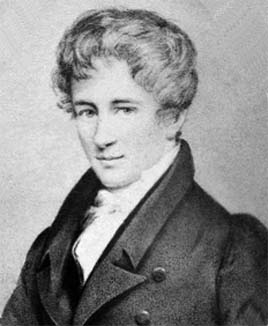
Niels Henrik Abel

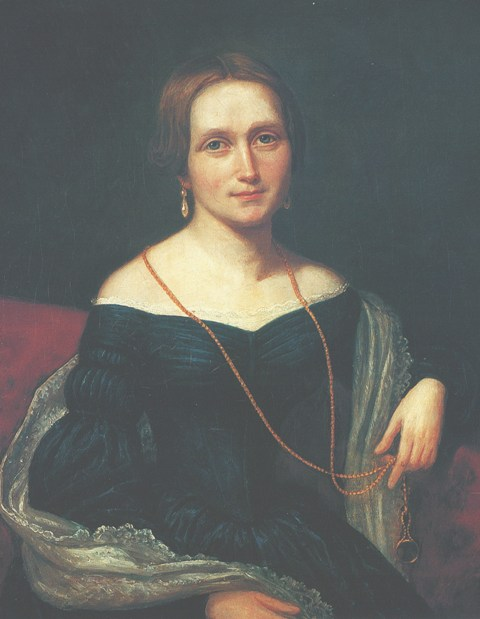
Camilla Collett

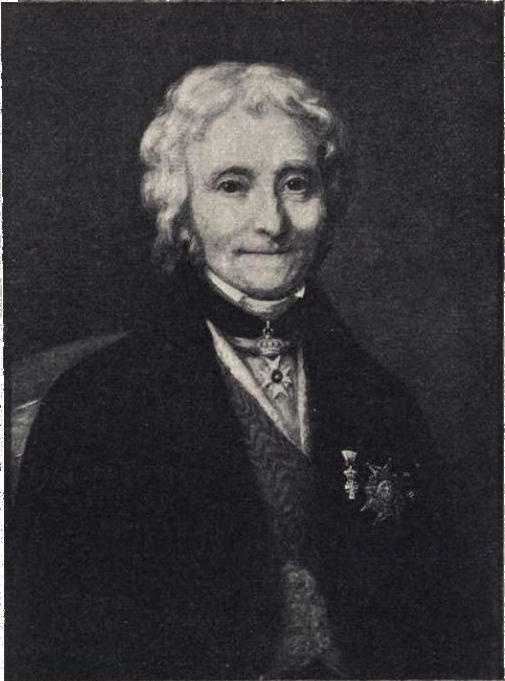
Jonas Collett

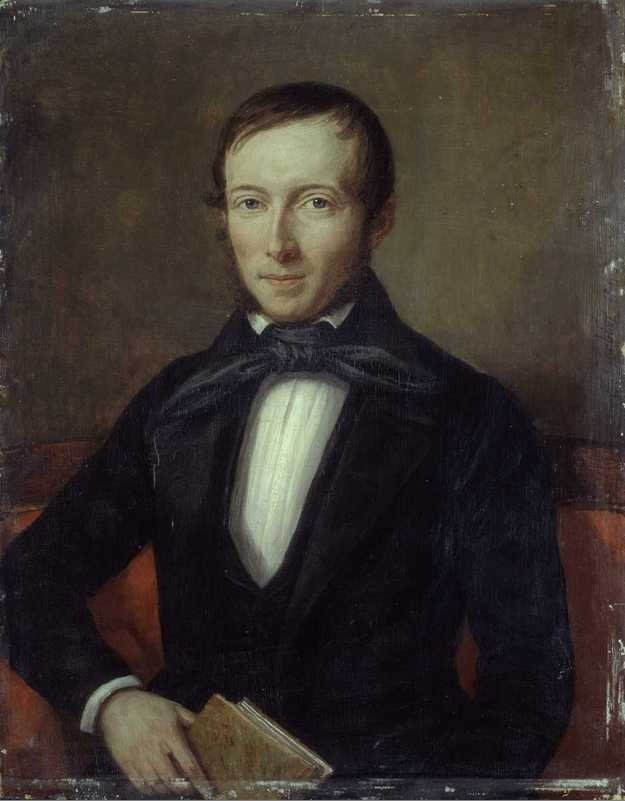
Peter Jonas Collett

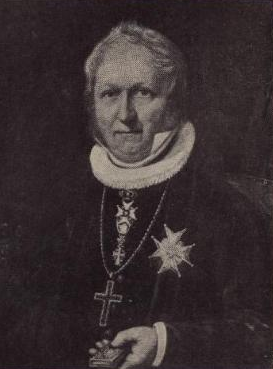
Jacob Neumann

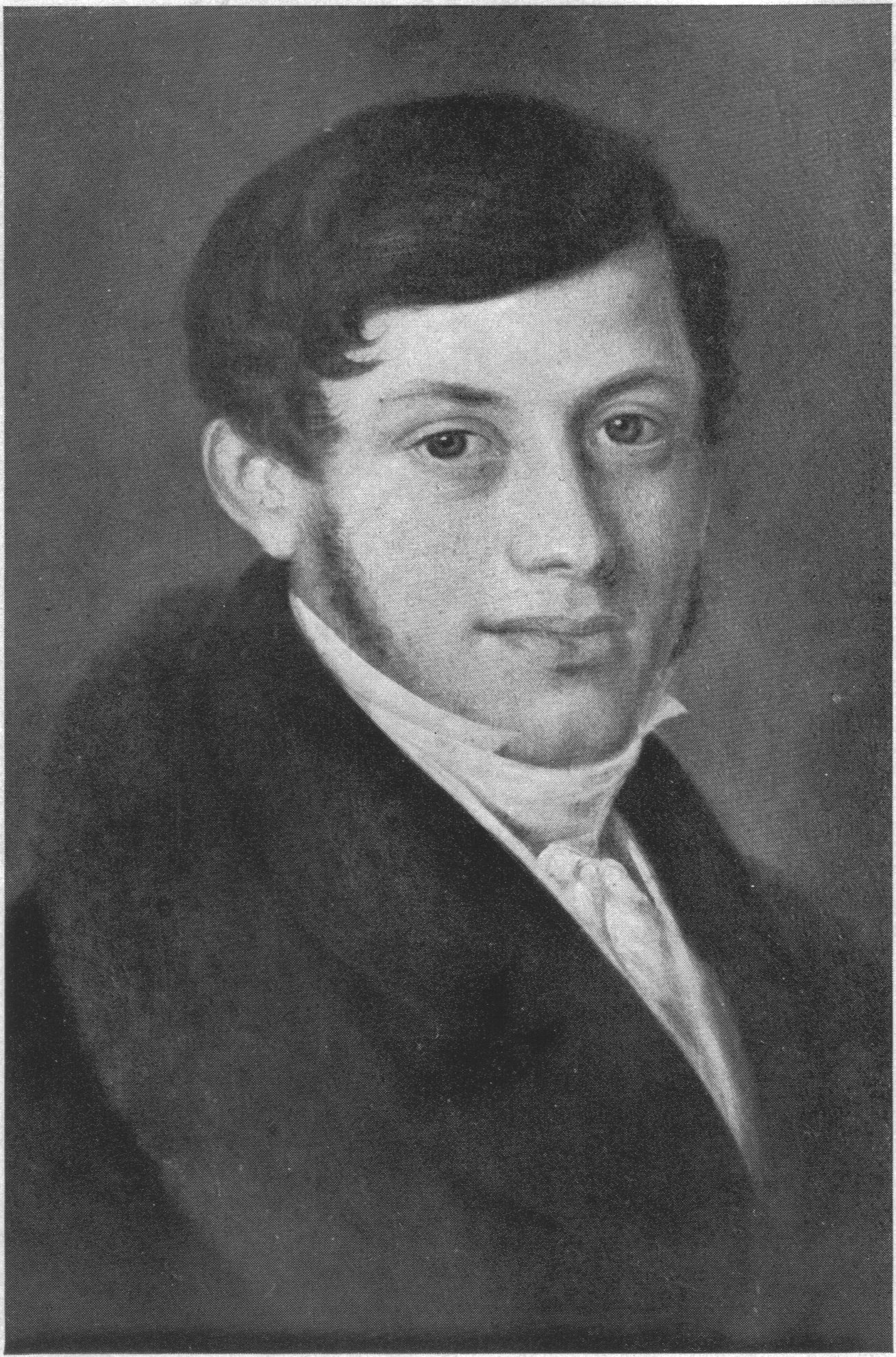
Frederik Stang
