= Miriam Alves =

Brazilian writer, activist and poet (born 1952)

Miriam Aparecida Alves (born 1952) is a Brazilian writer, activist and poet.

== Biography ==
Alves was born in São Paulo. She began writing for pleasure at the age of eleven and would later rewrite material from her personal notebooks for publication. She earned a degree in Social Work and worked as a social worker for the city of São Paulo. Her writings mostly covered race and gender issues, including the European beauty standard in Brazil and women's roles in the social construct. She was inaugurated into the Municipal School for Professor Miriram Alves of Macedo Guimaraes in March 2016.

=== Travels ===
She traveled to the Portuguese school at Middlebury College in 2010 where she taught culture and Brazilian Literature classes. Due to her heavy influence with Quilombhoje literature, she was a special visitor to the University of New Mexico. She also participated in debates about Afro-Brazilian literature and feminism at the University of Texas, the University of Tennessee and at the University of Illinois. Due to her international travel she is a part of movements like the Contemporary Afro-Brazilian Literary Movement in the United States; Moving Beyond Boundaries: International Dimension of Black Women's Writing in England; and Black Poetry in Germany.

She was once a guest speaker at the International Conference of Caribbean Women Writers and Scholars at the Florida International University in 1996. She also gave a talk titled A Invisibilidade da Literatura Afro-feminina: de Carolina de Jesus a Nós at the Latin American Speakers Symposium in New York in 1997. She also presented her work called Resgate in Vienna, Austria in November 1995.

=== Works ===
"Birth"
A deaf drumming
hurts to hear
To live to live
trapped in the cage
female bird
I've already seen the infinite
I was constellation
Now I'm a wandering asteroid
shooting star
I divided myself in two
Divided in order to not be subtracted
I stayed whole if dented in each piece
I cried because I was being born

Alves had difficulties publishing her work due to the closed off atmosphere Brazil contained toward Afro-Brazilian writers. Her works not only showcased her activist role against the racial divide but also emphasized the experiences she faces as an Afro-Brazilian woman.

Her poems and short stories have been included in a number of anthologies, including Axé - Antologia Contemporânea da Poesia Negra Brasileira (Axé - Anthology of Contemporary Brazilian Black poetry) (1982), Razão da Chama (The Reason of the Flame) (1986) and Moving Beyond Boundaries, International Dimension of Black Women's Writing (1995). Her work has also appeared in the literary journal Callaloo. Alves was a member of Quilombhoje, a group of black writers who published a series of anthologies Cadernos negros (Black notebooks) from 1980 to 1989. She was an editor for the bilingual volume Enfim...Nos, Finally...Us, which was the first work to be published by an Afro-Brazilian after Quarto de Despejo by Three Continents Press. This book was a collaboration of poems from eighteen different Afro-Brazilian women. She also edited Escritoras Negras Brasileiras Contemporaneas and Contemporary Black Brazilian Women Writers, published in 1995. Her works have been translated to English and German.

Two collections of her poems have been published: Momentos de busca (Moments of searching) (1983) and Estrelas no dedo (Stars in the fingers) (1985). Momentos de Busca was a collection piece made from all of her poems from her adolescence to then. Her other works include: Brazilian Women Writers: Dual Brazilian-English Poetry Anthology, published in Colorado, USA (1995) and "Women Righting - Afro-Brazilian Women's Short Fiction", Short stories (2005).

She was co-author with Arnaldo Xavier and Cuti (Luiz Silva) of the play Terramara (1988). She has also written the books Brasilafro Autorrevelado (2010) and Mulher Mat(r)iz (2011).
