= Carlos Alves Moura =

Brazilian lawyer (born 1941/1942)

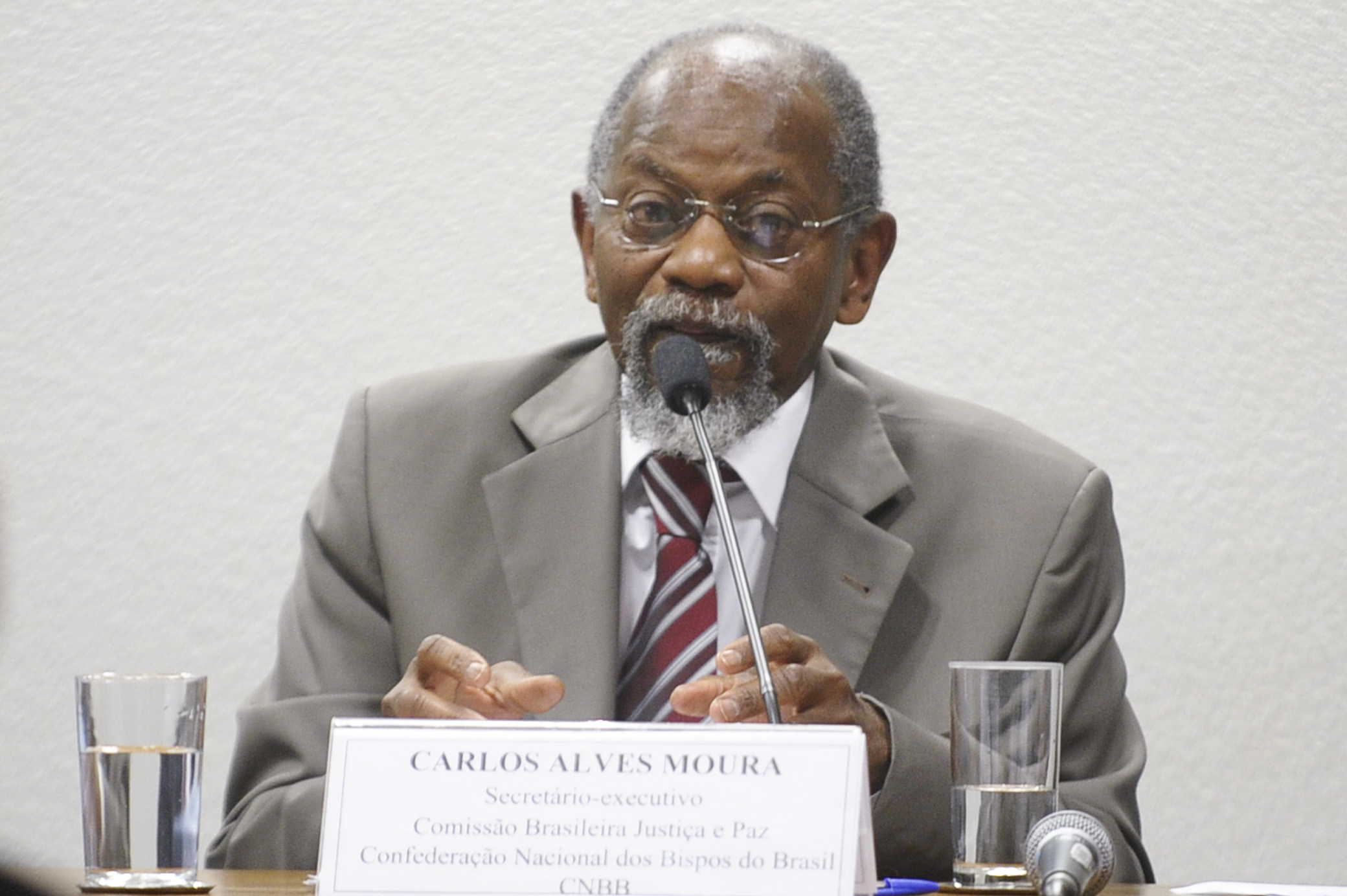

President of the Palmares Cultural Foundation
- In office 22 August 1988 – 10 January 1991
- President: José Sarney
- Preceded by: Office established
- Succeeded by: Adão Ventura
- In office 21 February 2001 – 21 January 2003
- President: Fernando Henrique Cardoso
- Preceded by: Dulce Pereira
- Succeeded by: Ubiratan Castro

Carlos Alves Moura (born 1941–1942) is a Brazilian lawyer and human rights activist. He served as the first president of the Palmares Cultural Foundation.
