= Esmeralda Ribeiro =

Brazilian journalist and writer

- Born: 1958 (age 67–68); Brazil

Esmeralda Ribeiro (born 1958) is a Brazilian journalist and writer of African descent.

She was born in São Paulo and studied journalism at the University of São Paulo. Ribeiro became a member of Quilombhoje, an Afro-Brazilian literary group, in 1982. Her first poems appeared in the 1982 anthology Cadernos negros (Black notebooks); her first short story "Ogun" appeared in the 1985 anthology. She later worked with Marcio Barbosa as editor for Cadernos negros. Her work was translated into English for the collections Moving Beyond Boundaries, International Dimension of Black Women's Writing and Enfim...Nos/Finally...Us: Escritoras Negras Brasileiras Contemporaneas/Contemporary Black Brazilian Women Writers, both published in 1995. Since then, she has appeared in practically every issue of the series, and is the writer with the greatest participation among women. She is currently (2023) the editorial coordinator of the series.

In 1988, she published a short novel Malungos e milongas.

Ribeiro has also worked for the São Paulo state Secretary of Culture.
