= Francisca Praguer Fróes =

Brazilian physician and activist

Francisca Praguer Froes
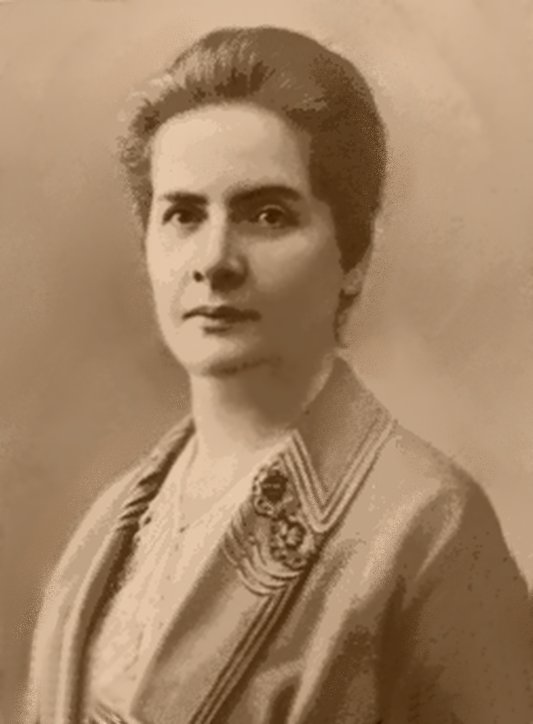
- Born: Francisca Praguer Froes; 21 October 1872; Cachoeira, Bahia, Brazil
- Died: 16 November 1931 (aged 59); Rio de Janeiro, Brazil
- Spouse: João Américo Garcez Fróes

Francisca Praguer Fróes (Cachoeira, Bahia, 21 October 1872 – Rio de Janeiro, 16 November 1931) was a Brazilian physician, activist, feminist and writer. She was one of five women in Brazil to complete a degree of higher education in 1893.

== Biography ==
Francisca graduated from the Bahian School of Medicine and Pharmacy in 1893 becoming the first woman in Brazil to be trained in medicine. Specializing in Gynecology and Obstetrics, Froes devoted herself to the field of political and civil rights of women. She was a diligent defender of women's rights to health, particularly those affected with sexually transmitted diseases. She was an advocate for public health and education on the topic of hygiene and sexual morality.

Borges claimed that Froes' career showed "how she used her position of authority within the medical profession as the fulcrum from which to press a feminist argument".

Aside from her studies on women's health, Froes was an advocate for political and scientific discussions on sexual morality. She focused on a broad discussion on the way society was constructed. She advocated for hygiene, sexual morale, and most of all health, recognizing that those key points should be a part of the social agenda.

At 27, Froes researched and studied using her medical background contributing to medical journals becoming one of the first female editors of her time.

In 1889, she married João Américo Garcez Fróes, a physician and academic.
