= Guimarães, Maranhão =

Guimarães
- Municipality
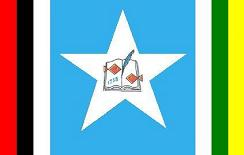
- Flag

- Location in Maranhão

- Location in Brazil
- Coordinates: 02°07′58″S 44°36′03″W
- Country: Brazil
- Region: Nordeste
- State: Maranhão
- Mesoregion: Norte Maranhense
- Founded: 1758

Area
  - Total: 598.796 km^{2} (231.196 sq mi)
- Elevation: 41 m (135 ft)

Population (2020)
  - Total: 11,997
  - Density: 20.035/km^{2} (51.891/sq mi)
- Time zone: UTC -3

Guimarães is a municipality in the state of Maranhão in the Northeast region of Brazil. It was founded as New Guimarães (after Guimarães, Portugal) in 1758.

The municipality contains a small part of the Baixada Maranhense Environmental Protection Area, a 1,775,035.6-hectare (4,386,208-acre) sustainable use conservation unit created in 1991 that has been a Ramsar Site since 2000.

== Notable residents ==
- Maria Firmina dos Reis (1825 – 1917), abolitionist and author

== See also ==
- List of municipalities in Maranhão
