= Academia Catarinense de Letras =

The Academia Catarinense de Letras (ACL) (English: Catarinense Academy of Letters) is a Brazilian literary non-profit society, and it is the maximum literary authority in the State of Santa Catarina.

The ACL is located in the city of Florianópolis, at the Centro Integrado de Cultura Professor Henrique da Silva Fontes (CIC) (English: Integrated Cultural Center).

== History ==
With the objective to promote the literary production and congregate the men of letters in Santa Catarina, the Sociedade Catharinense de Letras (Catarinense Society of Letters) was formed on October 30, 1920, from an invitation of José Boiteux.

The idea had been initiated twice in the previous decade by the then young writer Othon da Gama Lobo d'Eça, but it did not take off. But in May 1921 it had its statutes approved and fourteen founding members occupied their chairs. The Patrons for each chair were chosen, and distributed in alphabetical order.

In 1924, inspired by the Academia Brasileira de Letras, the society changes its name to Academia Catarinense de Letras. At the time, sixteen of the forty chairs were still vacant.

Differently from similar academies, the ACL has accepted women in their ranks from the very beginning, with Delminda Silveira being the first member of the chair number 10, and Maura de Senna Pereira the first member of chair number 38.

== Composition ==
The Academia Catarinense de Letras is composed by forty writers either born in Santa Catarina or that made history in the State. The chairs are lifetime positions, that is, new members can only be chosen after the death of a current member. When a chair is vacant, the Academy organizes an election between the remaining members to choose the new member. Any writer can postulate the chair, as long as they have a published book. The members of the Academy are called "immortals".

== List of the immortals and their chairs ==
Chair	Patron	Founder	Successors
1	Álvaro de Carvalho	Clementino Fausto Barcelos de Brito	Arnaldo Silveira Brandão ► Edy Leopoldo Tremel
2	Antero dos Reis Dutra	Laércio Caldeira de Andrada	Silveira Júnior ► Urda Alice Klueger
3	Carlos de Faria	Alfredo Filipe da Luz	Paulo Lago ► Moacir Pereira
4	Cláudio Luís da Costa	Luís Antônio Ferreira Gualberto	Carlos da Costa Pereira ► José Ferreira da Silva ► João Alfredo Medeiros Vieira
5	Crispim Mira	Leopoldo de Diniz Martins Júnior	Theobaldo Costa Jamundá ► Francisco José Pereira
6	Duarte Mendes de Sampaio	João Nepomuceno Manfredo Leite	Paulo Gonçalves Weber Vieira da Rosa
7	Duarte Paranhos Schutel	Juvêncio de Araújo Figueiredo	Francisco de Oliveira e Silva ► Raulino Reitz ► Leatrice Moellmann
8	Eduardo Duarte Silva	Marcos Konder	Vítor Konder ► Carlos Gomes de Oliveira ► Polidoro Ernani de São Thiago ► Sílvio Coelho dos Santos ► Mário Pereira
9	Feliciano Nunes Pires	Anfilóquio de Carvalho Gonçalves	Ivens Bastos de Araújo ► Martinho José Calado Júnior ► João Nicolau Carvalho
10	Francisco Antônio Castorino de Farias	Delminda Silveira	Castorina Lobo de São Thiago ► Júlio de Queiroz
11	Francisco Carlos da Luz	Edmundo da Luz Pinto	Henrique Stodieck ► Glauco Rodrigues Correia ► Hoyêdo de Gouvêa Lins
12	Francisco Pedro da Cunha	Heitor Pinto da Luz e Silva	Holdemar Meneses ► Edson Ubaldo
13	Francisco Tolentino	Tito Carvalho	José Artulino Besen
14	Gustavo de Lacerda	Silveira Lenzi	
15	Cruz e Sousa	Othon da Gama Lobo d'Eça	Celestino Sachet
16	João Justino Proença	Horácio Serapião de Carvalho	Alcides Abreu
17	Jerônimo Coelho	José Arthur Boiteux	Oswaldo Rodrigues Cabral ► Carlos Humberto Pederneiras Corrêa
18	João Silveira de Sousa	Henrique Fontes	José Curi
19	Joaquim Antônio de São Tiago	Arnaldo Claro São Tiago	Arthur Pereira e Oliveira
20	Joaquim Augusto do Livramento	Fúlvio Aducci	Custódio Francisco de Campos ► Victor Antônio Peluso Júnior
21	Joaquim Gomes de Oliveira e Paiva	Joe Collaço	
22	Jonas de Oliveira Ramos	Nereu Ramos	Joaquim Domingues de Oliveira ► Luiz Gallotti
23	José Cândido de Lacerda Coutinho	Altino Corsino da Silva Flores	Flávio José Cardozo
24	José Johanny	Francisco Barreiros Filho	Liberato Manuel Pinheiro Neto
25	Juvêncio Martins Costa	Amaro Seixas Ribeiro Neto	Paschoal Apóstolo Pítsica
26	Lauro Müller	Adolfo Konder	Sylvia Amelia Carneiro da Cunha
27	Luís Delfino	João Batista Crespo	Pedro Bertolino
28	Lídio Martins Barbosa	Osvaldo Melo	Péricles Prade
29	Liberato Bittencourt	Edmundo Acácio Soares Moreira	Napoleão Xavier do Amarante
30	Manuel Joaquim de Almeida Coelho	Lucas Alexandre Boiteux	Jaldyr Bhering Faustino da Silva ► Jali Meirinho
31	Manuel José de Sousa França	Henrique Boiteux	Walter Piazza
32	Manuel dos Santos Lostada	Gustavo Neves	Lauro Junkes
33	Manuel da Silva Mafra	Gil Costa	Renato de Medeiros Barbosa
34	Marcelino Antônio Dutra	Ogê Mannebach	Jorge Borges Cordeiro da Silva
35	Martinho José Calado e Silva	Haroldo Genésio Calado	Lydio Martinho Calado
36	Oscar Rosas	José dos Santos de Diniz Martins	Iaponan Soares
37	Polidoro Olavo de São Tiago	Ivo d'Aquino Fonseca	Licurgo Ramos da Costa
38	Roberto Trompowski	Maura de Senna Pereira	Salomão Ribas Junior
39	Sebastião Catão Calado	Carlos José da Mota de Azevedo Correia	Almiro Caldeira de Andrada
40	Virgílio Várzea	Nereu Correia	Norberto Ungaretti
