= Lucia Pytter =

Norwegian philanthropist (1762-1825)

Lucia Pytter (10 April 1762 - 9 October 1825) was a Norwegian philanthropist. She is known for her social projects in Bergen, Norway and referred to as a pioneer of social work .

== Life ==
Pytter was born at Braksiel near Bremen, Germany. She was the daughter of the German merchant Johann Müller. She was married Martin Görbitz (1738-1796) in 1778, a merchant who operated a profitable trade in manufactured and fashion goods, and established residence in Bergen. They had ten children, among them son Johan Gørbitz, who became a significant artist. After the death of her first spouse, she married Frantz Anton Pytter (1769-1857) in 1801. Both of her spouses were German born merchants who had relocated to Bergen.

On her own initiative and partly with her own funds and efforts, she made sure to provide food, care and medical assistance to many of the city's poor and needy. She had a soup kitchen for 30 poor families every Wednesday, and organized collections for food for the poor. In 1799, she founded a professional handicrafts school and she also founded a leprosy asylum, both for females. She participated in the press in the debate of social issues, and published a work about social care. In consultation with her friend Hans Nielsen Hauge, she also worked to establish a middle school where Christianity would be prioritized. She is also considered to be the author behind the anonymously published collection of poems Svarte-Digen from 1794.

She died after prolonged illness and was buried at St. Mary's Church in Bergen.
