= Palmares Cultural Foundation =

Brazilian state-owned non-governmental organization promoting Afro-Brazilian culture

The Palmares Cultural Foundation (Portuguese: Fundação Cultural Palmares) is a Brazilian state-owned non-governmental organization which promotes Afro-Brazilian culture.

The foundation is a Brazilian public entity linked to the Ministry of Culture, established by Federal Law No. 7,668, of August 22, 1988.

The entity had its Statute approved by Decree nº 418, of January 10, 1992, and its mission is to comply with the constitutional precepts of reinforcing citizenship, identity, action and memory of the ethnic segments of the groups forming Brazilian society, in addition to promoting the right of access to culture and the indispensable action of the State in preserving Afro-Brazilian manifestations.

Article 215 of the 1998 Federal Constitution ensures that the "State will guarantee to everyone the full exercise of cultural rights and access to the sources of national culture, and will support and encourage the appreciation and dissemination of popular, indigenous and Afro-Brazilian cultural manifestations, and other groups participating in the national civilizing process".

The foundation is the initial authority for designating Quilombola communities across Brazil, while the INCRA serves as the final authority for issuing land title to quilombola applicants.

Since 2005, the organization was awarded the Order of Rio Branco, granted by President Luiz Inácio Lula da Silva.

== Presidents ==
Name	Period	President
Carlos Alves Moura	1988 — 1991	José Sarney
Adão Ventura	1991 — 1994	Fernando Collor Itamar Franco
Joel Rufino dos Santos	1994 — 1996	Itamar Franco Fernando Henrique Cardoso
Dulce Pereira	1996 — 2000	Fernando Henrique Cardoso
Carlos Alves Moura	2000 — 2002	Fernando Henrique Cardoso
Ubiratan Castro de Araújo	2003 — 2007	Luiz Inácio Lula da Silva
Zulu Araújo	2007 — 2010	Luiz Inácio Lula da Silva
Eloi Ferreira	2011 — 2013	Dilma Rousseff
Hilton Cobra	2013 — 2015	Dilma Rousseff
Cida Abreu	2015 — 2016	Dilma Rousseff
Erivaldo Oliveira	2016 — 2019	Michel Temer
Vanderlei Lourenço	2019	Jair Bolsonaro
Sérgio Nascimento de Camargo	2019 — 2022	Jair Bolsonaro
Marco Antônio Evangelista da Silva substitute	2022	Jair Bolsonaro
João Jorge Rodriguês	2023 — current	Luiz Inácio Lula da Silva

== See also ==
- Instituto Nacional de Colonização e Reforma Agrária
- List of quilombola territories
- List of quilombola communities in Brazil
