= Ubiratan Castro =

President of the Palmares Cultural Foundation
- In office 21 January 2003 – 07 March 2007
- President: Luiz Inácio Lula da Silva
- Preceded by: Carlos Alves Moura
- Succeeded by: Zulu Araújo

Personal details
- Born: December 22, 1948 Salvador, Bahia, Brazil
- Died: January 3, 2013 (aged 64) Salvador, Bahia, Brazil
- Education: Catholic University of Salvador Federal University of Bahia Paris Nanterre University

Ubiratan Castro de Araújo (22 December 1948 — 3 January 2013) was a Brazilian historian and writer.
