= Cristina de Queiroz =

Brazilian writer

Cristina de Queiroz Leite
- Born: Leme, São Paulo, Brazil
- Died: 2017 (aged 72–73)
- Occupation: Author

Cristina de Queiroz (1944–2017) was a Brazilian writer.

At the age of 30, she won the Jabuti Prize and had one of her texts adapted for the theater in Germany.

She is the author of the short story book "O visitante de verão", which received the 1974 Jabuti Prize, from the Câmara Brasileira do Livro, in the category Author-revelation / adult literature.

The short story "Piano" was published in the short story book "O conto da mulher brasileira", organized by Edla van Steen, Editora Global, 2007.

Her short stories have been published in collections that bring together João Ubaldo Ribeiro, Hilda Hilst, Murilo Rubião among others.

== Bibliography ==
Title	Year	Type	Notes
O Visitande de Verão	1974	Short story book	
Piano	2007	Short story	
