= Lucila Nogueira =

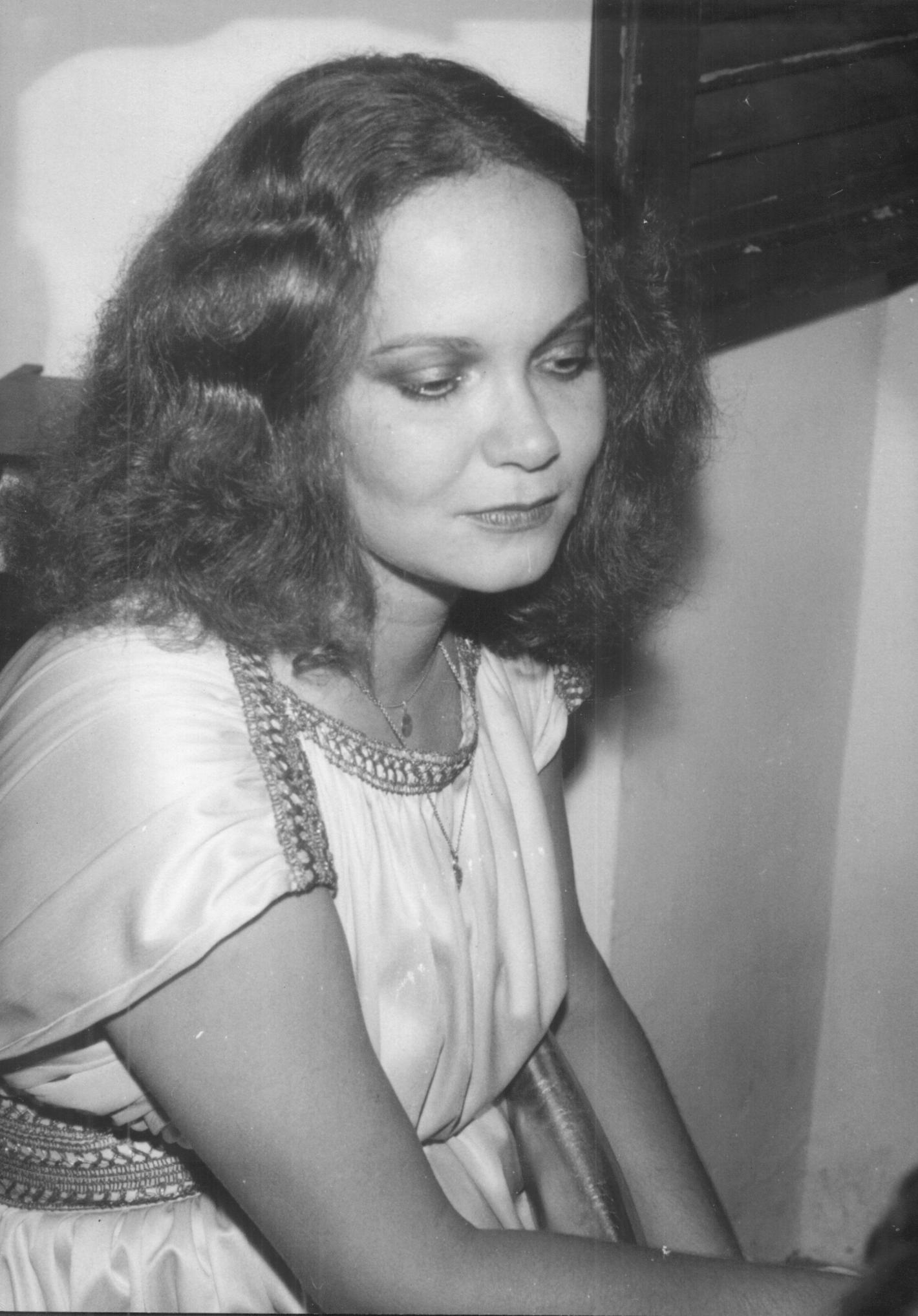
Lucila Nogueira when 20

Lucila Nogueira Rodrigues (March 30, 1950 – December 25, 2016) was a Brazilian poet, essayist, short story writer, educator, and federal prosecutor. Published in 1978, Almenara won the Manuel Bandeira Poetry Prize in Pernambuco. It was the first of the 25 poetry books she was to publish, many of which were translated. Nogueira also published many books of literary criticism and short stories. In 2006, Nogueira was the first woman to represent Brazil at the International Poetry Festival of Medellín. In addition to being a celebrated author, Nogueira was a federal prosecutor, a professor of literature at the Federal University of Pernambuco, a member of the Brazilian Academy of Philology, one of the directors of the Brazilian Union of Writers, and, since 1992, a member of the Pernambuco Academy of Letters and Literature - Academia Pernambucana de Letras.

== Biography ==
Born in Rio de Janeiro, Brazil, on 30 March 1950, Nogueira's ancestors came from Padrón in the Spanish province of Galicia and Régua in Portugal. She studied at the Federal University of Pernambuco where she graduated in law (1972). Thereafter she studied literature, earning a master's degree in 1988 and a PhD under Luzilá Gonçalves Ferreira in 2002.

Lucila Nogueira was married to Sérgio Moacir de Albuquerque, a sociologist, writer and painter of Italian ancestry for 30 years, and had three daughters. Two of her daughters still live in Recife, Brazil, and one of them lives in Europe.

For two of her 25 books of poetry, Almenara and Quasar, she was awarded the Manuel Bandeira poetry prize. She also published several books of literary criticism and short stories. In 2009, she published her last poetry books Tabasco and Casta Maladiva. Zinganares was published in Lisbon in 1998 and launched in the Brazilian Embassy. Her works have been translated into Spanish, French, and English and have been the subject of reviews in Spain, France, Portugal, the United States, and Argentina, among other countries. Nogueira was the literary curator of the Porto de Galinhas International Festival in 2007 and 2008. A member of the Pernambuco Academy of Letters and Literature since 1992, she was also a member the Brazilian Academy of Philology, and one of the directors of the Brazilian Union of Writers.

Lucila Nogueira died in Recife on 25 December 2016.
