= Angelina Soares =

Brazilian feminist, anarchist, and writer

Maria Angelina Soares (1905–1985) was a Brazilian feminist, anarchist, and writer. Her work appeared in anarchist journals, such as A Lanterna, El Libertario, A Voz da União, A Plebe, and A Voz dos Garçons.

== Biography ==
Soares was an anarchist writer and promoter of Brazilian feminist anarchism during the 20th century. She lived in Santos, São Paulo from 1910 to 1914 with her family, where she was introduced to anarchism, partly influenced by her brother Florentino de Carvalho (né Primitivo Raimundo Soares) and partly influenced by her stepmother Paula Soares. She worked as an embroiderer.

In 1914, she returned to São Paulo, living on Calle Bresser in the Brás neighborhood. Here, she actively participated in local anarchist organizations. She began by helping her brother produce and distribute the newspaper, Germinal-La Barricata, which was published in Portuguese and Italian. Then, she taught in libertarian schools, one on Avenida Celso Garcia, and another on Rua de Oriente. Her first article for the anarchist press, "A Guerra" was published in the newspaper A Lanterna, edited by Edgard Leuenroth. She collaborated with the newspaper A Voz da União, produced by Souza Passos, and the newspaper A Voz dos Garçons, edited by Nicolau Parada. She also wrote for "A Plebe" and the magazine Phrometeu, edited by her nephew, Arsênio Palacio, and O Libertário, published by Pedro Cataló in the 1960s. In São Paulo, Angelina also helped found and manage for the Centro Femenino de Educación (Women's Center of Education). In 1923, the Soares family traveled to Rio de Janeiro and took up residence on Rua Maria Jose in the Penha barrio. In Rio, Soares and her sisters Matilde, Antonia, and Pilar formed Grupo Renovação e Música. She died in Rio de Janeiro in 1985.
