= Yde Schloenbach Blumenschein =

Yde (Adelaide) Schloenbach, later Blumenschein by marriage, (26 May 1882 in São Paulo – 14 March 1963 in São Paulo) was a Brazilian poet and chronicler best known as Colombina. She also used the pen name Paula Brasil.

== Career ==
She started writing at the age of 13, and her first poems were published in A Tribuna, a newspaper in the city of Santos. She wrote for magazines and newspapers such as O Malho, Fon-Fon, Careta and Jornal das Moças.

In 1948, she founded the "Casa do Poeta Lampião de Gás", a literary society that initially met in her own home. This society published a monthly newspaper, "O Fanal", of which she was the publisher.

Her poetry is centered on the theme of love, usually treated in a quite innocent way, though some of her poems have a more erotic vein that caused some scandal at her time. Her last book, Rapsódia Rubra - Poemas à Carne ("Red Rapsody - Poems Dedicated to Flesh"), reflects this trend, and its highly erotic poetry was particularly polemical at the time of its publishing.

== Published books ==
- Vislumbres (Sightings), 1908.
- Versos em lá menor (Verses in A minor), 1930.
- Lampião de gás (Gas Lamp), 1937.
- Sândalo (Sandalwood), 1941;
- Uma cigarra cantou para você (A Cicada Sang for You), 1946.
- Distância: poemas de amor e de renúncia (Distance: Poems of Love and Renounce), 1947
- Gratidão (Thankfulness), 1954.
- Para você, meu amor (To You, my Love), 1955.
- Cantares de bem-querer (Songs of Love), 1956.
- Manto de arlequim (Harlequin's Gown), 1956.
- Inverno em flor (Winter in Bloom), 1959.
- Cantigas de luar (Moonshine Songs), 1960.
- Rapsódia rubra - Poemas à Carne (Red Rapsody - Poems Dedicated to Flesh), 1961
