= Cruz e Sousa =

Brazilian poet and journalist

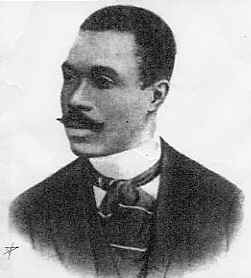
- Born: João da Cruz; November 24, 1861; Florianópolis, Santa Catarina, Empire of Brazil
- Died: March 19, 1898 (aged 36); Antônio Carlos, Minas Gerais, Brazil
- Occupations: Poet, journalist
- Notable work: Broquéis, Faróis, Missal
- Spouse: Gavita Gonçalves
- Parent(s): Guilherme da Cruz; Carolina Eva da Conceição

João da Cruz e Sousa (24 November 1861 – 19 March 1898), also referred to simply as Cruz e Sousa, was a Brazilian poet and journalist, famous for being one of the first Brazilian Symbolist poets. A descendant of African slaves, he has received the epithets of "Black Dante" and "Black Swan".

He is the patron of the 15th chair of the Academia Catarinense de Letras.

== Biography ==
Cruz e Sousa was born João da Cruz on 24 November 1861, in the city of Desterro (present-day Florianópolis), in the province of Santa Catarina. His father was Guilherme da Cruz, a bricklayer, and his mother was Carolina Eva da Conceição – with both of them being freed Afro-Brazilian slaves. Sousa's former owner, Marshal Guilherme Xavier de Sousa, treated him like a close relative, teaching him how to read, write and speak Greek, French and Latin. He also gave João da Cruz his surname Sousa. Cruz e Sousa also studied Mathematics and natural sciences under the guidance of famous German biologist Fritz Müller.

In 1881, Cruz e Sousa served as director of the newspaper Tribuna Popular, where he wrote abolitionist articles. In 1883, Sousa tried to become an attorney for the city of Laguna, but was not accepted for being black. In 1885 he published his first poetry book, Tropos e Fantasias, in partnership with Virgílio Várzea. In 1890 he moved to Rio de Janeiro, where he worked as an archivist at the Estrada de Ferro Central do Brasil. In 1893 he published his two famous books Missal and Broquéis, that introduced the Symbolist movement in Brazil. In November of the same year, he married Gavita Gonçalves, an educated black girl who worked as a seamstress, and had with her four children; however, all four would die prematurely due to tuberculosis, what made Gavita have a mental breakdown and go insane ever since.

Cruz e Sousa died in what is today the city of Antônio Carlos, in the Brazilian state of Minas Gerais, on March 19, 1898, due to tuberculosis.

== Works ==
- Tropos e Fantasias (1885 — in partnership with Virgílio Várzea)
- Broquéis (1893)
- Missal (1893)
- Evocações (1898)
- Faróis (1900 — posthumous)
- Últimos Sonetos (1905 — posthumous)
- O Livro Derradeiro (1945, expanded 1961 — posthumous)
- Dispersos (1961 — posthumous)
