= Maria Firmina dos Reis =

Abolitionist, author

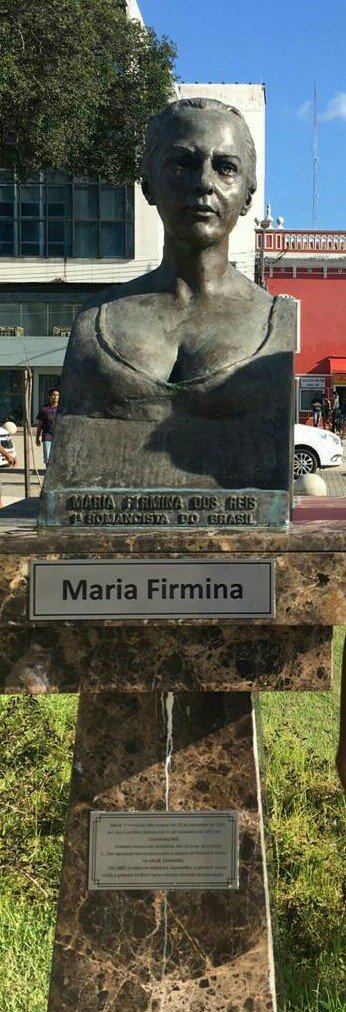
- Sculpture of Maria Firmina dos Reis's portrait
- Born: March 11, 1822; São Luís, Maranhão, Brazil
- Died: November 11, 1917 (aged 92); Guimarães, Maranhão, Brazil
- Writing career
- Pen name: Uma Maranhense
- Notable work: Úrsula (1859)

Maria Firmina dos Reis (March 11, 1822 – November 11, 1917) was a Brazilian author. She is considered Brazil's first black female novelist. In 1859, she published her first book Úrsula, which is considered the first Brazilian abolitionist novel. The book tells the story of a love triangle, in which the system of slavery is put into question.

== Childhood and family ==
Maria Firmina dos Reis was born on São Luís Island, Maranhão, on March 11, 1822, but was baptized on December 21, 1825, due to an illness that she fought during her first few years of life. According to her baptismal record, Maria was baptized in the Parish of Our Lady of Victory in São Luís. Her godparents were claimed as the captain of the militia, João Nogueira de Souza, and "Nossa_Senhora_dos_Remédios". The record did not state her date of birth of parents. On June 25, 1847, After enrolling in the public contest for the primary education course in the village of Guimarães, which was only possible for those 25 years old or older, Maria Firmina requested a new baptismal justification certificate, in which she informed that her date of birth was March 11, 1822, and that her mother was Leonor Felipa. Leonor had been the slave of Commander Caetano José Teixeira, who died in 1819, a great merchant and landowner in the village of São José de Guimarães, owner of a commercial company with large transactions at the end of the colonial period and at the beginning of the Empire of Brazil.

Both the baptismal record and the 1847 certificate omit the name of Maria Firmina's father, which was only declared on her death certificate, dated November 17, 1917, with the name João Pedro Esteves. João Pedro Esteves, a wealthy man, was a partner of the former owner of Maria Firmina's mother, the slave Leonor Felipa, in his trading company.

According to some sources, she is the cousin of the Maranhão writer Francisco Sotero dos Reis on her mother's side, although it is not known on what basis and to what degree.

In 1830, Maria moved with her family to the village of São José de Guimarães, on the mainland. She lived part of her life in the house of a better-off maternal aunt. In 1847, she ran for the chair of Primary education and being approved, she exercised her profession there as a teacher of Elementary school from 1847 to 1881. Maria Firmina dos Reis never married.

== Career ==
In 1859, she published the novel Úrsula, which is considered the first novel published by a Brazilian woman. In 1887, she published her short story "A escrava" (the slave) in the Revista maranhense. This short story follows an active participant of the abolitionist movement.

At 54 years old and after working 34 years as a professor, Maria Firmina founded, in Marcarico, a few kilometers from Guimaraes, a free and mixed school for students who could not pay. She taught classes in a shack on a plantation, and drove to the lesson every morning in a driven cart. There, she taught the plantation owner's daughters, students she took with her, and others that joined the class. Norma Telles, an academic, called Maria Firmina's initiative "a bold experiment for the time period". This innovative action lasted until the first meeting of the lutas das feministas brasileiras ('the fights of the Brazilian feminists') near the end of the 19th century, which advocated for equality in the education available to young women in Brasil.

Maria Firma dos Reis was very active in the intellectual community of Maranhão: she worked with local press, published books, participated in various anthologies, was a musician and songwriter, and abolitionist. When she received her position as professor, at 22 years old, her mother wanted her to take a carriage carried by enslaved people to the ceremony, but she decided to walk, saying, "Black people are not an animal to ride upon". She also wrote the hymn of abolition "no longer slaves".

In 1863, she described herself as "shy and have a weak complexion", and, because of this "could not help but be a fragile, timid, and by consequence, a melancholy creature". At 85 years old, those who knew her would describe her as small, mixed race, round faced, dark eyes, with curly grey hair. A student of hers described her as an energetic professor that spoke quietly and wouldn't punish students harshly, often preferring to counsel than scold. She was reserved, but willing to be open with those around her. She was held in high esteem by her students and by those that lived in the village: every parade in Guimaraes made a stop at her door to cheer, to which she would give an impromptu speech.

== Life and work ==
Maria Firmina dos Reis was born in São Luís, Maranhão, Brazil. "At age five, her mother and relatives moved to Viamão where she attended school. In 1847, due to outstanding performance, she won a scholarship for further studies at the level of "cadeira de primeiras letras" that prepared her to be a teacher". She maintained the profession "until her retirement in 1881". "At the age of fifty-five, she founded a school for poor children."

In 1859, Firmina dos Reis published her single major novel Úrsula (the same year, Harriet Wilson published her Our Nig).

Úrsula, the main character, is a weak and sweet girl with whom two men are in love: one is a good person, the other a villain. Úrsula is expected to fall in love with the good man. However, she falls for the villain and becomes a victim of his cruelty. She is condemned and mistreated for having made the wrong choice. Reis shows through her characters that whenever women and slaves deviate from the established rules of the patriarchal system or refuse to accept the rules of society, they are punished. Furthermore, Úrsula, her mother, and some female slaves are portrayed from an inside perspective, showing a truthful historical point of view from Colonial Brazil.

Besides Úrsula, "Firmina dos Reis wrote poetry and short stories. While still in her twenties she began to collaborate with several local newspapers in her hometown of São Luis, an activity she sustained for many years. It was the only opening available for getting her works published." She also "wrote an intimate, melancholic diary written dating from 1853 to 1903 in which the themes of regilious self-denial, death, and suicide recur". In 1975 by the Brazilian scholars Antônio de Oliveira and Nascimento Morais Filho recovered the long forgotten Úrsula 1975 in a facsimile edition.

As a "privileged free black woman within nineteenth-century colonial slave society", Maria Firmina dos Reis "stands out because she was very well-educated and a vigorous opponent of slavery". Dawn Duke considers Maria Firmina dos Reis, together with Cuban writer María Dámasa Jova Baró, "as eminent precursors to a distinguished line of subsequent women writers" in the Afro-Latin American context. "Horácio de Almeida believed Maria Firmina dos Reis to be the first Brazilian woman writer. [...] Luiza Lobo has since opposed the allegation by presenting Ana Eurídice Eufrosina de Barandas of Porto Alegre as the first female Brazilian novelist." But the "long-term symbolic value of Maria Firmina dos Reis's only novel Úrsula (1859) rests in its distinction as a work that lays the foundations for an Afro-Brazilian female literary consciousness." For Rita Terezinha Schmidt, "Maria Firmina dos Reis inscribes a black voice in the construction of national subjectivities engendering what Homi Bhabha defines as a counter narrative of the nation that 'continually evoke and erase its totalizing boundaries – both actual and conceptual – disturb those ideological maneuvers through which "imagined communities" are given essentialist identities'".

In her PhD thesis Life Among the Living Dead, Carolyn Kendrick-Alcantara (2007) analyzes "the Gothic as a powerful abolitionist discourse in Brazil and Cuba through [her] readings of Maria Firmina dos Reis′ Ursula and Gertrudis Gomez de Avellaneda y Arteaga′s Sab".

== Death and legacy ==
Maria Firmina dos Reis died, blind and poor, at the age of 95, in the house of a previously enslaved woman: Mariazinha, who had fostered one of dos Reis' children. A biography about her was written by author Jarid Arraes as part of her 2015 cordel collection and book Heroínas Negras Brasileiras em 15 cordéis. Maria Firmina dos Reis was honored in a Google Doodle on the 11th of October in 2019, on what was thought of as her birthdate, but was later proven to be her baptismal date. On June 9, 2021, Google announced on their Google Cloud blog that they will name a new undersea cable that is being constructed between Brazil and the United States after her. She is the only woman represented among the busts of important writers from Maranhão at the Praça do Pantheon ('Pantheon Square') in São Luís.

== Works ==
Conceição Evaristo defines "escrevivência", or what can best be described in English as writing from personal experience, in three components: the writing of the body, of a condition and of a black experience in Brazil. The first element that composes writing, the body, refers to the subjective dimension of black existence, being an archive of impressions throughout life, marked on the skin and in the constant struggle for the affirmation and reversal of stereotypes. The condition of the black woman, the second element, highlights several problems inherited from the colonial situation, since, through slavery, women were subjugated in different areas. The writing experience of Maria Firmina dos Reis, a black writer, can also be perceived in the representation of her black characters, as the history of literature directly influences nationality and, consequently, also in the construction of the image of genres, a means used to consolidate the male power.

Maria Firmina presents black people in her novels, giving them human dimensions and gives a position as a subject of discourse, which can reveal an intimate identification with the enslaved black person, presenting a solidarity that, in the words of Eduardo de Assis Duarte, "is born from a perspective another, through which the writer, sister to the captives and their descendants, expresses, through fiction, her belonging to this universe of culture".

== List of works ==
This selection was acquired from the book Escritores brasileiras do século XIX: Antologia (Brazilian writers from the 19th century: an anthology).

- Úrsula. Novel 1859
- Gupeva, Novel, 1861;1862 (O jardim dos Maranhenses) and 1863 (Porta Livre e Eco da Juventude)
- Poems in: Parnase maranhense, 1861
- A escrava (The enslaved woman). Short story, 1887 ( A Revista Maranhense n° 3)
- Cantos à beira-mar. Poems, 1871.
- Hino da libertação dos escravos. 1888.
- Poems in: A Imprensa, Publicador Maranhense; A Verdadeira Marmota; Almanaque de Lembranças Brasileiras; Eco da Juventude; Semanário Maranhense; O Jardim dos Maranhenses; Porto Livre; O Domingo; O País; A Revista Maranhense; Diário do Maranhão; Pacotilha; Federalista.
- Musical compositions: Auto de bumba-meu-boi (music and lyrics); Valsa (lyrics written by Gonçalves Dias and music written by Maria Firmina dos Reis); Hino à Mocidade (music and lyrics); Hino à liberdade dos escravos (music and lyrics); Rosinha, valsa (music and lyrics); Pastor estrela do oriente (music and lyrics); Canto de recordação ("à Praia de Cumã"; music and lyrics).

== See also ==
- History of education in Brazil
- Maria de Lima das Mercês

== Bibliography ==
=== By Maria Firmina dos Reis ===
- Ursula, "Romance original brasileiro, por Uma Maranhense". São Luís: Typographia Progresso, 1859. 199 pages.

- Facsimile: Maranhão: Governo do Estado; 2nd edition, 1975, with a foreword by Horácio de Almeida. OCLC 2403003
- Reprint: Rio de Janeiro: Presença; Brasília: INL, 1988; with an introduction by Charles Martin, updated and annotated by Luiza Lobo, Coleção Resgate. ISBN 8525200352

- Gupeva, "romance brasileiro indianista". Published in O jardim dos Maranhenses, 1861/62.

This novel was republished in 1863 in the journal Porto Livre, as well as in the literary review Eco da Juventude.
Transcripted in: FILHO, José Nascimento Morais. Maria Firmina – Fragmentos de uma vida. Maranhão: Imprensa do Governo do Maranhão, 1975. OCLC 762780691

- A Escrava. Story published in A Revista Maranhense, nr. 3, 1887.

Republished in: FILHO, José Nascimento Morais. Maria Firmina – Fragmentos de uma vida. Maranhão: Imprensa do Governo do Maranhão, 1975. OCLC 762780691

- Cantos à beira-mar. Poetry. São Luís do Maranhão: Typographia do Paiz. Reprint by "M.F.V. Pires", 1871. OCLC 420181658

- 2nd edition, facsimile, by José Nascimento Morais Filho: Rio de Janeiro: Granada, 1976. OCLC 494335967

- Hino da libertação dos escravos. 1888.
- Maria Firmina dos Reis is included in the poetry anthology Parnaso maranhense: collecção de poesias, edited by Flávio Reimar and Antonio Marques Rodrigues. OCLC 492474114
- She published poems in the following literary journals: Federalista; Pacotilha; Diário do Maranhão; A Revista Maranhense; O País; O Domingo; Porto Livre; O Jardim dos Maranhenses; Semanário Maranhense; Eco da Juventude; Almanaque de Lembranças Brasileiras; A Verdadeira Marmota; Publicador Maranhense; y A Imprensa.

=== English translations ===
- Ursula. Trans. and Introduction by Cristina Ferreira Pinto-Bailey. Dartmouth, MA: Tagus P, 2021.
- "The Slave Woman." Trans. and Introduction by Cristina Ferreira Pinto-Bailey. Afro-Hispanic Review. 32. 1 (Spring 2013): 209–18.

=== Selected further reading ===
- Alzira Rufino; Nilza Iraci; Maria Rosa Pereira. A mulher negra tem história. Santos, SP: Coletivo de Mulheres Negras da Baixada Santista, c. 1986. OCLC 22776073
- Souza Dorea, Alfredo (1995), "Maria Firmina dos Reis, negra memória do Maranhão", Cadernos do Ceas, Salvador da Bahia, ISSN 0102-9711, OCLC 1490971
- Duke, Dawn (2008), "Textual hybridity in Maria Firmina dos Reis's "Úrsula"", Literary Passion, Ideological Commitment: Toward a Legacy of Afro-Cuban and Afro-Brazilian Women Writers, Associated University Presses, pp. 59–75, ISBN 978-0838757062, OCLC 185021522

== Notes ==
=== Works cited ===
- Priore, Mary del; Pinsky, Carla Bassanezi, eds. (2012). História das mulheres no Brasil (in Portuguese) (10ª ed.). São Paulo: Contexto. ISBN 978-85-7244-256-5.
- Muzart, Zahidé Lupinacci, ed. (1999). Escritoras brasileiras do século XIX: Antologia (in Portuguese). Florianópolis/Santa Cruz so Sul: Editora Mulheres/EDUNISC. ISBN 85-86501-09-3.
