= Afro-Brazilian history =

The history of Afro-Brazilian people spans over five centuries of racial interaction between Africans imported, involved or descended from the effects of the Atlantic slave trade.

== African origins ==
The Africans brought to Brazil belonged to two major groups: the West African and the Bantu people.

The West African people (previously known as Sudanese, and without connection with Sudan) were sent in large scale to Bahia. They mostly belong to the Ga-Adangbe, Yoruba, Igbo, Fon, Ashanti, Ewe, Mandinka, and other West African groups native to Guinea, Ghana, Benin, Guinea-Bissau and Nigeria. The Bantus were brought from Angola, Congo region and Mozambique and sent in large scale to Rio de Janeiro, Minas Gerais, and the Northeastern Brazil.

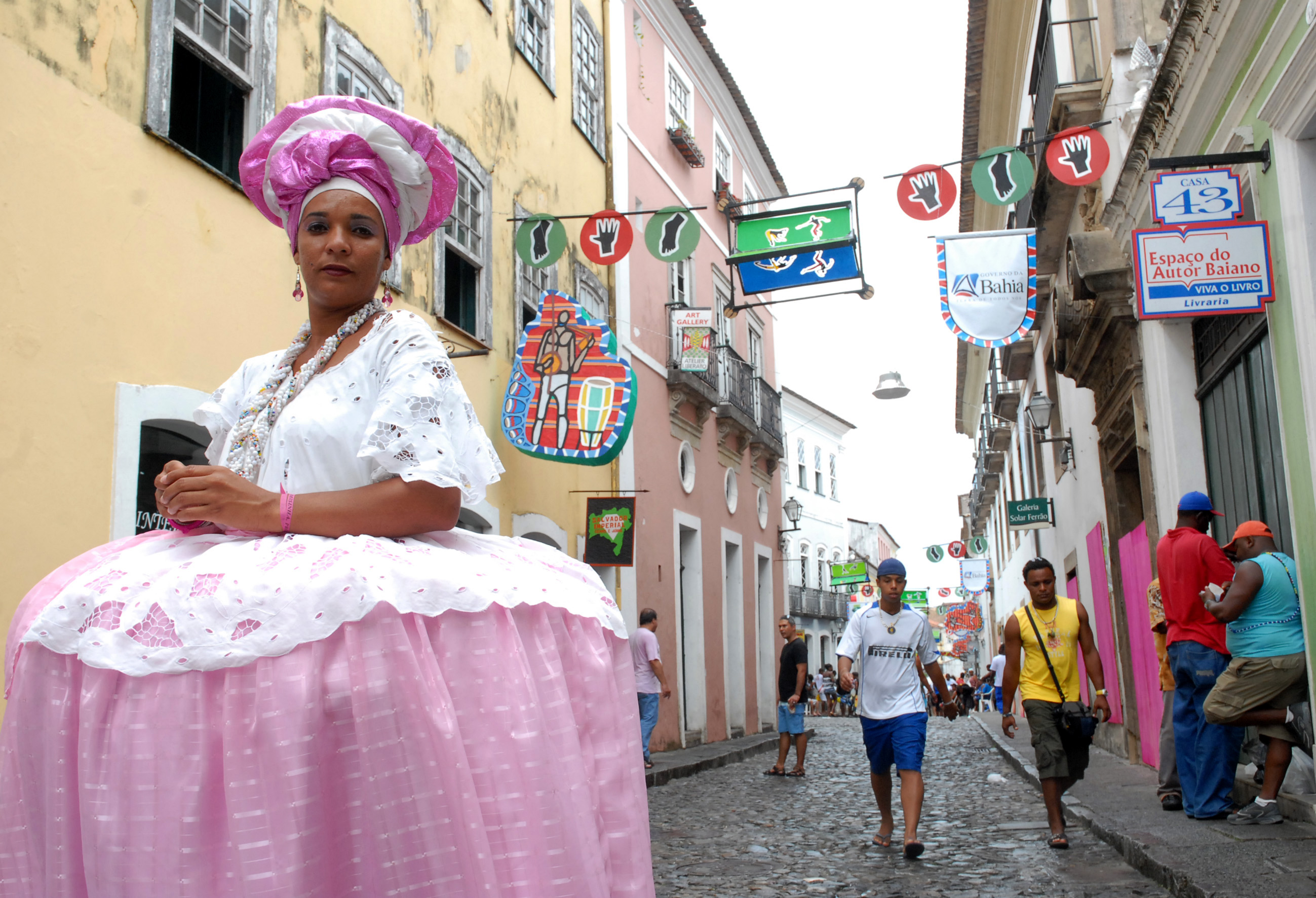
The typical dress of women from Bahia has clear Muslim influences.

The Africans brought to Brazil were from different ethnicities and from different African regions. Gilberto Freyre noted the major differences between these groups. Some Sudanese peoples, such as Hausa, Fula and others were Islamic, spoke Arabic and many of them could read and write in this language. Freyre noted that many slaves were better educated than their masters, because many Muslim slaves were literate in Arabic, while many Portuguese Brazilian masters could not even read or write in Portuguese. These slaves of greater Arab and Berber influence were largely sent to Bahia. Even today the typical dress of the women from Bahia has clear Muslim influences, as the use of the Arabic turban on the head.

Despite the large influx of Islamic slaves, most of the slaves in Brazil were brought from the Bantu regions of the Atlantic coast of Africa where today Congo and Angola are located, and also from Mozambique. In general, these people lived in tribes. The people from Congo had developed agriculture, raised livestock, domesticated animals such as goat, pig, chicken and dog and produced sculptures in wood. Some groups from Angola were nomadic and did not know agriculture.

Estimated disembarkment of Africans in Brazil from 1781 to 1855
Period	Place of arrival			
Period	Total in Brazil	South of Bahia	Bahia	North of Bahia
Total period	2.113.900	1.314.900	409.000	390.000
1781–1785	63.100	34.800	...	28.300
1786–1790	97.800	44.800	20.300	32.700
1791–1795	125.000	47.600	34.300	43.100
1796–1800	108.700	45.100	36.200	27.400
1801–1805	117.900	50.100	36.300	31.500
1806–1810	123.500	58.300	39.100	26.100
1811–1815	139.400	78.700	36.400	24.300
1816–1820	188.300	95.700	34.300	58.300
1821–1825	181.200	120.100	23.700	37.400
1826–1830	250.200	176.100	47.900	26.200
1831–1835	93.700	57.800	16.700	19.200
1836–1840	240.600	202.800	15.800	22.000
1841–1845	120.900	90.800	21.100	9.000
1846–1850	257.500	208.900	45.000	3.600
1851–1855	6.100	3.300	1.900	900
Note: "South of Bahia" means "from Espírito Santo to Rio Grande do Sul" States; "North of Bahia" means "from Sergipe to Amapá States"

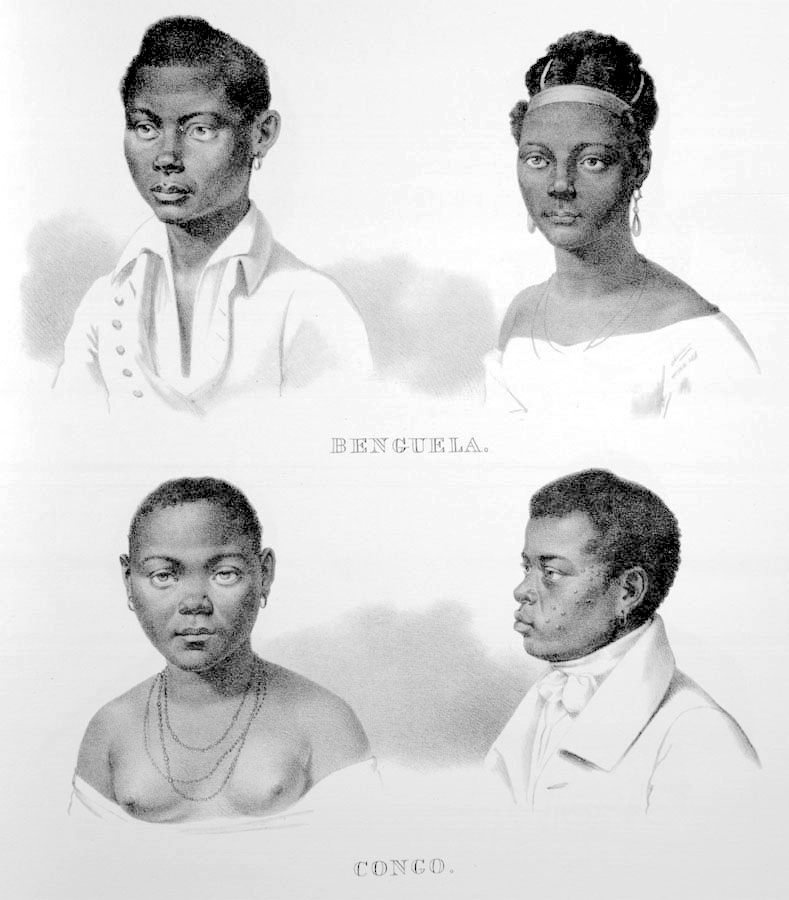
African slaves from Benguela and Congo

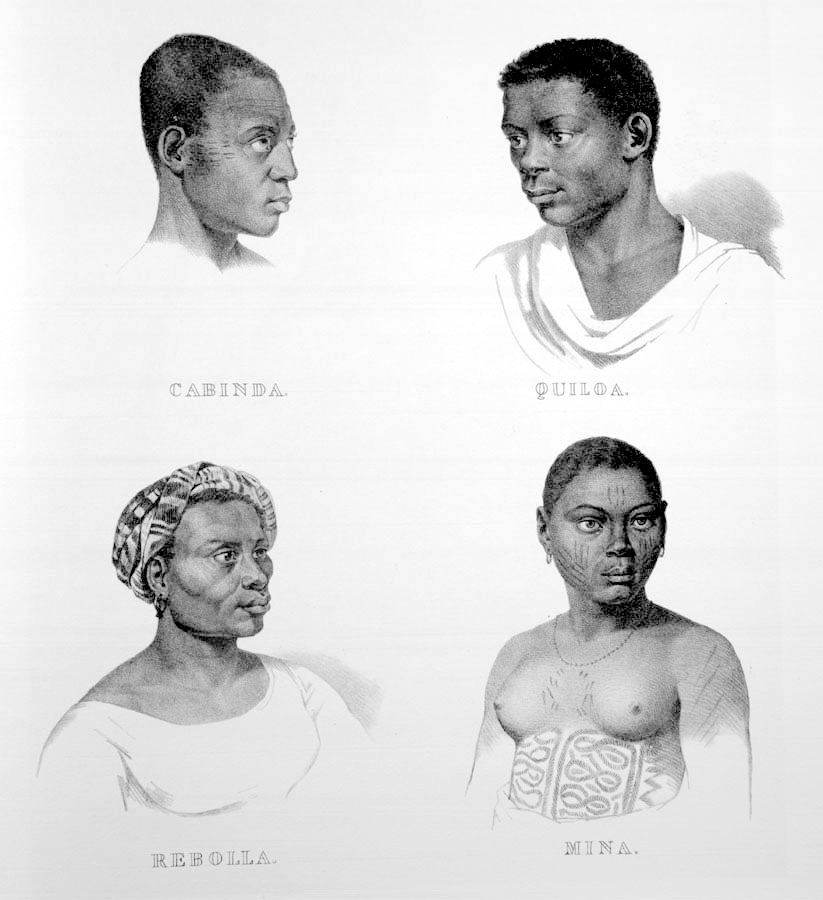
African slaves from Cabinda, Kilwa, Rebolo and Elmina

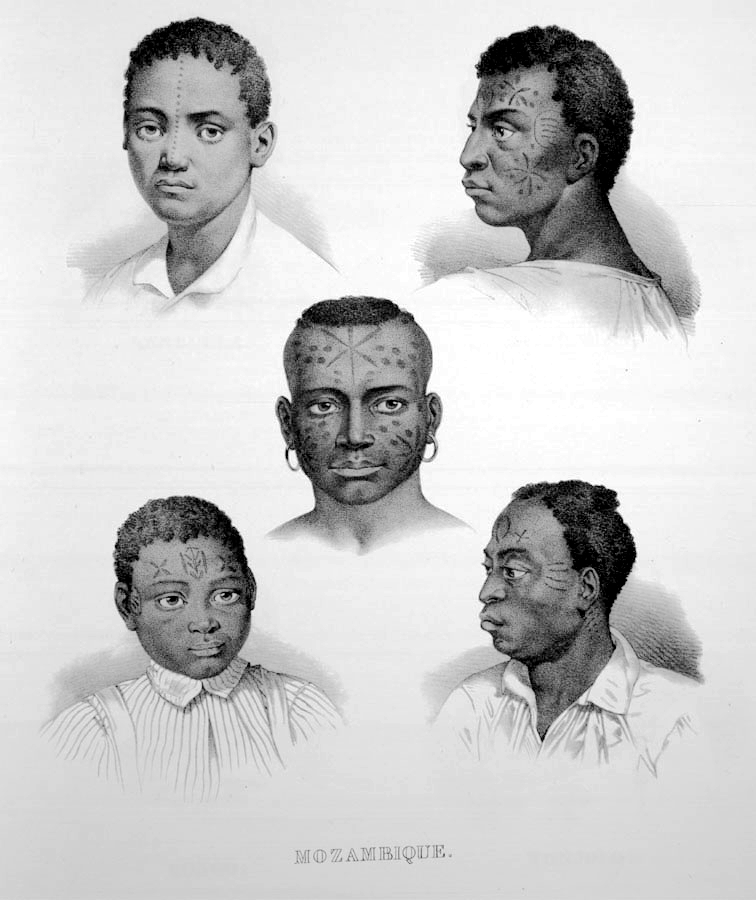
African slaves from Mozambique

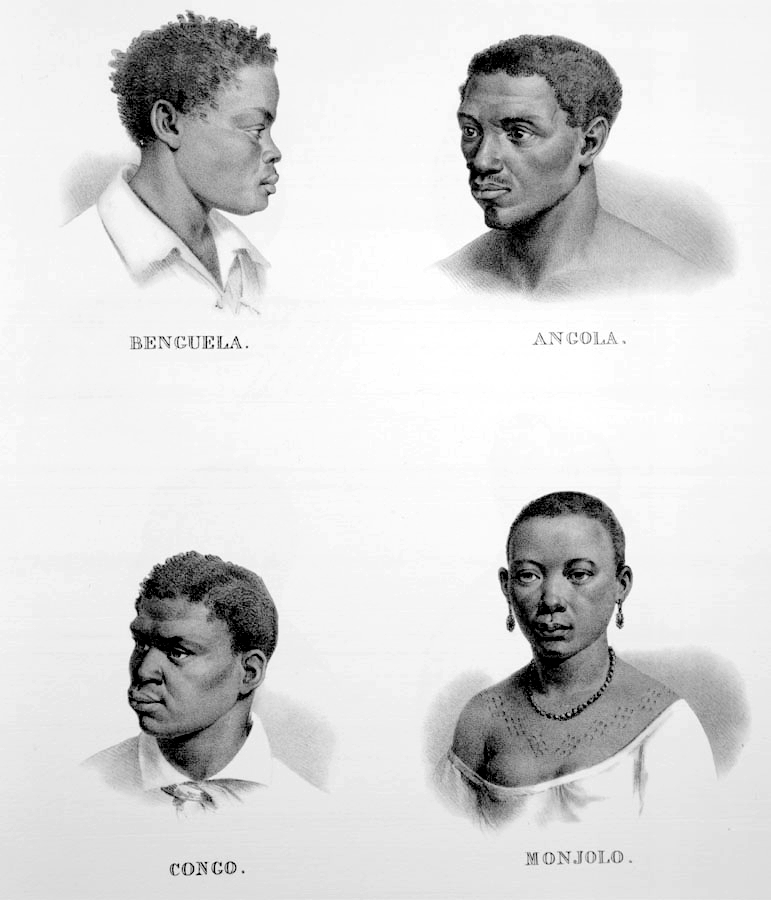
African slaves from Benguela, Angola, Congo and Monjolo

== The travel ==
Slave trade was a huge business that involved hundreds of ships and thousands of people in Brazil and Africa. There were officers on the coast of Africa that sold the slaves to hundreds of small regional dealers in Brazil. In 1812, half of the thirty richest merchants of Rio de Janeiro were slave traders. The profits were huge: in 1810 a slave purchased in Luanda for 70,000 réis was sold in the District of Diamantina, Minas Gerais, for up to 240,000 réis. With taxes, the state collected a year the equivalent of 18 million reais with the slave trade. In Africa, people were kidnapped as prisoners of war or offered as payment of tribute to a tribal chief. The merchants, who were black Africans too, took the slaves to the coast where they would be purchased by agents of the Portuguese slave traders. Until the early 18th century such purchases were made with smuggled gold. In 1703, Portugal banned the use of gold for this purpose. Since then, they started to use products of the colony, such as textiles, tobacco, sugar and cachaça to buy the slaves.

In Africa, about 40% of blacks died in the route between the areas of capture and the African coast. Another 15% died in the ships crossing the Atlantic Ocean between Africa and Brazil. From the Atlantic coast the journey could take from 33 to 43 days. From Mozambique it could take as many as 76 days. Once in Brazil from 10 to 12% of the slaves also died in the places where they were taken to be bought by their future masters. In consequence, only 45% of the Africans captured in Africa to become slaves in Brazil survived. Darcy Ribeiro estimated that, in this process, some 12 million Africans were captured to be brought to Brazil, even though the majority of them died before becoming slaves in the country.

== Slavery in Brazil ==
Brazil obtained 37% of all African slaves traded, and close to 4 million slaves were sent to this one country. Starting around 1550, the Portuguese began to trade African slaves to work the sugar plantations once the native Tupi people deteriorated. During the colonial epoch, slavery was a mainstay of the Brazilian economy, especially in mining and sugar cane production.

Muslim slaves, known as Malê in Brazil, produced one of the greatest slave revolts in the Americas, when in 1835 they tried to take the control of Salvador, Bahia. The event was known as the Malê Revolt.

== Abolition of slavery ==
The Clapham Sect, a group of Victorian Evangelical politicians, campaigned during most of the 19th century for England to use its influence and power to stop the traffic of slaves to Brazil. Besides moral qualms, Brazilian slavery hampered the development of markets for British products, which was a main concern of British government and civil society. This combination led to intensive pressure from the British government for Brazil to end this practice, which it did by steps over several decades. Slavery was legally ended May 13 by the Lei Áurea ("Golden Law") of 1888.

== Post-slavery ==
By the time of slavery's end, Afro-Brazilians faced a number of cultural challenges, both state-sponsored and societal. Among them, a long-established discriminatory immigration policy made sure that previously large minorities of the African ex-slaves and large majorities of them and their direct descendants, mainly in Southern and Southeastern Brazil, were already being replaced by white European immigrants, from many origins; this was furthered by a national doctrine of racial "whitening" (or Portuguese: branqueamento), whereby miscegenation was encouraged by the state to breed out the darkest-skinned Afro-Brazilians. Besides the immigration and natal policies, the state, under President Fonseca in 1890, also revived a slavery-era ban on capoeira which lasted until the 1930s under dictator Getúlio Vargas. There was also a ban on Afro-Brazilian religions, and the first criminalization of cannabis use in Brazil was due to its association with the culture of the African slaves. Overpopulation caused uncontrolled rural exodus and urbanization and lack of infrastructure to assist the masses combined of the perpetuation of historical racial discrimination resulted in the contemporary enormous social problems caused by income disparities seen even nowadays in Brazil, which led to other negative stereotypes about the Afro-Brazilians perpetuating their condition as social outcasts.

The end of the Brazilian dictatorship in 1985 brought much more civil liberties and eventually the criminalization of racist propaganda, humiliation, harassment and discrimination; but there are still many important issues such as income gap, wage disparity, social perpetuation of racial stereotypes, crime and police brutality, sexism and religious intolerance (which can be even led by Afro-Brazilian Protestants themselves against followers of Afro-Brazilian religions).

== The Politics of Culture Post-Abolition Salvador ==
In Salvador post-abolition Brazil, there was racial and cultural segregation between the white and African communities which helped to reveal the underlying notions of power and hegemony that existed at the time. The white population had power over Salvador's slave society and assumed the economic and socio-political roles that the African black population played.Even post-abolition, the white elites with the support of the legal system and the military system were determined to make European-based culture the dominion. Despite this, alternatively, abolition provided an avenue for the black population to fully express their respective African identities as well as acknowledge and engage in a blend of all the existing African cultures. They were able to do this as they were in the majority as compared to the white population. "African" or the black population at the time in Brazil did not only characterize those who were born in Africa but also the descendants of the "African- borns" who were born in Brazil.

Due to the removal of the slave status and property requirements for the black population, it resulted in the formal equality of the white and black population. It then become crucial for the white and elite population to create different ways of postulating claims of superiority over the black population. Nevertheless, this post emancipation period emphasized a display of Afro-Bahians to express their culture by occupying public spaces. For instance, on the 13th of May 1888 when Princess Isabel signed the Abolition Law, there were annual celebrations of Candomblé, Maculêlê and Samba de roda. These traditions became a part of Carnival celebrations. The Embaixada Africana also become a place of perpetuating African origins during the 1890s. In order to clamp down some of these celebrations, the white elites started a campaign of civilization against barbarism using the police system to ban parades with African costumes and batuques from 1905 to 1913. The police also tried to prevent and reduce the practice of Afro-Brazilian culture like candomblé shrines and terreiros were invaded and sacred objects were confiscated. Terreiros serve as symbolic religious places for Afro-Brazilians to represent and express their respective African identities. Terreiros are simply areas that coexists as a place and the religious group it pertains to.

Capoeira was also another cultural tradition by Afro-Bahians that the white elites' tried to eradicate mainly because they occurred in public spaces. Capoeira or vadiação in the 20th century could have been played anytime or anywhere especially during breaks in the workplace, in squares during the annual cycles of religious celebrations and on Sundays in popular neighborhoods. Capoeira was a male-dominated activity as it was men in occupations such as sailors, stevedores and porters which required great use of physical strength who played capoeira as a break from their strenuous activities at work. Despite capoeira being male dominated, some women used capoeira as a means of resisting the police and this gender disparity made these women be seen as troublemakers rather than players in the capoeira roda.

== Cultural revival ==
Beginning in the 1970s, in the midst of the military dictatorship, Afro-Brazilians were inspired by the previous decade of the Civil Rights Movement in the United States. This was first evidenced in the incorporation of funk, soul music and Jamaican reggae with samba and increasingly political lyrics to create hybrid genres of popular music in Brazil, but by the 1980s, a more ethnically aware political movement, aligned both with the Black Power movement in the United States and the Caribbean as well as the Pan-African movement in Africa, developed through such ideologues as Abdias do Nascimento. Today, a plethora of social, cultural and political organizations have been organized to draw attention to racially aggravated ills caused by past government policies and social practices and the Brazilian government took a more proactive stance on ethnic and racial diversity under President Lula da Silva. The Special Secretariat for Policies to Promote Racial Equality was created as government agency in Brazil. The agency has been headed by Luiza Helena de Bairros and Edson Santos. It was created in 2003 during the first Lula government, but demoted to national secretariat during the Michel Temer government.

== See also ==
- Atlantic slave trade to Brazil
- Brazil–Nigeria relations
- Valongo Wharf
- Quilombo
- African American history
- Afro-Brazilian culture
