= Nilma Lino Gomes =

Brazilian professor, researcher and university administrator

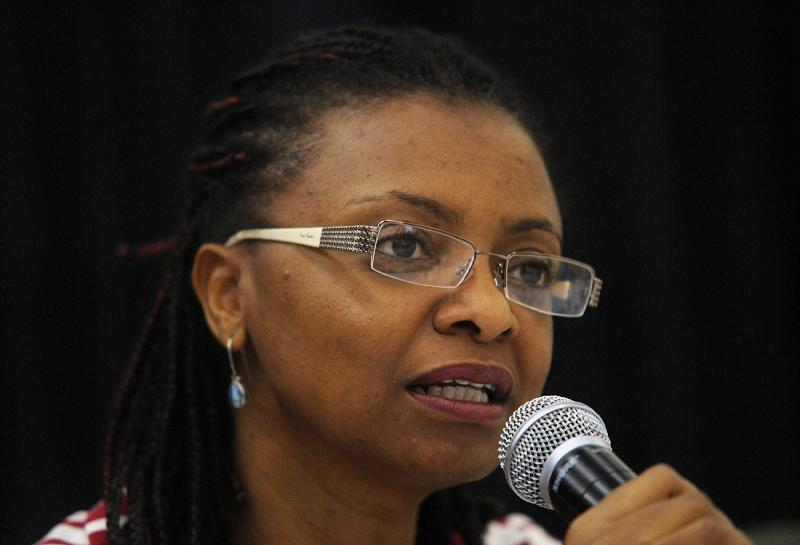
- Nilma Lino Gomes in 2010

Minister of Women, Racial Equality and Human Rights
- In office 2 October 2015 – 12 May 2016
- Preceded by: Pepe Vargas (as Minister of Human Rights and Citizenship)
- Succeeded by: Luislinda Valois (as Minister of Human Rights)

Minister of Racial Equality
- In office 1 January 2015 – 2 October 2015
- Preceded by: Luiza Helena de Bairros
- Succeeded by: Anielle Franco (2023)

Personal details
- Born: Nilma Lino Gomes; 1961 (age 64–65) Belo Horizonte, Minas Gerais, Brazil
- Education: Federal University of Minas Gerais; University of São Paulo (PhD); University of Coimbra
- Occupation: Professor, researcher, and university administrator

Nilma Lino Gomes (born 1961) is a Brazilian professor, researcher, and university administrator recognized for her commitment to education, diversity, and racial equality.

She was the first Black woman in Brazil to lead a public federal university after having been named rector of the University for International Integration of the Afro-Brazilian Lusophony (UNILAB) in 2013. This appointment represented a symbolic and historic milestone in Brazilian higher education, marking a significant step forward for the representation of Black women in the country’s academic institutions.

On 2 October 2015, she was nominated by president Dilma Rousseff to be the first minister of the recently created Ministry of Women, Racial Equality, and Human Rights, which brought together the secretaries of the Policies for Women, Racial Equality, and Human Rights and parts of the General Secretariat. Prior to the merger, she had been the Minister of Racial Equality. She remained in the position until the temporary removal and then impeachment of Dilma by the Federal Senate.

She signed a manifesto in defense of national sovereignty and against recent statements by U.S. President Donald Trump, rejecting the attempted foreign interference in Brazil’s judicial system and denouncing the political nature of the U.S. decision to raise import tariffs on Brazilian products by 50%.

== Career ==
Gomes, a native of Belo Horizonte, graduated with a degree in pedagogy from the Federal University of Minas Gerais (UFMG) in 1988. She later earned a master's degree in education from UFMG in 1994, under the advisory of Eliane Marta Santos Teixeira Lopes with the dissertation titled "The educational trajectory of Black teachers and its incidence in the construction of racial identity - A case study in a municipal school of Belo Horizonte". She later pursued and completed a doctorate in anthropology from the University of São Paulo (USP) in 2002, under the advisory of Kabengele Munanga with the thesis titled Body and Hair as Icons in the Construction of Beauty and Racial Identity in the Ethnic Salons of Belo Horizonte. She is a Research Productivity Fellow in education at CNPq.

From 2004 to 2006, she was the president of the Brazilian Association of Black Researchers (ABPN). Following this, she moved to Portugal, where, in 2006, she did post-doctorate research in sociology at the University of Coimbra.

She was a member of the Chamber of Basic Education for the National Council of Education from 2010 to 2014, where she participated in the national technical commission of diversity for subjects relation to the education of Black Brazilians. As a counselor, she issued an opinion on the book Caçadas de Pedrinho by Monteiro Lobato. In said opinion, she declared that the content of the book depicted racist stereotypes of Black people and Africans in a sweeping manner. The opinion also contained suggestions of guidelines so that the novel would not be used to normalize racist discourse in Brazil. She participated in the judging commission for the 2003-2004 edition of the Paulo Freire Prize of the Municipality of Belo Horizonte.

She coordinated the affirmative action programs at UFMG, where she also taught pedagogy. In 2013, she was named rector of UNILAB, becoming the first Black woman to lead a public federal university in Brazil.

=== SEPPIR ===
In December 2014, it was officially announced as the future chief minister of the Special Secretariat for Policies to Promote Racial Equality (SEPPIR/PR) for the second term of Dilma Rousseff. She assumed the position on 2 January 2015.

"SEPPIR has a challenging political and educational role, since it has a pedagogical character and needs to focus in a structured and educative manner in an alteration of the impacts that hit at these for various reasons, among these sexual orientation. It is necessary to build a new administration with the largest number of views about the new challenge that is being set up to combat racism in Brazil."

— Nilma Lino Gomes, during her speech while taking office.

== Awards ==
- Carolina Bori Ciência & Mulher prize in the Humanities category, awarded by the Sociedade Brasileira para o Progresso da Ciência (SBPC).
