= Anielle Franco =

Brazilian politician (born 1985)

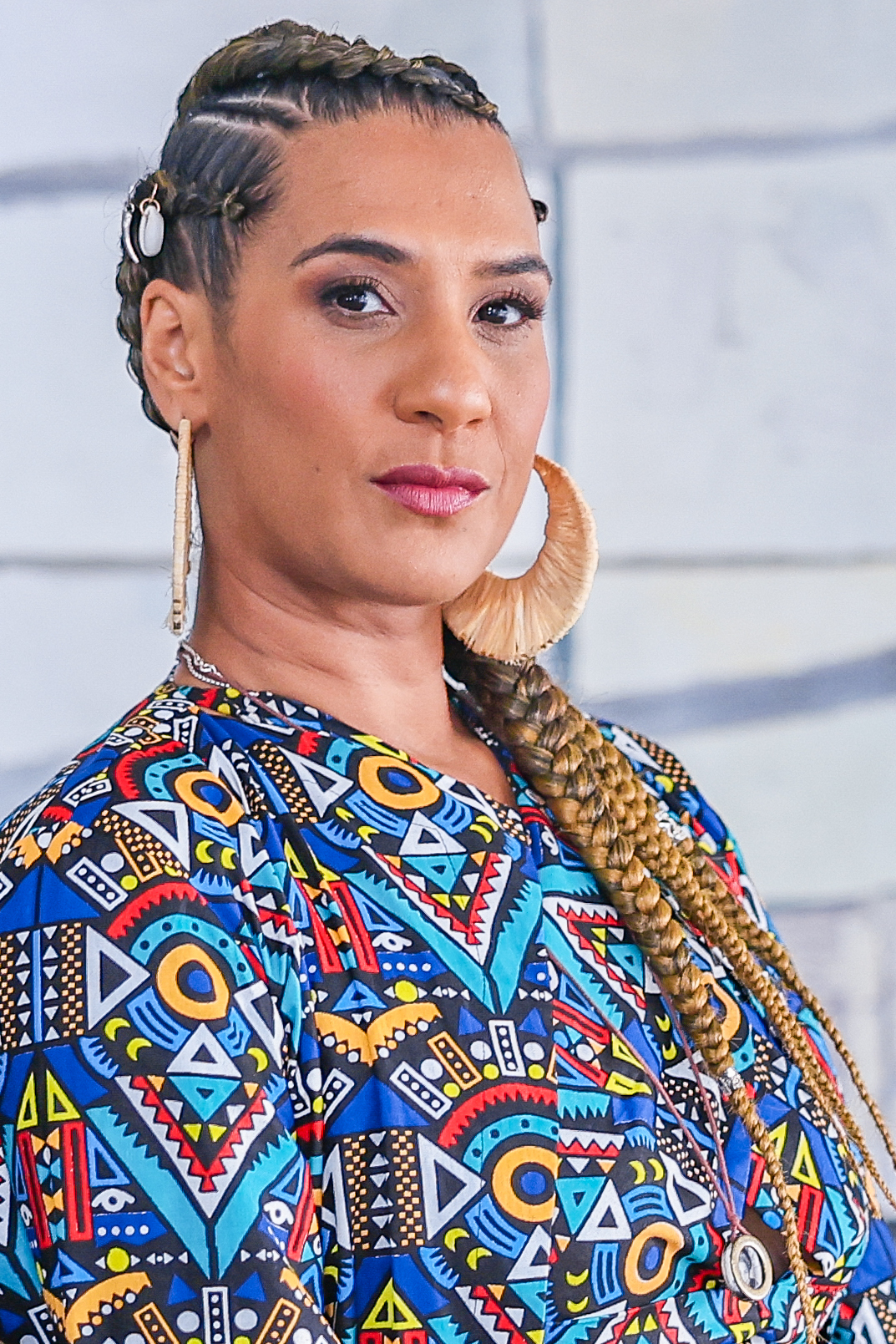
- Franco in 2023

Member-elect of the Chamber of Deputies
- Assuming office 1 February 2027
- Constituency: Rio de Janeiro

Minister of Racial Equality
- In office 1 January 2023 – 1 April 2026
- President: Luiz Inácio Lula da Silva
- Preceded by: Nilma Lino Gomes
- Succeeded by: Rachel Barros

Personal details
- Born: Anielle Francisco da Silva; 3 May 1985 (age 41) Rio de Janeiro, Brazil
- Party: PT (2024–present)
- Relations: Marielle Franco (sister)
- Education: Rio de Janeiro State University; Louisiana Tech University; North Carolina Central University (B.A.); Florida A&M University (M.A. in Journalism)
- Occupation: journalist political activist

Anielle Francisco da Silva (born 3 May 1985) is a Brazilian politician from the Workers' Party who was elected to the Chamber of Deputies in the 2026 Brazilian general election. She previously served as Minister of Racial Equality in the second cabinet of Lula da Silva from 1 January 2023 until her resignation on 1 April 2026.

== Family ==
Her sister Marielle Franco, was also a politician who was assassinated in 2018. After her death, the family established the Marielle Franco Institute with the aim to seek justice and continue her work. Anielle was the director of the institute.

== Cabinet ==
Franco was appointed as Minister of Racial Equality in the second cabinet of Lula da Silva in 2023. In 2024, she was named by the Brazilian media outlet Metrópoles as having filed a sexual misconduct complaint against human rights minister Silvio Almeida, who was subsequently dismissed by Lula in September.

Political offices
| Preceded by Nilma Lino Gomes (2016) as Special Secretariat for Policies to Promote Racial Equality | Minister of Racial Equality; 2023–2026 | Succeeded by Rachel Barros |
