= Ministry of Racial Equality (Brazil) =

Brazilian federal government agency

- Portuguese: Ministério da Igualdade Racial
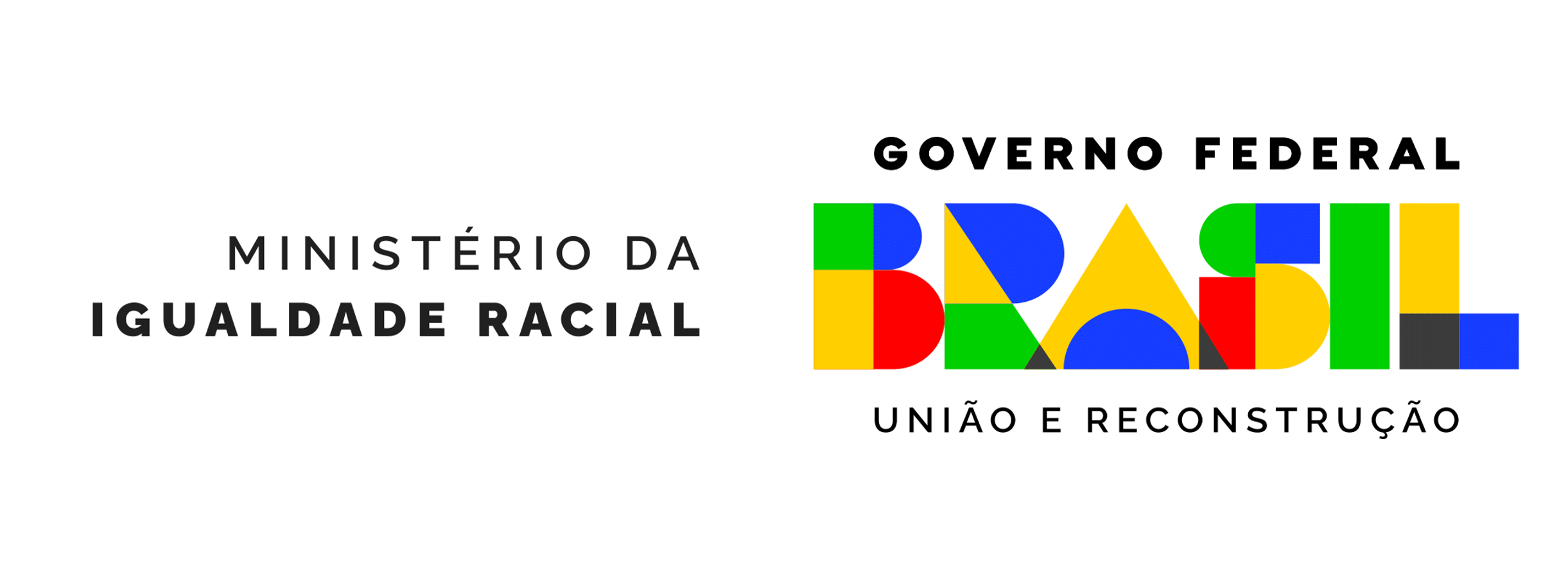

Agency overview
- Formed: 21 March 2003; 23 years ago
- Type: Ministry
- Jurisdiction: Federal government of Brazil
- Headquarters: Esplanada dos Ministérios, Bloco F Brasília, Federal District
- Annual budget: $91.8 m BRL (2023)
- Agency executives: Anielle Franco, Minister; Roberta Eugênio, Executive-Secretary; Iêda Leal de Souza, Secretary of Management of the National System of Promotion of Racial Equality; Ronaldo dos Santos, Secretary of Policies for Quilombolas, Traditional People and Communities of African Origin, Terreiro People and Gypsies; Márcia Regina de Lima, Secretary of Policies and Affirmative Actions, Fight and Overcoming Racism
- Website: www.gov.br/igualdaderacial/

Ministry of Racial Equality (Portuguese: Ministério da Igualdade Racial) of Brazil is a department of the direct public administration of the Federal Government responsible to plan, coordinate and execute public politics of promotion of racial equality and fight against racism on a national level. The incumbent minister of state who heads the ministry is Anielle Franco.

== History ==
It was created under the name of Special Secretariat of Politics of Promotion of Racial Equality of the Presidency of the Republic (SEPPIR), on 21 March 2003, during the government of Luiz Inácio Lula da Silva, as a secretariat linked to the Presidency and with cabinet-level recognition as a Minister of Racial Equality. The first chief minister was Matilde Ribeiro, social worker and university professor. In 2015, the position was folded by Dilma Rousseff under the Ministry of Women, Racial Equality and Human Rights, but the creation of the unified ministry was not approved by Congress. The unified ministry was dissolved and reactivated under the presidencies of Michel Temer and Jair Bolsonaro from 2015 to 2023. With the appointment of Anielle Franco by Lula da Silva, the mission of the Special Secretariat was revived as a separate Ministry of Racial Equality.

=== Role ===
Through its SQPT, the ministry coordinates with the Palmares Cultural Foundation (under the Ministry of Culture), the Instituto Nacional de Colonização e Reforma Agrária (under the Ministry of Agrarian Development), and the Ministry of Environment and Climate Change on securing rights, land title and public safety for quilombola communities.

== List of ministers ==
=== Parties ===
No.	Portrait	Minister	Took office	Left office	Time in office	Party	President
1	Matilde Ribeiro	Matilde Ribeiro (born 1960)	21 March 2003	6 February 2008	4 years, 322 days	PT	Luiz Inácio Lula da Silva (PT)
2	Edson Santos	Edson Santos (born 1954)	20 February 2008	31 March 2010	2 years, 39 days	PT	Luiz Inácio Lula da Silva (PT)
3	Eloi Ferreira	Eloi Ferreira (born 1959)	31 March 2010	1 January 2011	276 days	PT	Luiz Inácio Lula da Silva (PT)
4	Luiza Bairros	Luiza Bairros (1953–2016)	1 January 2011	1 January 2015	4 years, 0 days	Independent	Dilma Rousseff (PT)
5	Nilma Lino Gomes	Nilma Lino Gomes (born 1961)	1 January 2015	2 October 2015	274 days	Independent	Dilma Rousseff (PT)
6	Anielle Franco	Anielle Franco (born 1984)	1 January 2023	Incumbent	3 years, 302 days	PT	Luiz Inácio Lula da Silva (PT)

== Organizational structure ==
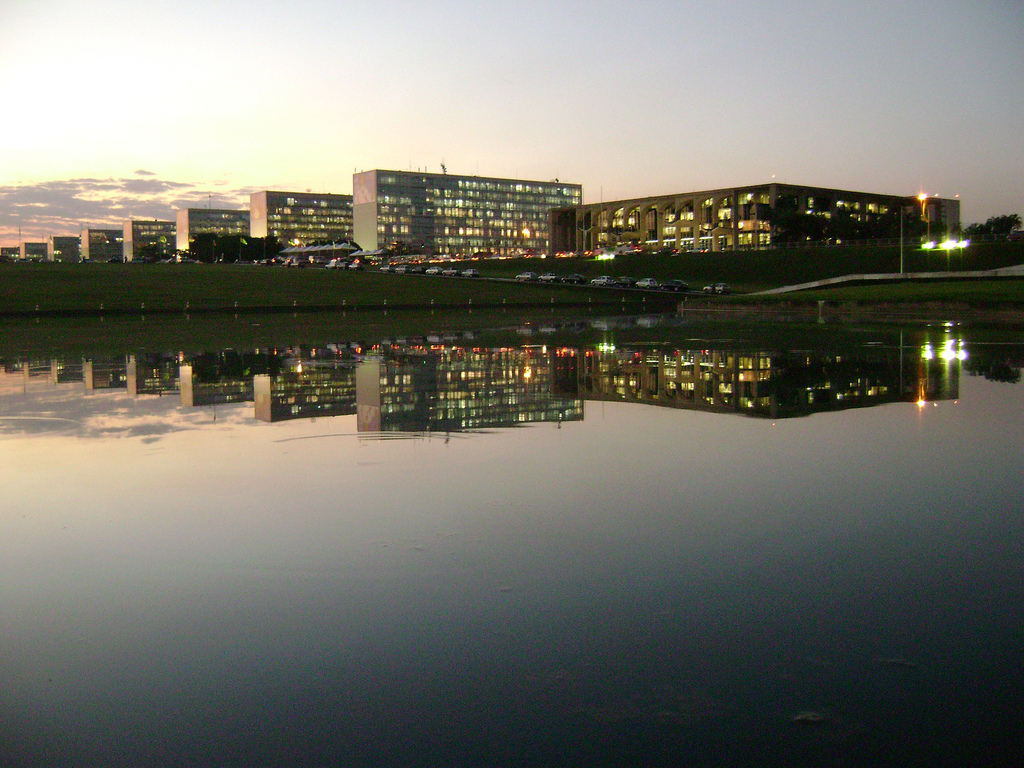
Ministries Esplanade reflected on the Nation Congress pool in Brasília.

Due to the long period it was a child agency in another department, the Ministry of Racial Equality is under a process of redeployment and should follow the organizational structure of the other Brazilian ministries that are composed by the following units and organs:

- Direct and immediate assistance organs: Minister Cabinet; Executive Secretariat; Special Advisory of Internal Control (AECI); Juridical Consultancy (CONJUR).
- Singular specific organs: thematic secretariats that are part of the second-tier of the federal government (these are subdivided in specialized department that form the third-tier):
  - Secretariat for Affirmative Action Policies, Combating and Overcoming Racism (SEPAR)
    - Directorate of Affirmative Action Policies
    - Directorate of Policies to Combat and Overcome Racism
  - Secretariat of Policies for Quilombolas, Traditional Peoples and Communities of African Origin, Terreiro Peoples and Gypsies (SQPT)
    - Directorate of Policies for Traditional Peoples and Communities of African Origin and Terreiros (DPMAT)
    - Directorate of Policies for Quilombolas and Gypsies
  - Management Secretariat of the National System for the Promotion of Racial Equality
    - National System for the Promotion of Racial Equality (SINAPIR)
    - Interfederative Coordination Board;
    - Directorate of Evaluation, Monitoring and Information Management

=== Collegiate bodies ===
It has had or has the following administrative boards with consultative, deliberative and normative functions under its responsibility:

- National Council for the Promotion of Racial Equality (CNPIR)

== See also ==
- Cabinet of Brazil
- Palmares Cultural Foundation
