= Kabengele Munanga =

Congolese-Brazilian anthropologist

- Born: 22 June 1940 (age 86); Bakwa-Kalonji, Kasaï Province, Belgian Congo (modern-day Democratic Republic of the Congo)

Academic background
- Education: University of Lubumbashi; Université catholique de Louvain; University of São Paulo (PhD)

Academic work
- Institutions: University of São Paulo; Federal University of Rio Grande do Norte; Federal University of Recôncavo da Bahia
- Doctoral students: Nilma Lino Gomes

Kabengele Munanga (born 22 June 1942) is a Congolese-Brazilian anthropologist and professor who is currently a visiting senior professor at the Federal University of Recôncavo da Bahia. He is a specialist on the anthropology of Afro-Brazilians, researching the issue of racism in Brazilian society. He is a graduate of the University of Lubumbashi (1969) and graduated with a doctorate in anthropology from University of São Paulo (1977).

== Biography ==
Munanga was born in 1940, in the small city of Bakwa-Kalonji, in what is now the Democratic Republic of the Congo. He is of Luba background. At ten years old, he left his hometown to study in other cities, primarily in colonial Catholic schools. He began to attend the University of Lubumbashi for a degree in Social Sciences, but after two years, switched to the recently created Anthropology faculty. After graduating in 1969 he became his countries first anthropologist, he was invited to earn his master's degree at the Université catholique de Louvain in Belgium. Munanga returned to the Congo to finish his dissertation but could not due so due to the policies of the newly independent Republic of Zaire. He went to Brazil at the invite of professor Fernando Mourão, of the University of São Paulo, where he earned his doctorate and returned to the Congo.

In 1980, he established himself in Brazil to assume the position of head of the Anthropology department at the Federal University of Rio Grande do Norte. The following year, he moved to São Paulo. He was a professor of anthropology Faculty of Philosophy, Languages and Human Sciences, vice-director of the Museum of Contemporary Art, director of the Museum of Archeology and Ethnology and the Center of African Studies at USP. Since 2014, he has been a visiting senior professor at the Federal University of Recôncavo da Bahia.

Munanga was awarded the Ordem do Mérito Cultural in 2002.

== Publications ==
- 1988- Negritude:Usos e Sentidos ISBN 8582176449
- 1998-Racismo: Perspectivas Para Um Estudo Contextualizado Da Sociedade Brasileira (co-written with Carlos Alberto Hasenblag and Lilia Moritz Schwarcz) ISBN 8522802297
- 1999- Rediscutindo a mestiçagem no Brasil: identidade nacional versus identidade negra ISBN 8532622089
- 2006- O Negro no Brasil de Hoje (co-written with Nilma Lino Gomes) ISBN 8526011340
- 2009 - Origens Africanas do Brasil Contemporâneo ISBN 8526012665
- 2010 - Arte, cidade, e meio ambiente (co-written with Elza Ajzenberg) ISBN 978-85-7229-046-3
- 2023 - Arte afrobrasileiro: o que é isso ISBN 978-65-86962-74-1

== Influence ==
Experiences influenced Munanga's professional path in both Africa and as he became more integrated into Brazilian society. From his experiences in Brazil, his academic interests shifted to anthropological and ethnic/racial issues in the country. Early works such as Négritude and Rediscutindo a mestiçagem no Brasil emphasize Munanga's view that négritude should serve to challenge colonialism and Eurocentrism. Munanga proposes that traditional African culture and affirmation of black identity should be strengthened and embraced.

Munanga also integrated his anthropological expertise, along with his interest in ethnic/racial issues, to study the colonial conditions that produced the notion of "race". Findings included the history of pseudoscientific premises and social hierarchies utilized to dehumanize black people and place the "white race" at the top of civilization. Munanga discusses the necessity for African peoples to assimilate into the customs and ideas of white society, leading to a departure from black/African traditional practices and values. Negritude thus represents to Munanga a refusal to adopt white customs and a conscious adoption of solidarity with black identity and race.

== Impact ==
When Munanga became a professor at the University of São Paulo, he became the first black professor of the university. The contrast in the population of Afro-Brazilians present in Brazil to their underrepresentation in areas of higher education, principally at Brazil's largest university, calls attention to the difficulties faced by black people on a large scale in Brazil. It is also notable that Munanga immigrated to Brazil during the military dictatorship, which added another layer of complexity as he entered higher education while widespread government oppression was abounding.

Munanga has focused his efforts on highlighting disparities in the country and advocating for change in Brazil at both the academic and professional and political levels. Munanga's role as a professor at USP is his platform for encouraging change. He has also traveled to other universities and participated in public interviews with various news networks and larger institutions to help spread the ideas of racial equality and black cultural ownership, expressed with pride and as a form of empowerment.

Munanga's interests are not only confined to racial issues in Brazil but also address the adjacent concerns associated with sex and homophobia. All these issues are connected and related, and, as such, can be addressed in a unified manner within Munanga's approach to societal problems.

His criticism of the "racial democracy" is pronounced, reflected by his perspective that people of all racial backgrounds do not occupy and share all positions of power and influence. Before arriving in Brazil, Munanga held a more sympathetic view of this approach. Still, after arriving in Brazil, having his own experiences, and noticing the lack of fellow black individuals in places of higher education and in more exclusive areas of society, he began to push back. His influence has placed greater emphasis on recognizing and valuing black people and on acknowledging African heritage, which remains a strong component of Brazilian history and culture. Because of the efforts made, Menanga has expressed satisfaction with the more open conversation about the presence of racism in Brazil, as well as the acknowledgement of African influence and current contributions to society.
