= Eloi Ferreira =

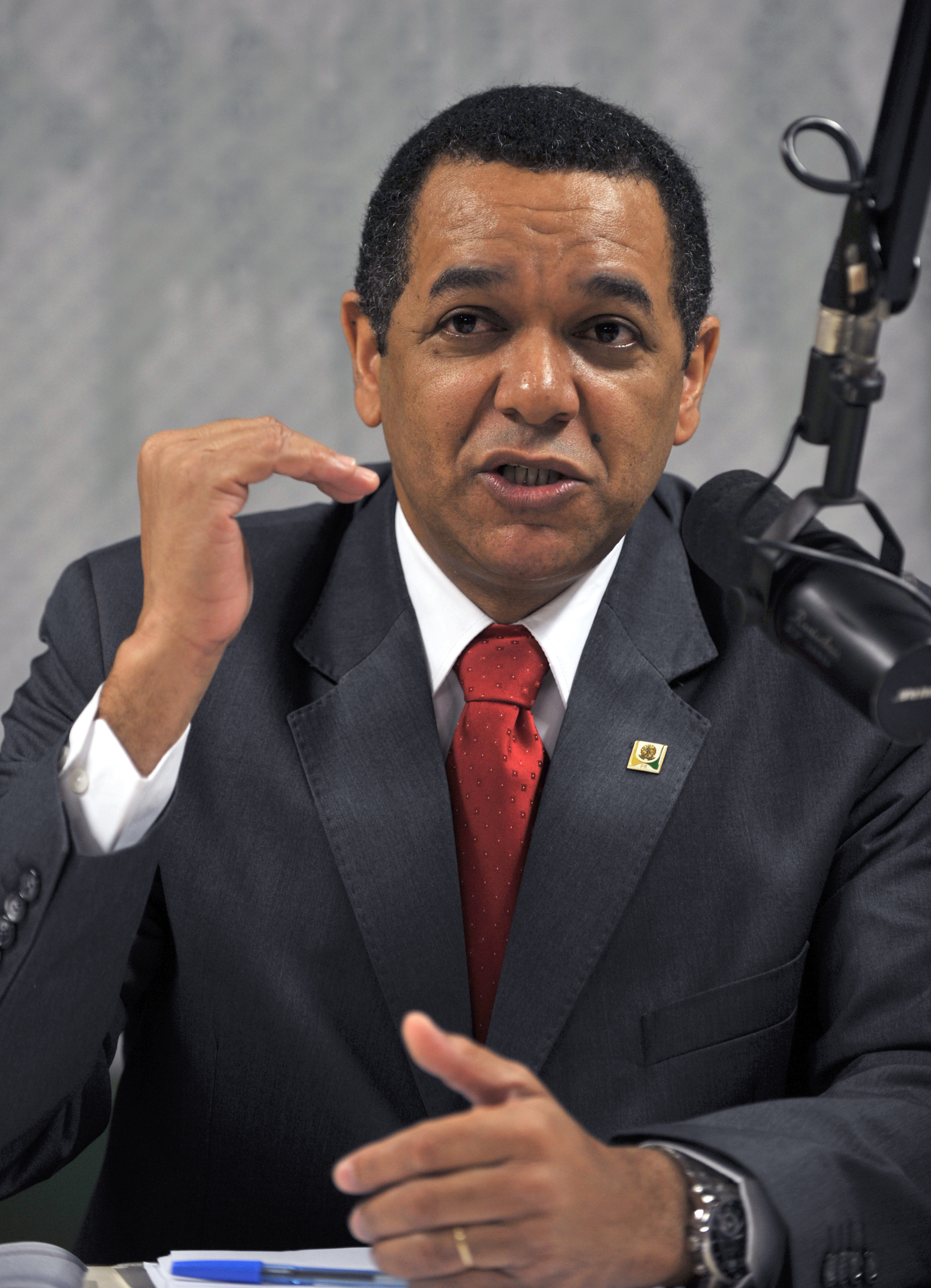
- Eloi Ferreira in 2010

President of the Palmares Cultural Foundation
- In office 3 March 2011 – 29 April 2013
- Preceded by: Zulu Araújo
- Succeeded by: Hilton Cobra

Minister of Racial Equality
- In office 31 March 2010 – 1 January 2011
- Preceded by: Edson Santos
- Succeeded by: Luiza Helena de Bairros

Personal details
- Born: Eloi Ferreira de Araújo; 15 June 1959 (age 67) Itaperuna, Rio de Janeiro, Brazil
- Party: PT (1981); PCdoB (1981–1993); PT (1994–present)
- Education: Federal Rural University of Rio de Janeiro; Federal University of Rio de Janeiro
- Occupation: Zoologist, lawyer

Eloi Ferreira de Araújo (born 15 June 1959) is a Brazilian zoologist and lawyer. He served as the Minister of Racial Equality from 2010 to 2011. He later served as the president of the Palmares Cultural Foundation from 2011 to 2013. He is a member of the Workers' Party (PT).

== Biography ==
Ferreira was born on 15 June 1959 in Itaperuna, in the state of Rio de Janeiro. His family moved to Petrópolis in the 1960s. He graduated with a degree in zootechnics from the Federal Rural University of Rio de Janeiro in 1975. He worked in the field beginning in the 1980s. In the 1990s, he graduated with a law degree and later, in 2002, graduated with a master's degree in transportation engineering from COPPE, with the Federal University of Rio de Janeiro.

He also graduated as a machinist from SENAI in the 1970s, also becoming active in political activism during this time period. He co-founded the PT in 1981. Afterwards, he secretly joined the Communist Party (PCdoB), before returning to the PT in 1994.

In 1987, he moved to Brasília, where he became chief of staff to federal deputy Edmilson Valentim. He returned to Rio de Janeiro in 1989 to become chief of staff to city councilor Edson Santos during his time with the municipal chamber. He also coordinated Santos' reelection campaigns, as well as his campaigns for federal deputy and for senator.

In 2008, he became adjunct secretary of the Ministry of Racial Equality at Santos' invitation. After Santos resigned to run for public office in 2010, Ferreira assumed the ministerial position until the end of the first Lula administration. He was succeeded by Luiza Helena de Bairros. During the administration of Dilma Rousseff, he became the president of the Palmares Cultural Foundation from 2011 to 2013.
