= Polytechnic School of the Federal University of Rio de Janeiro =

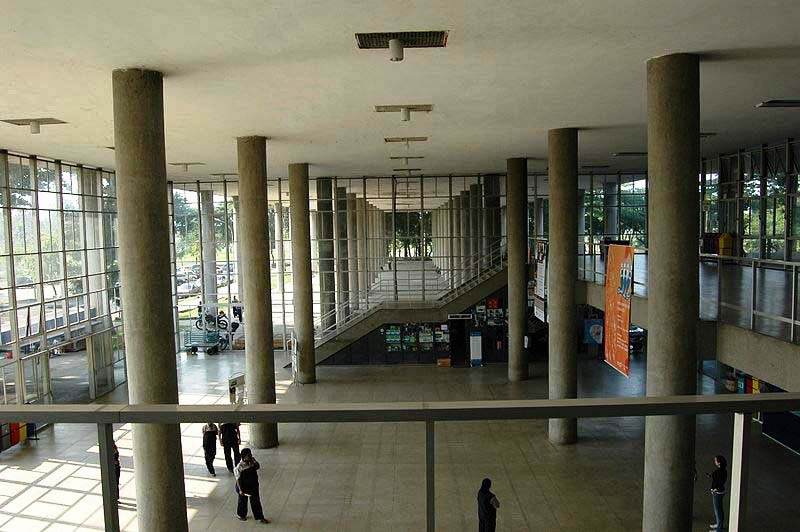
One of the halls of the Technology Center

The Polytechnic School of the Federal University of Rio de Janeiro (Portuguese: Escola Politécnica da Universidade Federal do Rio de Janeiro), sometimes referred to as Poli, founded in 1792, is the third oldest engineering school in the world and oldest in the Americas, with the Military Institute of Engineering (Instituto Militar de Engenharia - IME) being one of the first institutions of higher education in Brazil. It is considered one of the best institutions of Latin America in engineering education. It is located in the Center of Technology of the Federal University of Rio de Janeiro (CT), in the Cidade Universitária ("University City"), Rio de Janeiro.

== History ==
In 1792, Vice-Roi D. José Luís de Castro, Count of Resende, signed the statutes approving the creation of Royal Academy of Artillery, Fortification and Drawing of Rio de Janeiro (Real Academia de Artilharia, Fortificação e Desenho), according to the model of the Royal Academy of Artillery, Fortification and Drawing of Lisbon (Academia Real de Artilharia, Fortificação e Desenho), starting the education of subjects that would become the base of engineering in Brazil.

Later, on December 4, 1810, the Prince Regent (future King John VI of Portugal) signed an act creating the Royal Military Academy (Academia Real Militar) that would succeed and replace the Royal Academy of Artillery, Fortification and Design, and from descend directly the Military Institute of Engineering and the famous Polythecnic School of Rio de Janeiro (Escola Politécnica do Rio de Janeiro), then named National School of Engineering (Escola Nacional de Engenharia), modified to School of Engineering (Escola de Engenharia) and, in October 2004, returning to be the Polythecnical School of UFRJ (Escola Politécnica da UFRJ), now with the name associated to UFRJ.

The Federal University of Rio de Janeiro was formed by the union of ancient unities of higher education in Rio de Janeiro: the National Faculty of Law (Faculdade Nacional de Direito); the National Faculty of Medicine (Faculdade Nacional de Medicina), former Academy of Medicine and Surgery (Academia de Medicina e Cirurgia); and the Polytechnic School, each one with autonomy. Other unities have been added to these ones, such as National School of Fine Arts (Escola Nacional de Belas Artes), National Faculty of Philosophy (Faculdade Nacional de Filosofia) and several courses that succeeded the pioneers. The University of Brazil (Universidade do Brasil), as Federal University of Rio de Janeiro was first named, represented a fundamental role in implementation of higher education in the country.

== Structure ==
The Polythechnic School - Poli, with Alberto Luiz Coimbra Institute - Graduate School and Research in Engineering - COPPE (Instituto Alberto Luiz Coimbra de Pós-Graduação e Pesquisa em Engenharia - COPPE), the School of Chemistry (Escola de Química - EQ) and the Professora Eloisa Mano Institute of Macromolecules (Instituto de Macromoléculas Professora Eloisa Mano - IMA) are the unities that constitute the Center of Technology (Centro de Tecnologia - CT) of UFRJ.

The Polytechnic School of UFRJ has 222 professors, including more than 200 with doctoral degrees, and is one of the largest federal engineering schools in Brazil. Its laboratories support a range of research projects and academic activities.

The institutional relations between Poli and COPPE are a few complex. Although both are distinct unities, the former having as main mission the undergraduate education in engineering and the latter the graduate courses, both share more than 70% of professors, laboratories and facilities. All the undergraduate and graduate courses have professors of both institutions, however the administrative responsibility for undergraduate courses is of Poli and for the graduate courses is of COPPE. Poli is also subdivided in departments, which are the smallest administrative instances of UFRJ.

== Departments ==
Below, the twelve departments of Poli that are responsible for offer more than 600 subjects annually:

- Department of Applied Mechanics and Structures (Departamento de Mecânica Aplicada e Estruturas - DME)
- Department of Civil Construction (Departamento de Construção Civil - DCC)
- Department of Electric Engineering (Departamento de Engenharia Elétrica - DEE)
- Department of Electronic and Computer Engineering (Departamento de Engenharia Eletrônica e de Computação - DEL)
- Department of Graphic Expression (Departamento de Expressão Gráfica - DEG)
- Department of Hydric Resources and Environment (Departamento de Recursos Hídricos e Meio Ambiente - DRHIMA)
- Department of Industrial Engineering (Departamento de Engenharia Industrial - DEI)
- Department of Mechanical Engineering (Departamento de Engenharia Mecânica - DEM)
- Department of Metallurgical and Materials Engineering (Departamento de Engenharia Metalúrgica e de Materiais - DMM)
- Department of Naval and Oceanic Engineering (Departamento de Engenharia Naval e Oceânica - DENO)
- Department of Nuclear Engineering (Departamento de Engenharia Nuclear - DEN)
- Department of Transport Engineering (Departamento de Engenharia de Transportes - DET)

== Courses ==
The Polytechnic School offers thirteen undergraduate courses in Engineering:

- Civil Engineering (Engenharia Civil)
- Computer and Information Engineering (Engenharia de Computação e Informação)
- Control and Automation Engineering (Engenharia de Controle e Automação)
- Electrical Engineering (Engenharia Elétrica)
- Electronic and Computer Engineering (Engenharia Eletrônica e de Computação)
- Environmental Engineering (Engenharia Ambiental)
- Materials Engineering (Engenharia de Materiais)
- Mechanical Engineering (Engenharia Mecânica)
- Metallurgical Engineering (Engenharia Metalúrgica)
- Naval and Oceanic Engineering (Engenharia Naval e Oceânica)
- Petroleum Engineering (Engenharia de Petróleo)
- Production Engineering (Engenharia de Produção)
- "Basic Cycle" Engineering (Engenharia Ciclo Básico) (after 2 years of basic engineering education, students must choose among the above specializations)

== Partnerships ==
The Polytechnic School has partnerships with some of the most important research centers of Brazil: the Petrobras Research Center (Centro de Pesquisas da Petrobras - CENPES), the Eletrobras Research Center (Centro de Pesquisas da Eletrobras - CEPEL), the Research Center in Mineral Technology (Centro de Pesquisa em Tecnologia Mineral - CETEM) and the Institute of Nuclear Engineering (Instituto de Engenharia Nuclear). All these centers provide to Poli students training, laboratories and internships.
