= Hilton Cobra =

Brazilian actor

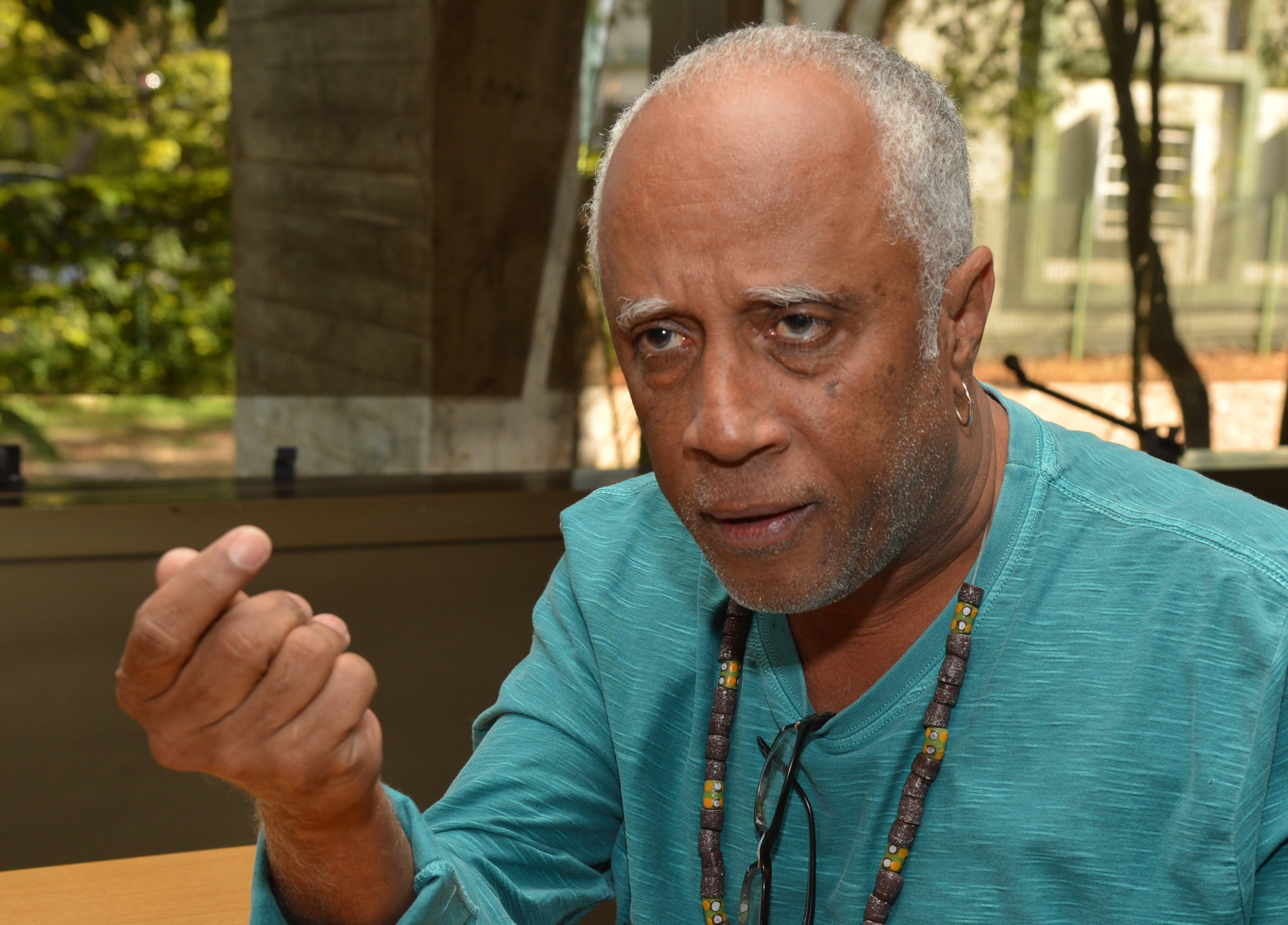
- Picture: Valter Campana/ABr

President of the Palmares Cultural Foundation
- In office 26 February 2013 – 29 April 2015
- President: Dilma Rousseff
- Preceded by: Eloi Ferreira
- Succeeded by: Cida Abreu

Personal details
- Born: José Hilton Santos Almeida; 25 May 1956 (age 70) Feira de Santana, Bahia, Brazil
- Occupation: Actor, theatre director

José Hilton Santos Almeida (born 25 May 1956), better known as Hilton Cobra or Cobrinha, is a Brazilian actor and theatre director.

== Life ==
Cobra was born in 1956 in Feira de Santana, Bahia. From 1993 to 1994, he was a member of the comedy group Os Trapalhões. He directed the Centro Cultural José Bonifácio from 1993 to 2000. During this period, he was responsible for the creation of projects such as Nossas Yabás, "Projeto Griot", and "Zumbi Rio – 300 Anos". Later on, he was one of the co-founders of the Black artist group Akoben.

In 2001, he created the Cia dos Comuns in Rio de Janeiro, with the objective of amplifying the presence of Black artists in contemporary Brazilian theatre. With the collective, he led the plays A Roda do Mundo (2001), Candances – A Reconstrução do Fogo (2003), Bakulo – os bem lembrados (2005) and Silêncio (2007). In 2008, he played the main role in the adaptation of Luiz Marfuz for Triste Fim de Policarpo Quaresma. The play, stage by the management of Teatro Castro Alves, won the Braskem award for best play in 2009.

From 2013 to 2015, he was the president of the Palmares Cultural Foundation.

== Filmography ==
=== Television ===
Year	Title	Role	Notes
1992	Perigosas Peruas	Operator	
1993–94	Os Trapalhões	Various roles	
1997	A Justiceira		Episode: "Cinzas no Planalto"
2001	Brava Gente	Jaiminho	Episode: "Pastores da Noite"
2002	Pastores da Noite	Jaiminho	Episode: "O Compadre de Ogum"
2023	Fuzuê	Cata Ouro	

=== Film ===
Year	Title	Role	Note
1991	Não Quero Falar sobre Isso Agora	Capanga de Macula	
2004	O Deus da Raça	Letter reader	Short film documentary
2020	Executive Order	Gaspar	
