= Valongo Wharf =

Former wharf in Rio de Janeiro

- Cais do Valongo (Portuguese)
- Cais da Imperatriz (Empress Wharf)
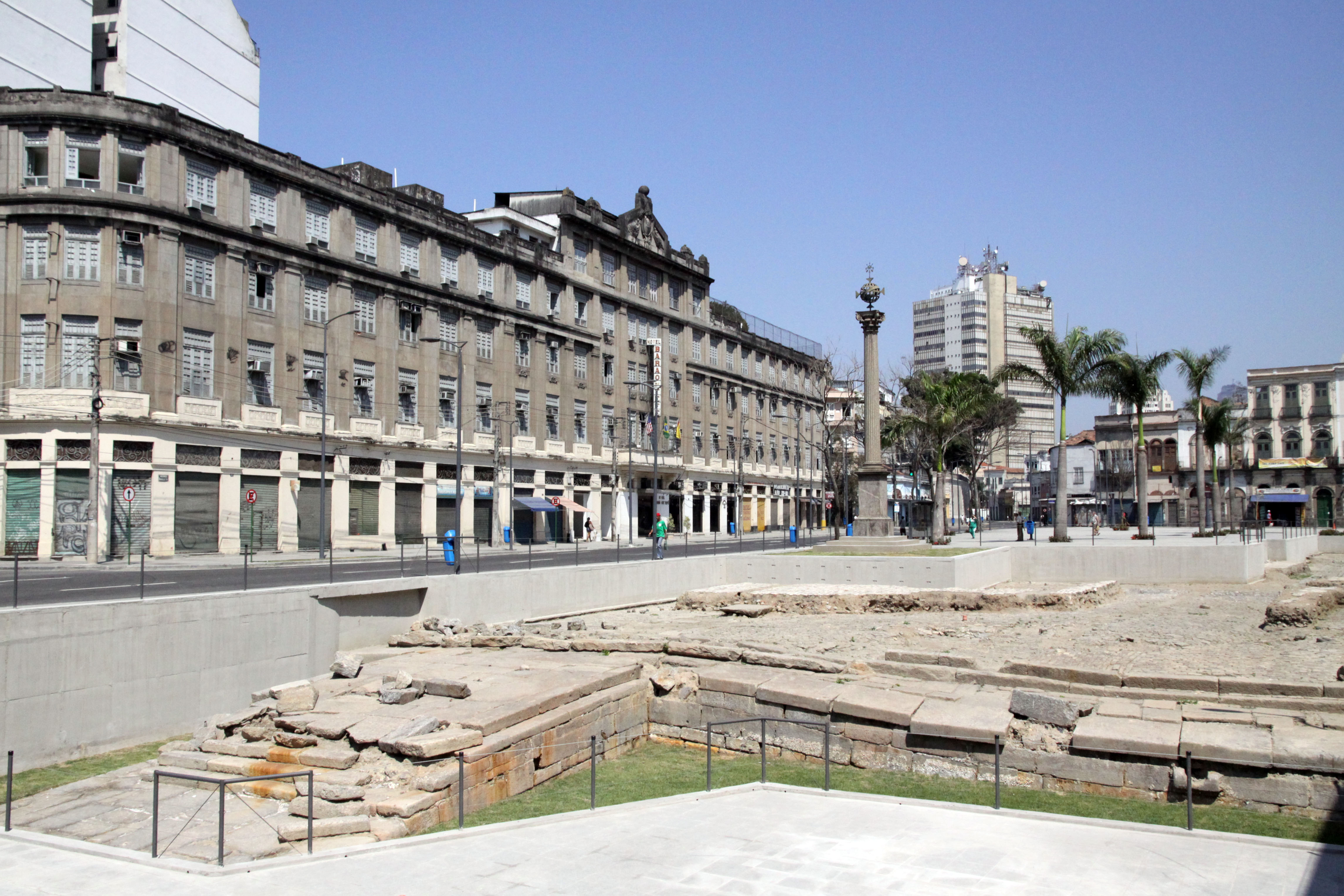
- Cais do Valongo e da Imperatriz archaeological site

- Location within Brazil
- 22°53′49.6″S 43°11′14.6″W
- Location: Port of Rio de Janeiro, Brazil

History
- Built: 1811
- Abandoned: 1911

Site notes
- Excavation dates: 2011

UNESCO World Heritage Site
- Type: Cultural
- Criteria: vi
- Designated: 2017 (41st session)
- Reference no.: 1548
- Region: Latin America and the Caribbean

The Valongo Wharf (Portuguese: Cais do Valongo) is an old dock located in the port area of Rio de Janeiro, between the current Coelho e Castro and Sacadura Cabral streets. Built in 1811, it was the site of landing and trading of enslaved Africans until 1831, with the blockade of Africa banning the Atlantic slave trade to Brazil (but the Brazilian government continued turning a blind eye to the trade until 1850).

During the twenty years of its operation, between 500 thousand and one million slaves landed at Valongo. Brazil received about 4.9 million slaves through the Atlantic trade.

In 1843, the wharf was renovated for the landing of Princess Teresa Cristina of Bourbon-Two Sicilies, who was to marry the emperor D. Pedro II. The wharf was then called Cais da Imperatriz (Empress Wharf).

Between 1850 and 1920, the area around the old pier became a space occupied by black slaves or freedmen of several nations - an area that Heitor dos Prazeres called Pequena África (Little Africa).

== History ==
Until the mid-1770s, slaves disembarked at Praia do Peixe, now called Praça 15, and were traded in Rua Direita (today Rua 1º de Março), in the center of Rio de Janeiro, in plain sight. In 1774, a new legislation established the transfer of this market to the region of Valongo, on the initiative of the second Marquis of Lavradio, Dom Luís de Almeida Portugal Soares de Alarcão d'Eça e Melo Silva Mascarenhas, viceroy of Brazil, alarmed at "The terrible custom of as soon as the blacks disembark in the port from the African coast, enter the city through the main public thoroughfares, not only loaded with innumerable diseases but naked".

The market was transferred, but the wharf was not built yet, and the alternative was to disembark the slaves at the customs and immediately send them by boat to Valongo, from which they would jump directly onto the beach. In 1779 the slave trade finally settled in the Valongo area, where it reached its peak between 1808 with the arrival of the Portuguese royal family, and in 1831, when the slave trade to Brazil was banned, and it was done clandestinely.

From 1808 the traffic nearly doubled, following the growth of the city that, after the transfer of the Portuguese court to Brazil, went from 15 thousand to 30 thousand inhabitants. However, it was not until 1811 that the wharf was built, and the landing was done directly on Valongo. From 1811 to 1831, between 500,000 and a million slaves landed there. At the end of the 1820s, the slave trade to Brazil was at its peak. Rio de Janeiro was then an important commercial slave trading post, and Valongo was the main gateway for blacks from Angola, East and Central West Africa - while in Maranhão and Bahia ships came from Guinea and West Africa respectively.

In 1831, the transatlantic slave trade was banned, under pressure from England, and Valongo was closed. The traffickers then proceeded to make the landings in clandestine ports.

In 1843, a 60-centimeter thick embankment was made on the dock of Valongo for the construction of a new anchorage, destined to receive Princess Teresa Cristina, future wife of D. Pedro II. The wharf was then renamed 'Cais da Imperatriz'. But this also would eventually be buried in 1911, during the urban reform undertaken by mayor Pereira Passos.

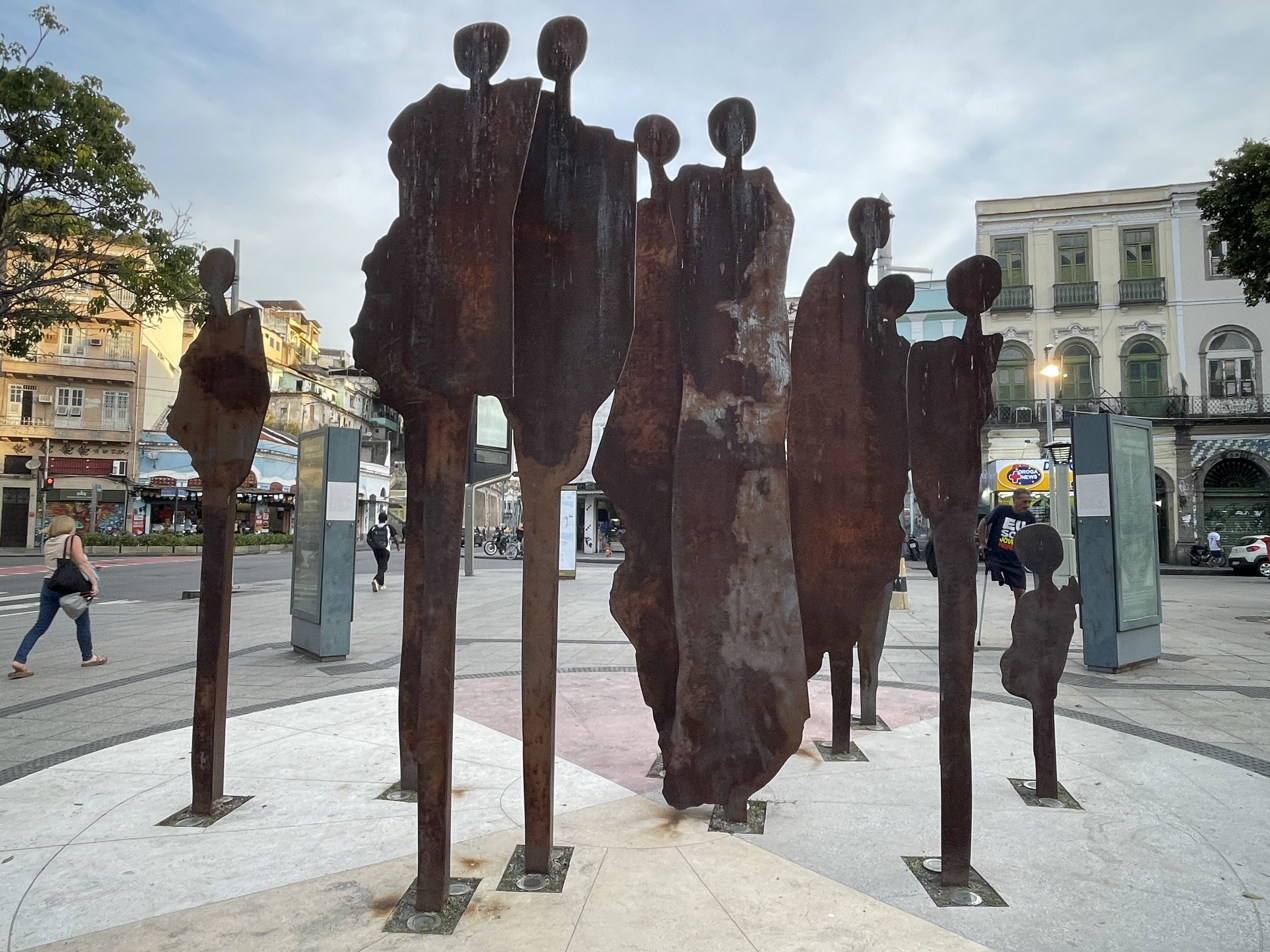
Valonga Wharf memorial sculpture

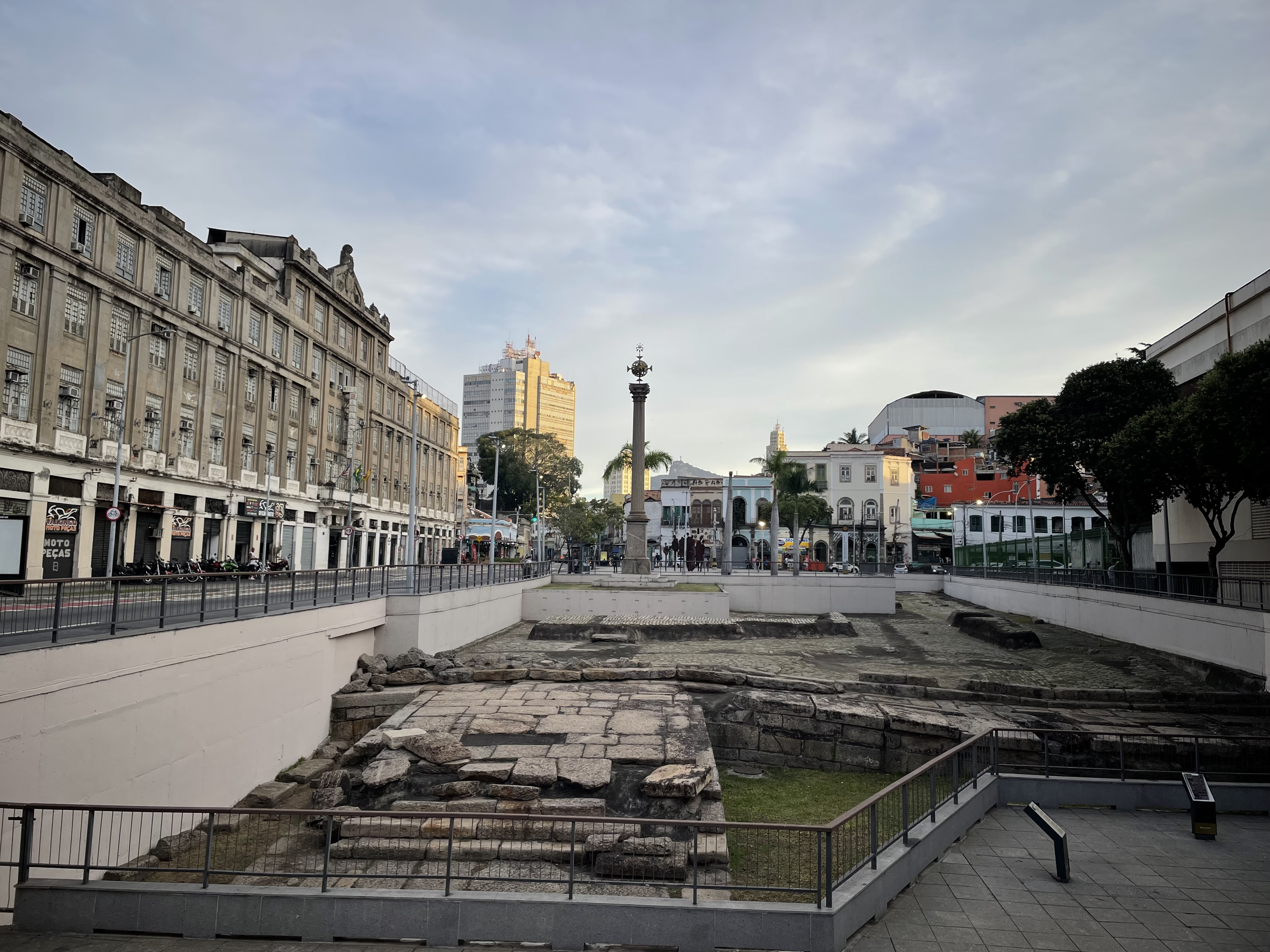
Valonga Wharf UNESCO site (2026)

== Rediscovery ==
In 2011, during excavations carried out as part of revitalization efforts in advance of the 2016 Summer Olympic Games, the two wharfs - Valongo and Imperatriz - were discovered, one on top of the other, and, along with them, a large number of amulets and worship objects from Congo, Angola and Mozambique. IPHAN and the city of Rio de Janeiro inscribed the wharf's archaeological site to the Unesco World Heritage Site Tentative List.

The Valongo wharf was officially designated a World Heritage Site in July 2017.Yet, as of 2022, the Brazilian Government had yet not erected a memorial at the site and had taken few steps to raise awareness of its importance.

In November 2023, Rio de Janeiro commemorated the site with the addition of new explanatory signage and a memorial sculpture depicting human figures that collectively form the silhouette of the African continent.

== See also ==
- Atlantic slave trade to Brazil
- Afro-Brazilian history
