= Atlantic slave trade to Brazil =

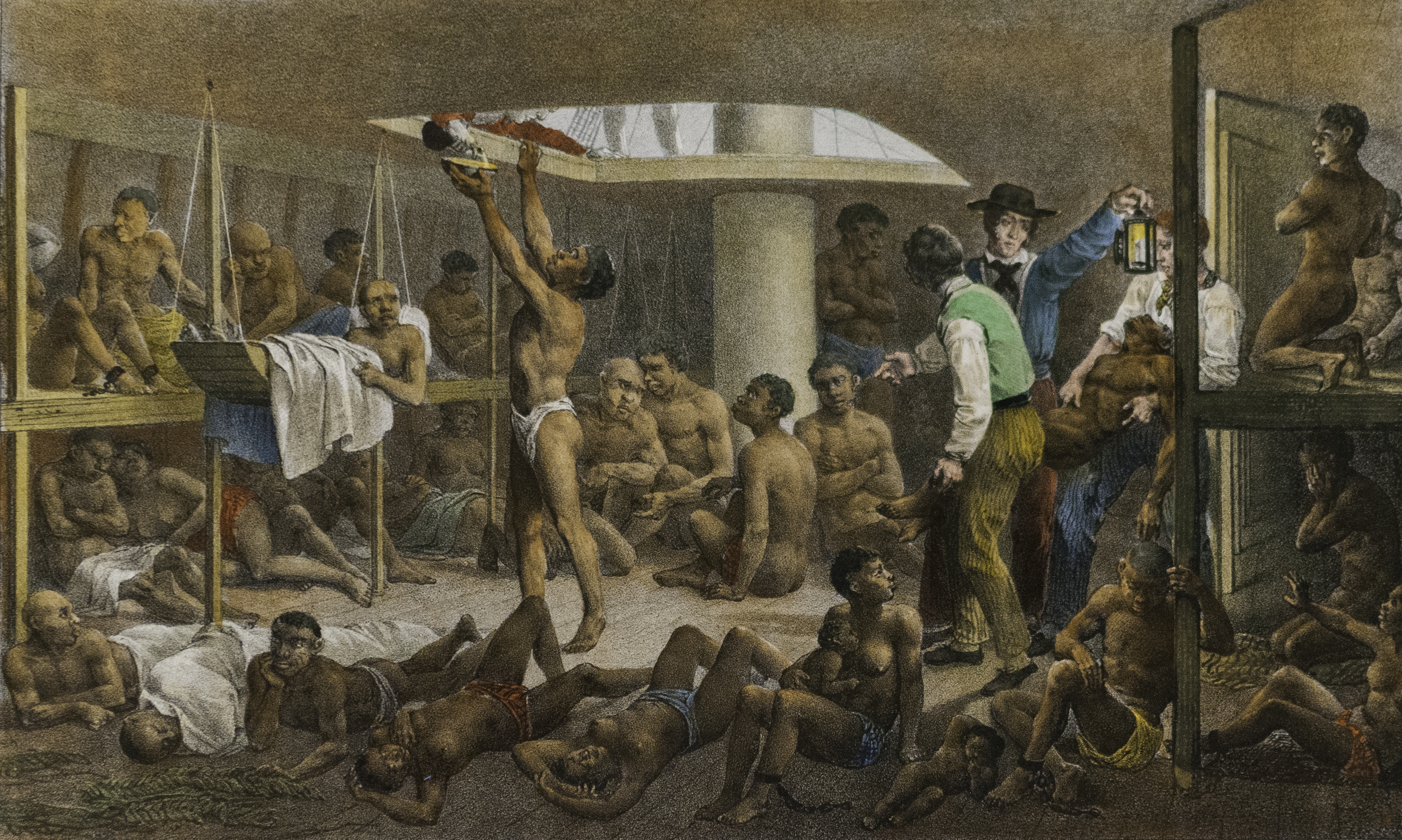
Rugendas - Nègres a fond de cale

The Transatlantic slave trade to Brazil (c. 1500s-1860s) was a period defined by European demand for resources (sugar, metals, etc.) within the Americas. This demand led to the enslavement of Africans along the western coast of the African continent, resulting in approximately 10 to 30 million Africans who were sold and transported across the Atlantic for labor, primarily on plantations. Of those who were transported, approximately 44 percent were brought to Brazil. It was divided into four phases: The cycle of Guinea (16th century); the cycle of Angola (17th century) which trafficked people from Bakongo, Mbundu, Benguela, and Ovambo; cycle of Costa da Mina, now renamed Cycle of Benin and Dahomey (18th century - 1815), which trafficked people from Yoruba, Ewe, Minas, Hausa, Nupe, and Borno; and the illegal trafficking period, which was suppressed by the United Kingdom (1815–1851). During this period, to escape the supervision of British ships enforcing an anti-slavery blockade, Brazilian slave traders began to seek alternative routes to the routes of the West African coast, turning to Mozambique.

== Early history ==
The slave trade had already a strong presence in Africa for thousands of years, at the time of the European Age of Discovery. The Portuguese began contact with the African slave markets to rescue civilians and military captives since the time of the Reconquista. At this time, the Alfaqueque was the one who had the mission to negotiate captives rescue. When Catherine of Austria authorized the slave trade to Brazil, the slave trade from Africa, which was previously dominated by Africans, started also to be dominated by Europeans. The lists of enslaved captives for ransom and freed during the reign of John V of Portugal reveal that even Brazilians were captured and sold in African markets.

The slave trade to Brazil was not exclusive to European and Brazilian white traders, but it was an activity in which pumbeiros, who were mestizos, free blacks and also former slaves, not only dedicated to the slave trade as controlled trade coastal - in the case of Angola, also part of domestic trade - also played the role of cultural mediators in the Atlantic slave trade of Africa. See Francisco Félix de Sousa, freed at age 17, the largest Brazilian slaves trader.

== The motive of trafficking – the sugar economy ==
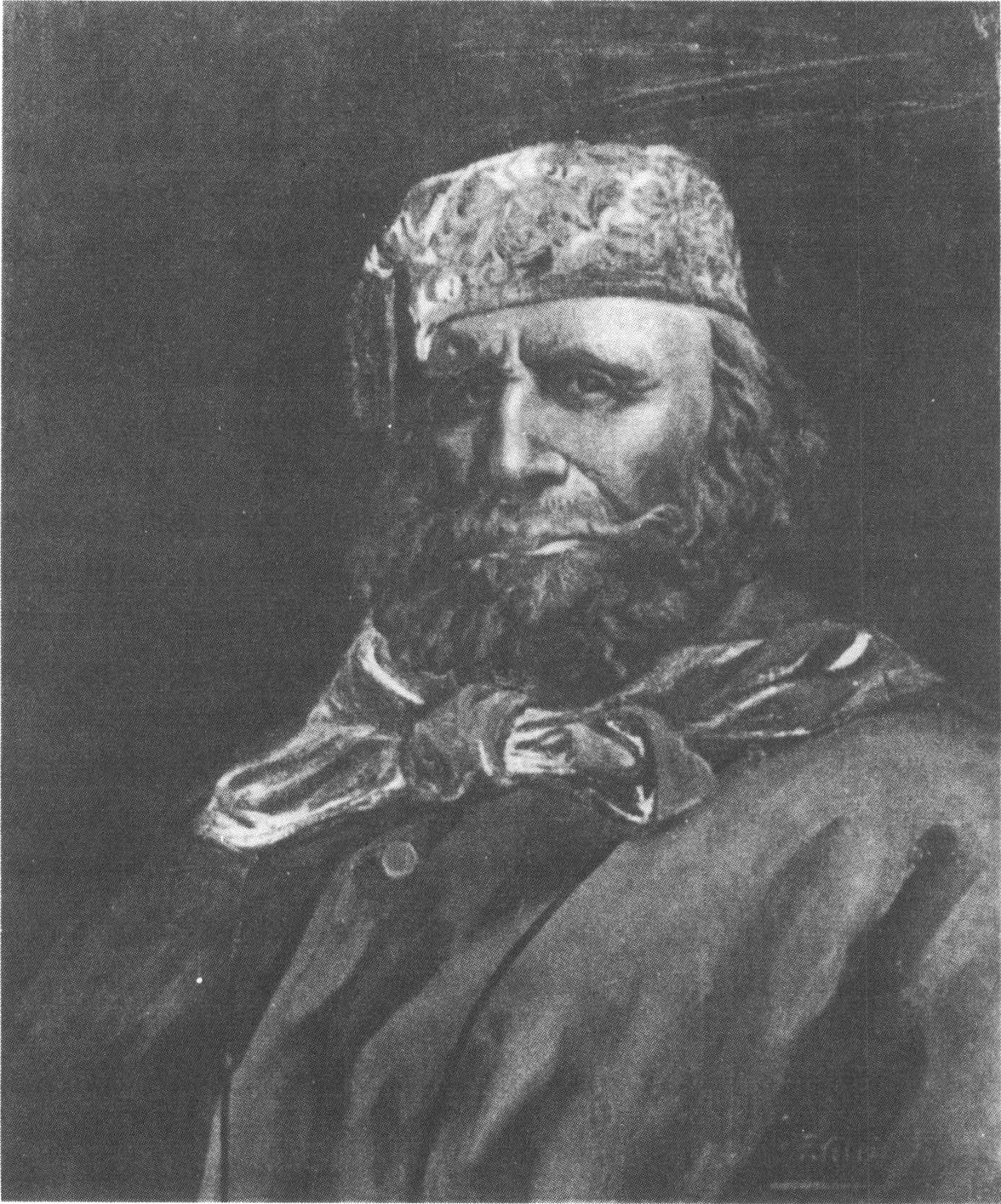
Francisco Félix de Sousa (1754–1849), famous Brazilian slave trader.

From 1530, with the knowledge gained in the manufacture of sugar in the islands of Madeira and São Tomé, and then with the creation in 1549 of the Governorate General of Brazil, the Portuguese Crown sought to encourage the construction of sugar mills in Brazil. But the settlers found great difficulties in recruitment of manpower and lack of capital to finance the installation of sugar mills. The various epidemics that, from 1560, decimated the Indian slaves at an alarming rate, caused that the Portuguese Crown to create laws that prohibit, partially, the slavery of Indians, that is, "forbade the enslavement of converted Indians and only allowed the capture of slaves only through war against the Indians that they fight or devour the Portuguese, or allied Indians or slaves; this war should be enacted by the sovereign or the Governor General." Other adaptations of this law came later.

The subsequent lack of a forced and free manpower for colonial exploitation meant that colonists began looking for ways to introduce labor from other sources. As for the Dutch, from 1630, they began to occupy the sugar producing regions in Brazil, and to address the lack of slave labor, in 1638 embarked on the conquest of Portuguese warehouse of São Jorge da Mina, and 1641, organized the take over of Luanda and Benguela in Angola.

It is argued that the survival of the first sugarcane mills, the planting of sugarcane, cotton, coffee, and tobacco were the decisive elements in the metropolis sent to the Brazil the first African slaves, coming from different parts of Africa, bringing their habits, customs, music, dance, cuisine, language, myths, rites, and religion, which has infiltrated the people, forming, next to the Catholic religion, the two largest religions in Brazil.

== The first slaves and the legalization of slavery ==
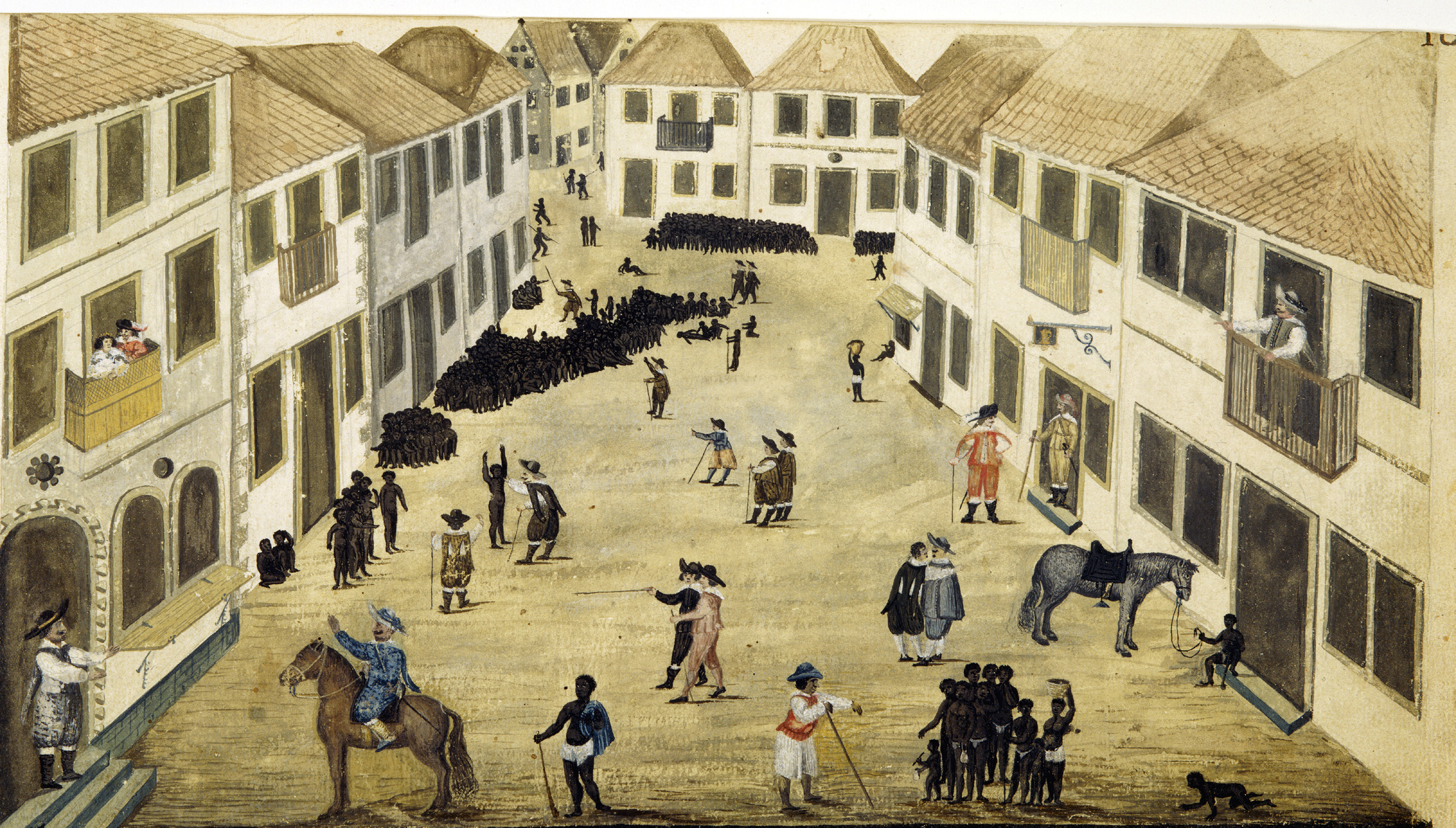
"Market of slaves in Recife" by Zacharias Wagenaer, painted around 1637. During this time African slaves were sold to Dutch and Portuguese Jewish merchants.

The Portuguese crown authorized the slavery with papal blessing, documented in the inserts of Nicolau V Dum diversos e Divino Amorecommuniti, both of 1452, which authorized the Portuguese to reduce Africans to the condition of slaves with the intention of Christianizing. The regulation of slavery was legislated in Manueline ordinances: the adoption of slavery had been thus try to overcome the serious lack of manpower, that there was also all over Europe due to the recurrence of epidemics, many of them from Africa and the East. Until the first half of the fifteenth century, the Portuguese population was constant.

As for African governments, whether they were of religious Muslim or other native religions, as practiced slavery long before the Europeans engage in trafficking. Several African nations had their dependent economies of the slave trade and saw the slave trade with the Europeans as another business opportunity.

The earliest record of sending African slaves to Brazil dates from 1533 when Pero de Gois, Captain-Mor da Costa of Brazil, requested the King, the shipment of 17 black people for his captaincy of São Tomé (Paraíba do Sul / Macaé).

Then, by Charter of March 29, 1559, Dona Catherine of Austria, regent of Portugal, authorized each plantation owner of Brazil, with a statement by the Governor General, to import up to 120 slaves.

== How Africans were enslaved ==
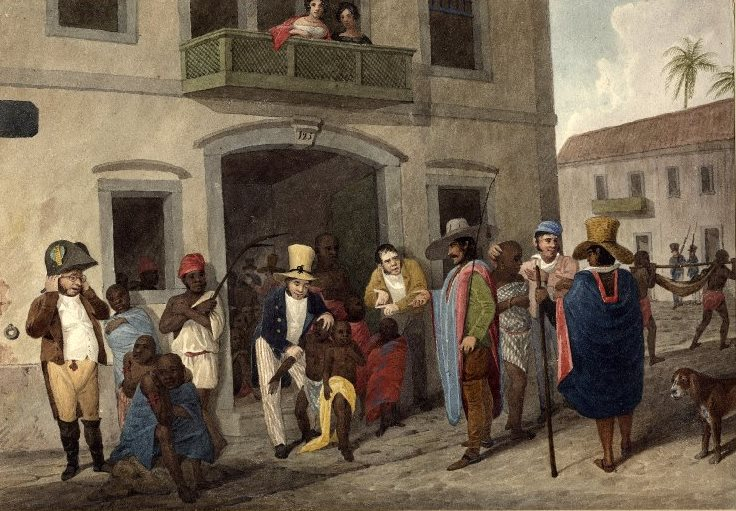
A slave market in Rio de Janeiro by Edward Francis Finden in 1824

When the Portuguese arrived in Africa, they found an African market widely implemented and quite extensive slaves.

Africans were enslaved for various reasons before being acquired:

- because they are prisoners of war;
- attachment: people were pledged as collateral for the payment of debts;
- abduction individual or a small group of people in attacking small villages;
- exchange of a member of the community for food;
- how to pay tribute to another tribal chief.

Even when they were in Africa, it is estimated that the African death rate in the path that made from the place where they were captured by the merchants of local slaves to the coast where they were sold to Europeans was greater than that which occurred during the Atlantic crossing . During the crossing, the mortality rate, although lower than on land, until the late eighteenth century remained daunting, with greater or lesser effect depending on the epidemics of riots and suicides carried out by the enslaved, the conditions prevailing on board, as well as the mood of the captain and crew of each slave ship. However, the degree to which slaves were treated in Africa was not as brutal as the abuse and exploitation by the Portuguese in the New World.

== British pressure to abolish the slave trade ==
As a condition of its support for the Empire of Brazil's independence from Portugal, the United Kingdom demanded that Brazil agree to abolish the importation of slaves from Africa; as a result the British-Brazilian Treaty of 1826 was agreed, by which Brazil promised to ban all Brazilian subjects from engaging in the trans-Atlantic slave trade, commencing in the year 1830. However, Brazil largely failed to enforce this treaty; in response, the Parliament of the United Kingdom passed the Slave Trade (Brazil) Act 1845 (8 & 9 Vict. c. 122), authorizing British warships to board all Brazilian flagged vessels and detain those found to be carrying slaves. This British action was highly unpopular in Brazil, and was widely viewed as a violation of Brazil's sovereignty; however, the Brazilian government concluded that they could not afford a war with Britain over the issue, hence in September 1850, new legislation outlawing the slave trade was enacted, and the Brazilian government began to enforce it.

== Resistance ==
Some enslaved Africans were able to escape and establish settlements, known as quilombo. One of these was the Mola quilombo which consisted of approximately 300 formerly enslaved people and had a high degree of political, social and military organization. Felipa Maria Aranha was the first leader of the community. The group was also led by Maria Luiza Piriá. It was organised as a republic, with democratic voting in place. Over the course of the Mola quilombo's life, it expanded to include four other similar settlements in the region and was known as the Confederação do Itapocu. Historians, such as Benedita Pinto and Flávio Gomes, interpret the organisation of the group as an ideal model of resistance to slavery.

== See also ==
- Valongo Wharf
- Quilombo
- Afro-Brazilian history
- Manuel Pinto da Fonseca (slave trader)
- Biography and the Black Atlantic
