= Racial equality =

Equality for all races and ethnicities

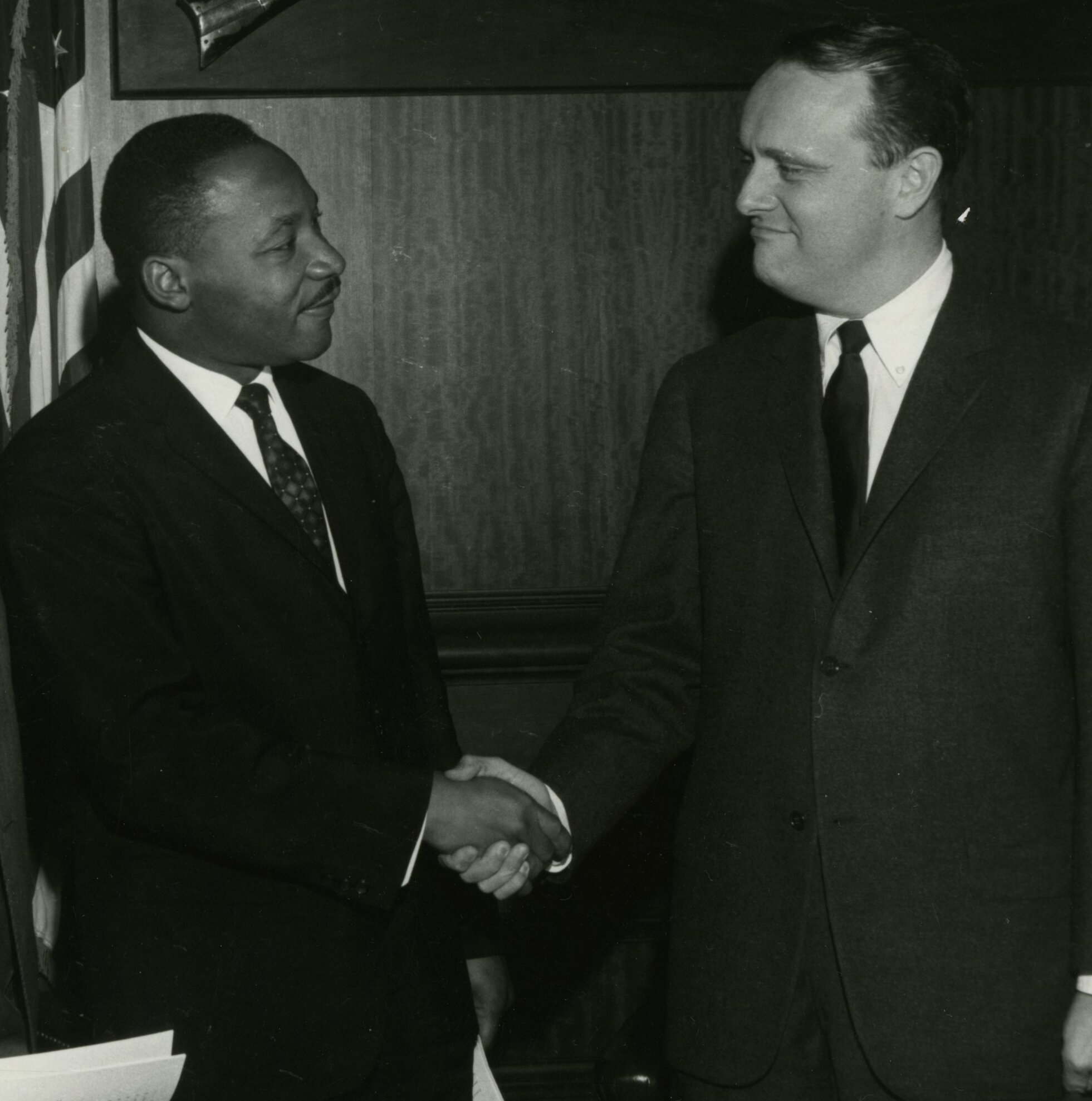
Civil rights leader Martin Luther King Jr. (left) shakes hands with Ned Breathitt, governor of Kentucky

Racial equality is when people of all races and ethnicities are treated in an egalitarian/equal manner. Racial equality occurs when institutions give individuals legal, moral, and political rights. In present-day Western society, equality among races continues to become normative. Prior to the early 1960s, attaining equality was difficult for African, Asian, and Indigenous people. However, in more recent years, legislation is being passed ensuring that all individuals receive equal opportunities in treatment, education, employment, and other areas of life. Racial equality can refer to equal opportunities or formal equality based on race or refer to equal representation or equality of outcomes for races, also called substantive equality.

== Background ==
=== American Civil War ===
In 1860, a third of all people in the Southern United States were slaves. Among other things, the American Civil War was fought to end this, and in September 1862, President Abraham Lincoln issued the Emancipation Proclamation which abolished the practice of slavery in the United States and granted protection and legal rights to recently freed Blacks.

== Struggle of black society ==
=== Post–Civil War equality ===
Three million slaves were freed as a result of the American Civil War. Despite their having been freed, blacks still faced much discrimination and were forced into dependence on white landowners. Segregation was common in everyday life, such as in segregation of schools, healthcare and housing, especially so in the South. In addition, Black Americans were a common target of racial violence, and they would not receive equal treatment by the justice system. This effectively made them second-class citizens.

=== Health ===
Where one lived often determined their access to basic healthcare. The poor inner-city areas lacked the necessary health care that was available in other areas. Inner cities' isolation from other parts of society was a large contributor to the poor health of the residents. Also, the overcrowded living conditions added to the poor health of the residents through the spread of infectious diseases.

== Influences of equality ==
=== People ===
==== Martin Luther King Jr. ====
Martin Luther King Jr. is known as a civil rights leader in the United States concerning racial equality. Martin Luther King Jr. became one of the greatest leaders due to his stance concerning various mistreated black men and women in the South. Moreover, he played many roles in society and won an award for the movement he conducted. Martin Luther King Jr. not only took part in the Montgomery bus boycott, became a key speaker at the March on Washington, and was one of the youngest individuals to win the Nobel Peace Prize, but he also peacefully handled his opinion. King kept his anger toward the idea of segregation of race to himself; however, he did show his passion for equality in his speeches and peaceful protest.

King displayed his very first civil rights movement by voluntarily taking a stance in the Montgomery bus boycott. The bus boycott had started by Rosa Parks refusing to give up her seat for a white male after a long and tiring day at work. Thus, after Park's arrest, King gathered the blacks in hopes of boycotting the bus, by cutting the use of transportation. This boycott continued for 382 days. Although King had to overcome many attacks against him such as arrest and violent harassment, the result was their first victory: black men and women were allowed to ride the buses in Montgomery equally as the whites.

==== Rosa Parks ====
Rosa Parks was born on February 4, 1913, in Montgomery, Alabama. She attended the all-black Alabama State College, and soon worked at the National Association for the Advancement of Colored People (NAACP) as a secretary. Rosa Parks had become an activist for an event that triggered other events to occur. On December 1, 1955 Parks had taken the bus home from work when all of a sudden she was forced to give up her seat for a white male. Rosa Parks had been frustrated with the way black individuals were treated; thus, she refused and was arrested and fined $14.

Parks' refusal and arrest had caused a dilemma for white individuals, especially for the ones that owned the bus business. A boycott of the Montgomery bus system was started, with the goal of desegregating public transportation. Moreover, Martin Luther King Jr. had gotten involved to not only motivate the mistreated black population but to share his passion for equality. This boycott lasted 382 days and ended on December 21, 1956. At the end of the bus boycott, both Rosa Parks and Martin Luther King Jr. had become national heroes. Furthermore, the Supreme Court declared it unconstitutional to segregate seats in Montgomery buses.

=== Religious institutions ===
The Church of God held that "interracial worship was a sign of the true Church", with both whites and blacks ministering regularly in Church of God congregations, which invited people of all races to worship there. Those who were entirely sanctified testified that they were "saved, sanctified, and prejudice removed." Though outsiders would sometimes attack Church of God services and camp meetings for their stand for racial equality, Church of God members were "undeterred even by violence" and "maintained their strong interracial position as the core of their message of the unity of all believers".

== Groups and organizations ==
=== Southern Christian Leadership Conference (SCLC) ===
Martin Luther King Jr. was the founder of SCLC, having summoned various numbers of black leaders in 1957. He became the President of this activist group and decided to improve communities by managing peaceful protests and boycotts regarding the social ethics of discrimination and segregation between races.

=== National Association of the Advancement of Colored People (NAACP) ===
First created on February 12, 1909, in Springfield, Illinois. This group was against the violence that was directed toward blacks. Their objective was to eliminate racial inequality, and guarantee political, educational, social, and economic equality for citizens. Their office was located in New York. Moorfield Storey was named president, while Du Bois was the only black Director of Publications.

=== Congress of Racial Equality ===
There was a civil rights group called the Congress of Racial Equality (CORE) that came together to fight corruption and segregation in a nonviolent manner. CORE grew profoundly after the 1950s, beginning with James Farmer who later became the leader of the group and a civil rights activist in 1941. He went back to his "Native South" and visited a local movie theater, where he came upon the "crow's nest", an area that was reserved for blacks. He opposed the Jim Crow laws, but he realized that he and his friends supported those laws by what they did in their daily actions. He soon wrote a memo and summoned the formation of a group of individuals that were powerful in mind and body to be able to take personal nonviolent actions to end discrimination.

CORE was established in 1942 in Chicago. It was a branch of a "Peace-Lover" organization, which was called the Fellowship of Reconciliation (FOR). CORE used nonviolent actions that involved sit-ins, which were done on lunch counters in Chicago. By 1947, CORE contributed with an interracial bus ride across the upper part of the South. They were testing state buses that the US Supreme Court ordered to be desegregated, which was the Morgan v. Virginia decision in 1946. This led to some success for the facilities that were testing out the orders they were given, but it didn't grab much attention, especially at the national level, which was their main goal. By 1960, there was a new wave of nonviolent direct action protests initiated through the student sit-in movement. CORE's national director James Farmer repeated the Journey of Reconciliation. Another Supreme Court ruling, Boynton v. Virginia (1960), ordered a stop to segregation in the interstate bus terminals. That came to be the Freedom Rides. The Freedom Riders traveled deep into the south and were attacked by segregationists along with Alabama.

CORE began in the North and was mainly concentrated in public areas. About two decades ago, the North had segregated spots where blacks were not allowed. Those places, for example, were restaurants, bowling alleys, skating rinks, and barber shops. More successful efforts were the work settings where there were some experiments with interracial workers and in housing co-operatives. CORE's main focus was to increase public recognition in the north. In the late 1940s and early 1950s, CORE moved to the border states of Missouri, Maryland, and Oklahoma.

=== Accomplishments of CORE and NAACP ===
In the first few weeks of April, the two groups CORE and NAACP combined forces to make a change in racial equality. Both groups of protesters constructed a plan to shut down construction of the city's Municipal Services Building, by marching in front of Mayor James Tate's North Philadelphia row house. Furthermore, many protesters had engaged in various fights involving police and white unionists. Moreover, the two groups had caused many debates to open up regarding racial politics, discrimination, and employment.

==== Technique ====
CORE's technique was always nonviolence as the method of fighting racial injustice. CORE was the first organization to use nonviolent actions to stop many issues that affected the black community. The student sit-ins started in February 1960. Within the year, 130 eating locations opened up in the southern communities. They were interested in how CORE approached the issue of segregation.

==== Expansion ====
CORE grew in the early 1940s, but continued to be composed of small groups. They persisted in being small because of the students who were part of the organization. The students would graduate and move away. Also, others were fighting for a specific cause and once the issue has been dealt with, they disappeared. CORE was only a voluntary organization; there was no paid staff.

==== Main goals ====
In the South:

- Desegregation
- Voter registration

In the North:

- Better jobs
- Better housing
- School integration

Many outsiders started to notice the efforts of the group. They supported them and started the Freedom Rides. CORE was more involved in the black power movement around the mid-1960s. Then things shifted to integration and nonviolent actions toward the organization of communities, the separation of the people, and black power. Also, as whites and blacks started to work together to fight over the dilemmas of segregation, white liberals weren't fond of the idea that they were working together. CORE's issues changed over time, so they worked on different actions that would come up.

== Protests ==
=== Sit-ins ===
Sit-ins, the oldest technique, have been used by CORE the most. CORE divided people into three different groups: one with all black individuals, one with all whites, and one that was interracial. These three different groups would go to a segregated eating area before the busiest hour and wait to be attended quietly. This was used to open up restaurants, and was later used for other locations.

=== Standing in line ===
This was used at cafeterias, ticket booths, and other places where one stands in a line to be served. If someone is refused, the CORE members who might be in line before him/her will also refuse to step out of line and interrupt service. CORE did this at movie theaters in Kentucky, and a swimming pool at Palisades Amusement Park in New Jersey. This technique was also important for stopping segregation.

== In the 21st century ==
=== Attitudes ===
Since 1942, two particular issues have evolved in racial equality. One is the handling of blacks to ensure equality, which was favored by the White American community, and the other is the differences between Southerners and non-Southerners. These two issues were observed by the National Opinion Research Center (NORC). They made questions that plotted five main topics that targeted blacks at the time. The five points that affected racial equality and tracked during the years 1965–1980 were year, region, cohort, and education. Many educational systems in the south and non-southern areas were in favor of segregated educational institutions among blacks. They also didn't want blacks near their neighborhood or interracial marriages to happen.

Demographic changes in the United States have led to more distrust and fear of non-white racial minorities. Discussing the decreasing White American population and the proportional increase in negative racial attitudes, Maureen Craig, Julian Rucker, and Jennifer Richeson explain, "For example, Whites who reside in areas with larger racial minority populations tend to express greater perceived threat, more racial bias, and less support for racial integration than Whites living in areas with smaller minority populations." In other words, increasing racial diversity can lead to increased racial bias and discrimination. Evidence suggests, however, that positive contact between two racial groups can promote racial equality. Interacting with minority groups can reduce feelings of threat and increase trust between racial groups. In general, racial diversity within a neighborhood creates a more inclusive feeling and promotes trust. However, racial diversity on large, city-wide scales has been shown to produce greater levels of prejudice.

One potential source of negative racial attitudes towards blacks specifically is biological racism, or the idea that perceived differences between races can be attributed to biological differences. A 2019 analysis of responses to a 2016 voter study found that 57% of respondents believe that black people are inherently lazier than white people. The same study found that throughout Obama's presidency, there was a continually increasing negative relationship between racial prejudice and support for racial equality policies such as equal opportunity employment, school desegregation, etc. Therefore, although the true percentage of American's who believe in a biological basis for race is unknown and difficult to determine accurately, prejudice predicated on biological differences between races continues to shape American politics. White supremacist groups notably cite racial differences between whites and nonwhites to justify white superiority. In fact, some researchers argue that the increased media attention granted to white supremacy groups could positively correlate with biologically racist beliefs.

=== State of racial equality ===
Although the adoption of the UDHR has led to increased racial equality, racism and racial inequality persist in nearly all countries. Discrimination on the basis of race leads racial minorities to receive less job opportunities than their white peers, decreased access to educational and healthcare resources, and higher rates of incarceration. While writing on the failures of Brown v. Board of Education, Jody Heymann, Aleta Sprague, and Amy Raub noted that "From 1988 to 2014, the percentage of 'hyper-segregated schools,' in which 90% or more of the students are minorities, grew from 5.7% to 18.4%." This shows that despite the efforts of the Supreme Court, segregation continues to exist in some American schools. The gap in resources and opportunities available between white communities and racial minorities is large; on average, white communities receive three times more than the least-privileged minority communities. Indirect forms of discrimination continue to exist many ways. One noteworthy form of indirect racial discrimination is pretrial risk assessment tests. Risk assessment tests are algorithmic attempts to measure the likelihood of recidivism in previously incarcerated persons. Despite being created to remove the threat of racial bias from risk assessment tests, these algorithms have been found to overestimate the recidivism rate in blacks and underestimate the recidivism rate in White Americans. These tests, similar to Jim Crow era literacy tests, are not outwardly discriminatory towards blacks, they appear to be race-neutral, however the danger lies in the fact that the designers of said risk assessment tools conflate risk with a distrust of authority, and the oppressive social and political conditions that can lead one to committing crimes. This methodology is inherently flawed because oppressed racial minorities are more likely to be critical of the institutions that oppress them.

Many countries, however, have found success in promoting racial equality through their constitution and legislature. Countries such as Brazil, Colombia, and South Africa ensured racial equality in their constitutions by writing them in cooperation with marginalized minority communities. Other countries' (including Canada, Mexico, the UK, India, etc.) constitutions include provisions that allow affirmative action to be taken in the name of promoting racial equality in the future, and mending the racial inequality of the past. For example, in response to the inequality of the caste system, India's constitution was written specifically to provide proportional legislative representation to members of previously oppressed castes. The original clause in the Indian constitution only provided this representation for a period of 10 years but it has been continually renewed every 10 years since its inception.

== United States laws ==
=== Thirteenth Amendment ===
The Thirteenth Amendment to the United States Constitution was passed on January 31, 1865, with the intention to abolish slavery and involuntary servitude in all states, except as punishment for a crime. As a result, many people, particularly in the South, abused the poorly written amendment. To further explain, an article from the Gettysburg College, states, "Many in Congress believed that slavery was detrimental to white laborers in the South because slaves were seen as a long term investment, and white laborers were unable to make advancements because slavery was less expensive in the long run." In elaboration, the thirteenth amendment was only set to abolish slavery legally, however, with further knowledge of what happened, it was seen that many people took advantage of the second statement of this amendment and set into place convict lease programs, which allowed for a subtle form of slavery, and was not legally abolished until the late 1900s.

=== Fourteenth Amendment ===
The Fourteenth Amendment was passed in 1868 and allowed citizenship for anyone born on US soil regardless of race. Just like the other reconstruction amendments, the fourteenth amendment was not popular amongst the southern states and faced a lot of backlash, since it gave previously enslaved people individual rights.

=== Fifteenth Amendment ===
The Fifteenth Amendment (1870) made it illegal for any state to deny people the right to vote regardless of their race, ethnicity, or any previous servitude. This amendment was surprisingly supported by both the North and the South of the United States. This was mainly because the Northern states had a great amount of black Male suffrage movements, and the Southern States figured the black population can add more votes for Southern view points.

=== Supreme Court cases ===
Plessy v. Ferguson (1896) was a landmark decision issued by the supreme court that ruled the act of segregation to be constitutional as long as it was separate but equal. To further explain, "The decision also recognized and justified the power of individual states to enforce their state segregation laws. As a result, the decision has had implications for such issues as the definition of blackness, the acknowledgment of gradients of whiteness, the significance of citizenship, and the interpretation of the state’s regulatory role in the separation of races in public space."

Brown v. Board of Education (1952) was a Supreme Court decision following Plessy V. Ferguson that decided that separation cannot be equal in schools, therefore, segregation was unconstitutional. Many people believe that this supreme court case was responsible for desegregation in schools, however, the court decision had no direct impact, and schools remained largely segregated. Schools were allowed to take as much time needed to desegregate, delaying any reconstruction towards racial equality amongst blacks and White Americans.

Loving v. Virginia (1967) was a Supreme Court decision that allowed for interracial marriage in the United States. It made any laws banning this right unconstitutional.

=== Civil Rights Act of 1964 ===
The Civil Rights Act of 1964 was set in place as consequence to the civil rights movement and protests, primarily led by people such as Martin Luther King Jr., and many others. "In 1964 the federal government issued the Civil Rights Act, which barred racial discrimination based on race, sex, religion, or national identity. This act snatched crucial power from many southern states because in effect it reversed the 1896 Plessy v. Ferguson ruling by declaring racial segregation unacceptable and unconstitutional."

=== Jim Crow laws ===
Jim Crow laws, which were placed in the late 19th century, were enforced in the South in order to separate blacks and White Americans. These laws primarily focused on the separation in the workplace and mindset. During these times, it was difficult for blacks to find jobs and sustain a family, which resulted in poverty. It was also easier for blacks to be punished for any harmless activity, and lead to racial injustice, despite the amendments and supreme court cases. The Jim Crow laws were abolished in the 1960s.

== See also ==
- Ministry of Racial Equality (Brazil)
- Ministry of Diaspora Affairs and Combating Antisemitism (Israel)
- Racial inequality in the United States
- Racial segregation in the United States
- Racism in the United States
- Social equality
- Social justice
