= Edson Santos =

Brazilian sociologist and politician

Édson Santos
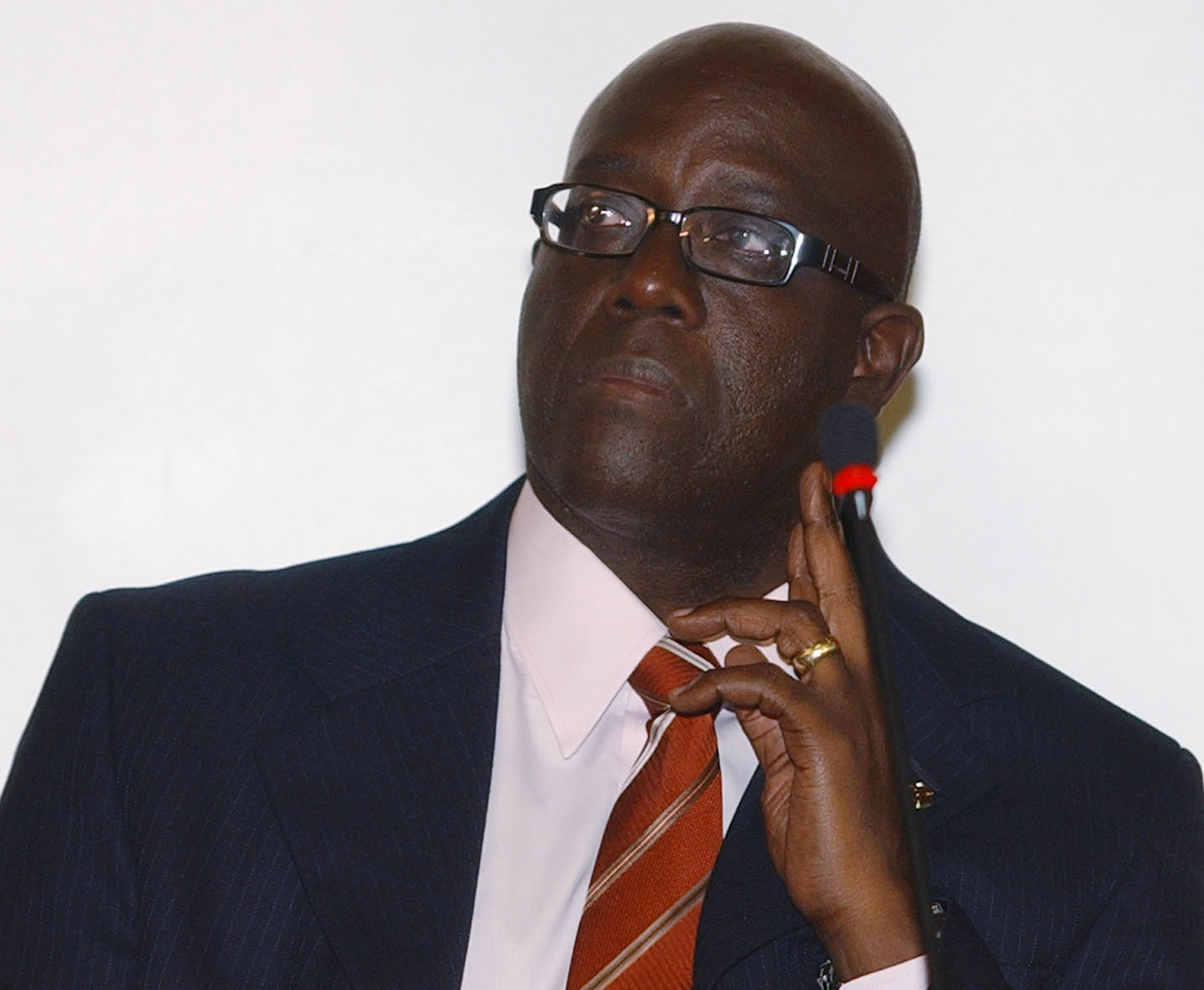
- Édson Santos in 2008

Minister of Racial Equality
- In office 20 February 2008 – 31 March 2010
- Preceded by: Matilde Ribeiro
- Succeeded by: Eloi Ferreira

Councilman of Rio de Janeiro
- Incumbent
- Assumed office 1 February 2023
- In office 1 January 1989 – 31 January 2007

Federal deputy of Rio de Janeiro
- In office 1 February 2007 – 31 January 2015

Personal details
- Born: Édson Santos de Souza; 21 July 1954 (age 72) Rio de Janeiro, Brazil
- Party: PCdoB (1985–1994); PT (1994–2021); PSB (2021–2023); PT (2023–present)
- Occupation: Sociologist, politician

Édson Santos de Souza (born 21 July 1954) is a Brazilian sociologist and politician. He has been a city councilor in Rio de Janeiro since 2023, a post he previously occupied from 1989 to 2007. He has also been vice-president of the municipal chamber. He was also a federal deputy from the state of Rio de Janeiro from 2007 to 2015, and the chief minister of the Ministry of Racial Equality from 2008 to 2010. He is currently affiliated with the Workers' Party (PT). He is noted for his long-standing presence in decisions made for racial equality during his time as minister.

== Biography ==
Santos was born in the Rio de Janeiro neighborhood of Horto. He studied social sciences at Rio de Janeiro State University at the beginning of the 1980s, during which he was also director of the National Union of Students. He was also president of the Council of Residents of Cidade de Deus, where he had lived for 10 years.

He had been affiliated with the Communist Party of Brazil (PCdoB) from 1985 to 1994, and began to affiliate with the Workers' Party thereafter. He had been a member of the party's national directory from 2006 onward. He was a city councilor in Rio de Janeiro for the first time from 1989 to 2007, for 4 consecutive mandates. He was vice-president and later president of the Permanent Commission on Transport and Transit of the municipal chamber from 1993 to 1996. He earned a master's degree in business administration from the Instituto Alberto Luiz Coimbra of the Federal University of Rio de Janeiro (UFRJ). He was elected second vice-president of the chamber in 2005 and was also president of the Parliamentary Front in Defense of Peoples' Housing. He participated in 16 parliamentary inquiries. He supported the law that created the Municipal Council of Urban Politics; the law that created a city-wide holiday on the day that quilombo leader and famed rebel leader against slavery Zumbi dos Palmares was killed, also known as Black Awareness Day; and the law that created reduced prices for students to cultural events.

He was a candidate to become senator for the state of Rio de Janeiro in 2002, receiving 1.8 million votes, reaching 4th place, ahead of established politicians such as Artur da Távola and Leonel Brizola. In 2006, he was elected federal deputy as part of the PT. In 2007, he was responsible for the installation of a monument dedicated to João Cândido, the leader of the Revolt of the Lash, in the gardens of the Museu da República, behind Catete Palace and facing the Atlantic Ocean. In 2008, when he was contemplating becoming a candidate for mayor of Rio de Janeiro, he was chosen by the federal government to become the Special Secretariat for Policies to Promote Racial Equality. He succeeded Matilde Ribeiro, who by that point had become mired in scandal.

On 31 March 2010, he left the government to run again as federal deputy, being elected again to serve. He lost reelection in 2014.

With the election of 3 candidates from the PT who were previously in the municipal chamber, namely candidates Lindbergh Farias and Reimont Otoni to the federal Chamber of Deputies, and substitute Elika Takimoto to the state assembly, Santos went on to assume a post with the municipal assembly once more as a second substitute, beginning his term on 1 February 2023.
