= Matilde Ribeiro =

Brazilian social worker and political activist

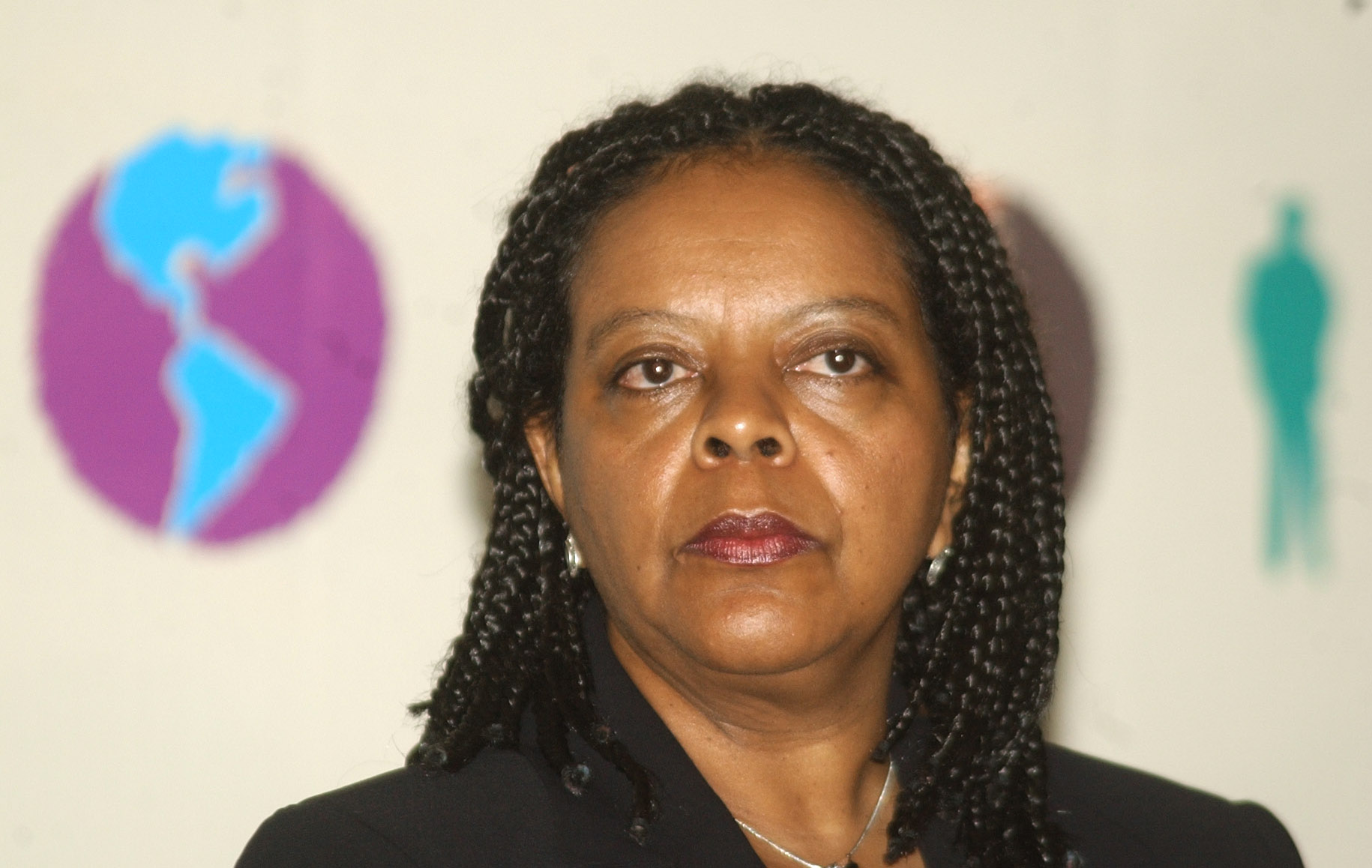
- Born: July 29, 1960 (age 65); Flórida Paulista, São Paulo, Brazil
- Education: Pontifical Catholic University of São Paulo
- Occupation: Social activist
- Title: Former Chief Minister of the SEPPIR
- Term: 2003-2008
- Political party: Workers' Party (Brazil)

Matilde Ribeiro (born July 29, 1960, in Flórida Paulista) is a Brazilian social worker and political activist. In 2008, she was Chief Minister of the SEPPIR in the first presidency of Lula da Silva. She is noteworthy for promoting racial quotas to address systemic inequality in Brazil.

== Career ==
Born in a low-income family, she graduated with a degree in social work from the Pontifical Catholic University of São Paulo. She published articles in various feminist journals such as Estudos feministas. After graduating, she worked with the Workers' Party (PT) and worked on their campaign for the 2002 Brazilian general election, which won her an invitation from the victorious Lula da Silva. From 21 March 2003 until 6 February 2008, she served as the Special Secretariat for Policies to Promote Racial Equality (Portuguese: Secretaria de Políticas de Promoção da Igualdade Racial, SEPPIR), which has ministerial status.

She was in Manaus in April 2005 at the first State Conference for the Promotion of Racial Equality, which was marked by protests of the mestizo movement against the policy of non-recognition of Caboclon identity. In 2007, she was serving as Minister for Racial Equality.

She drew controversy for stating in a BBC interview that "it's not racism when a black person rebels against a white person," and that "[a] black person's reaction of not wanting to live with a white person, or not liking a white person, […] is natural." Federal prosecutors investigated her on charges of inciting racial violence but found, when presented with the full interview, that her words had been taken out of context.

Following this controversy, new reporting alleged that Ribeiro had the largest credit card reimbursements of any of Brazil's ministers, said to be seven times greater than the second highest spender. AfroPress accused the news media of racism, saying that such credit cards were available to thousands of civil servants with far higher expenditures in total. In February 2008, she resigned from office, pressured by the media over these irregular expenditures. She was succeeded by Edson Santos.

More recently she has been employed as an assistant professor at the University for International Integration of the Afro-Brazilian Lusophony.
