= Bakwa-Kalonji =

- Location in the Democratic Republic of the Congo
- Coordinates: 4.35°S 20.72°E
- Country: DR Congo
- Province: Kasai
- Territory: Ilebo

Population (2004)
  - Total: 58,092
- Time zone: UTC+2 (Central Africa Time)

Bakwa-Kalonji is a town with an estimated population of 58,092 located in Kasai province of the Democratic Republic of the Congo. It is located 19 kilometers (12 mi) east of Ilebo on the RN20 road to Mweka. The elevation of the town is estimated to be 462 meters above sea level.
