= Luiza Helena de Bairros =

Brazilian politician

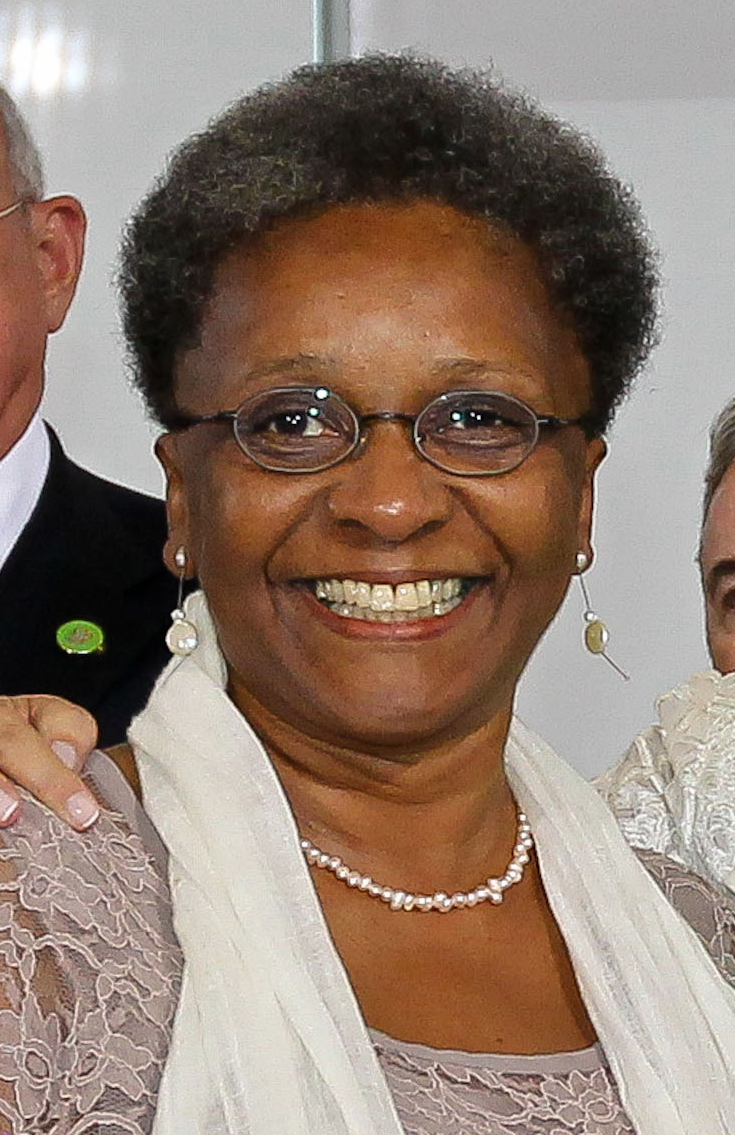

Minister of Racial Equality
- In office 1 January 2011 – 1 January 2015
- Preceded by: Eloi Ferreira
- Succeeded by: Nilma Lino Gomes

Personal details
- Born: Luiza Helena de Bairros; 15 June 1959 Porto Alegre, Brazil
- Died: 12 July 2016 (aged 63) Porto Alegre, Brazil
- Education: Federal University of Rio Grande do Sul
- Occupation: Administrator

Luiza Helena de Bairros (27 March 1953 – 12 July 2016) was a Brazilian administrator and sociologist. She was the chief minister of the Special Secretariat for Policies to Promote Racial Equality between 2011 and 2014.

== Biography ==
Bairros was born in Porto Alegre but made her political career in the state of Bahia. She held a business degree from the Federal University of Rio Grande do Sul, a master's degree in social sciences from the Federal University of Bahia and a doctorate in sociology from the University of Michigan.

Bairros participated in United Nations Development Programme projects to fight racism. From 2008, she was the Bahia State Secretary of Racial Equality Promotion under governor Jaques Wagner, when she was invited by President Dilma Rousseff to join her cabinet in 2011.

Bairros died on 12 July 2016 of lung cancer.
