= COPPE =

Research center at the Federal University of Rio de Janeiro

The Alberto Luiz Coimbra Institute for Graduate Studies and Research in Engineering (Portuguese: Instituto Alberto Luiz Coimbra de Pós-Graduação e Pesquisa em Engenharia), often referred to as Coppe due to its original name (Coordenação dos Programas de Pós-Graduação e Pesquisa de Engenharia), is a research and learning center in the Center of Technology (CT) of the Federal University of Rio de Janeiro (UFRJ). It has over 2,500 students in its 13 graduate engineering programs (Master's and Doctorate).

== Overview ==
Coppe is Latin America's largest center for research and education in engineering. It was founded in 1963 by the engineer Alberto Luiz Coimbra. Coppe has more than 100 facilities. The knowledge accumulated in Coppe’s facilities is channeled to the economic, technologic and social development of Brazil through contracts and agreements with companies, governments, and NGOs. These contracts are administered by the Coppetec Foundation. Since its creation in 1970, the Coppetec Foundation has administered more than 10,000 contracts and partnerships with national and international, private and state-owned companies and governmental and non-governmental agencies.

In 1994, Coppe created its technology-based Business Incubator. Coppe stimulated the establishment of the Federal University’s Science Park, which is located in the Fundão Island.

== Departments ==
Coppe offers thirteen graduate programs:

- Biomedical Engineering
- Ocean Engineering
- Energy Planning
- Civil Engineering
- Production Engineering
- Chemical Engineering
- Systems Engineering and Computer Science
- Electrical Engineering
- Nuclear Engineering
- Mechanical Engineering
- Transportation Engineering
- Metallurgical and Materials Engineering
- Nanotechnology Engineering

== See also ==
- UFRJ
- Escola Politécnica da UFRJ
- Education in Brazil
- Brazil University Rankings
- Universities and Higher Education in Brazil
