= Special Secretariat for Policies to Promote Racial Equality =

Special Secretariat for Policies to Promote Racial Equality (Portuguese: Secretaria Nacional de Políticas de Promoção da Igualdade Racial, SEPPIR) is a government agency in Brazil. The agency has been headed by Luiza Helena de Bairros and Edson Santos. It was created in 2003.

The National Council for the Promotion of Racial Equality, established in 2003 advises it.

== Background ==
Brazil took in the most slaves of any country in the Americas and was the last to outlaw slavery in 1888. Afro-Brazilians and their descendants have faced discrimination and many live in poverty. Luiz Inácio Lula da Silva made addressing the issues a priority.

== Bolsonaro era ==
Incoming minister of family affairs and human rights Damares Alves said the agency will continue its mission in Jair Bolsonaro's administration.

== See also ==
- Quilombola
- Benedita da Silva
- Sueli Carneiro

== Website ==
- SEPPIR website
