= Conselho Nacional dos Direitos das Pessoas LGBTQIA+ =

Brazilian executive council

The National Council for the Rights of Lesbian, Gay, Bisexual, Travesti, Transsexual, Queer, Intersex, Asexual and Other People, formerly the National Council for Combating Discrimination and Promoting the Rights of Lesbians, Gays, Bisexuals, Travestis and Transsexuals (Conselho Nacional de Combate à Discriminação LGBT, CNCD/LGBT) until 2018, is an executive council under the Ministry of Human Rights and Citizenship. It is located in Brasília, in the Federal District, in Brazil.

The decree says the council's goal is to "formulate and propose guidelines for government actions at the national level aimed at combating discrimination and promoting and defending the rights of lesbian, gay, bisexual, travesti and transgender people." The body is composed of officials from 15 government ministries and representatives of 15 non-governmental organizations.

"The creation of the council is something that ABGLT has been pushing for and is a victory for civil society and the Lula government," said Toni Reis, president of the Brazilian Association of Gays, Lesbians, Bisexuals, Travestis and Transsexuals. "This shows respect for the deliberations of the first National LGBT Conference, held in June 2008, and will be a means of ensuring social control over the execution of the 166 actions contained in the National Plan for the Promotion of LGBT Citizenship and Human Rights."

== History ==
The federal LGBTQ council created on December 9, 2010, by the Presidential Decree Nº 7.388 of Luiz Inácio Lula da Silva and Human Rights Secretary Paulo Vannuchi. The body was headed by Gustavo Bernardes. The body last met in 2018 prior to the inauguration of Jair Bolsonaro as president.

On April 7, 2023, Lula re-established the body as the National Council for the Rights of LGBTQIA+ People, a 38-member body of advisors charged with proposing policies and supporting campaigns aimed towards support for the LGBTQIA+ community in Brazil. The Ministry of Human Rights and Citizenship will be charged with funding for the council. As of 2023, it is headed by Symmy Larrat, in her role as the National Secretary for the Promotion and Defense of the Rights of LGBTQIA+ People, with Janaína Oliveira serving as vice-president.

The council participates in the National LGBT Conference, held in 2008, 2011, 2016 and 2025.

== List of presidents ==
	Tenure	Notes
Ramais de Castro Silveira	2011	
Keila Simpson	2011-2013	
Gustavo Bernardes	2013-2016	
Zezinho do Prado	2016-2018	
Washington Luiz Dias	2018	
Symmy Larrat	1 January 2023-present	Concurrently National Secretary for the Promotion and Defense of the Rights of LGBTQIA+ People

== See also ==
- International LGBT Association
- LGBTQ history in Brazil
- LGBTQ rights in Brazil
- LGBTQ rights organization
- OutRage! (UK)
- Stonewall (UK)
