= Keila Simpson =

Brazilian travesti activist

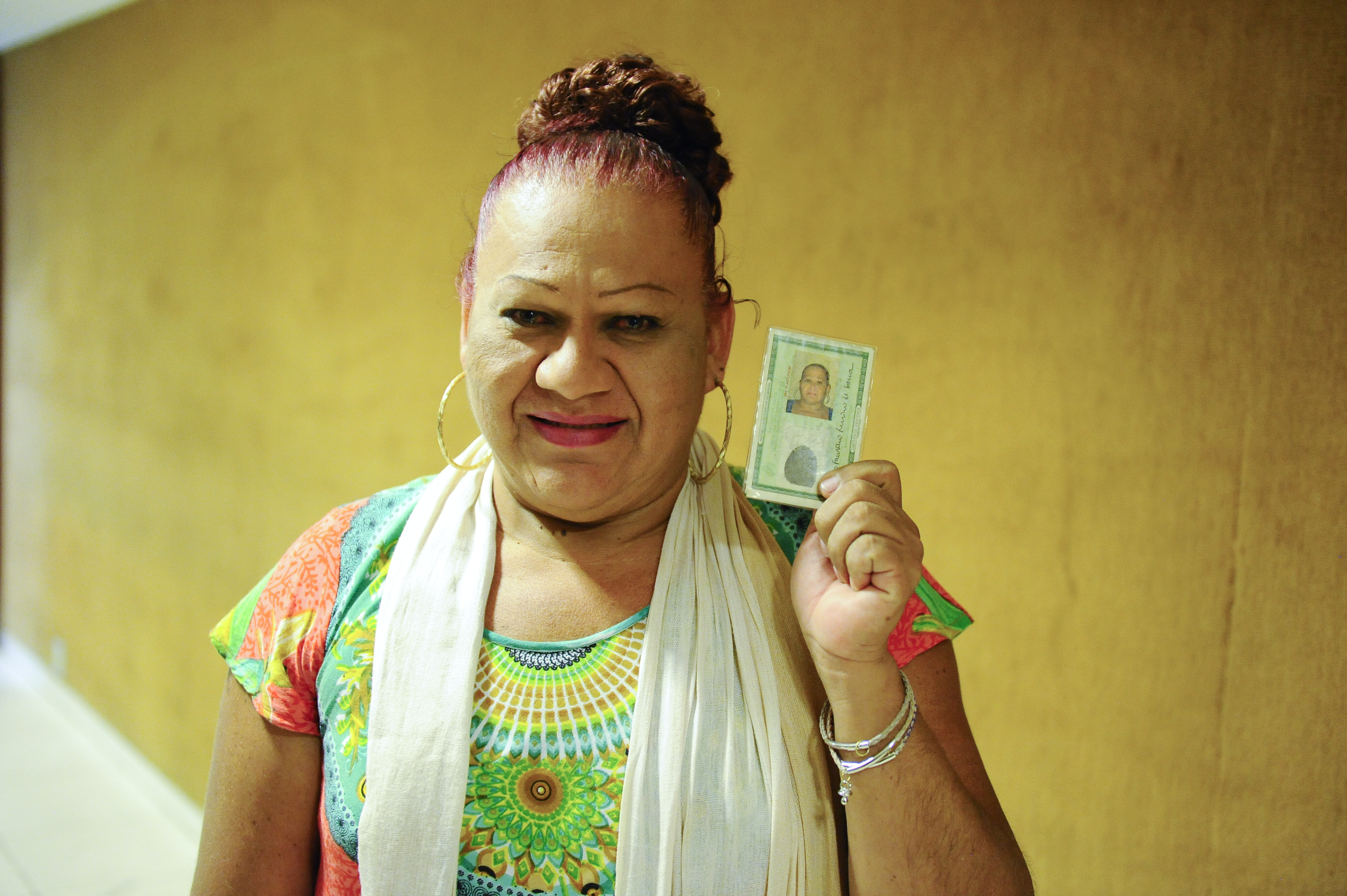
- Born: 16 April 1966 (age 60); Pedreiras, Maranhão, Brazil
- Occupation: Activist

Keila Simpson (Pedreiras, born in 1965 or 1966) is an LGBTQ activist considered one of the most important in Brazil. In 1998, she founded the Associação Nacional de Travestis e Transexuais. She is the first travesti to be awarded an honorary doctorate in Brazil.

== Career ==
Born in Pedreiras, Maranhão, Keila came out at the age of 14. Until the 1980s, she worked as a domestic servant in Teresina, the year she came into contact with prostitution. Over the years, she also lived in Recife, Pernambuco, and Salvador, Bahia, where she became more familiar with the transgender community.

In 1991, she met the founder of the Grupo Gay da Bahia, Luiz Mott. She began her activism in earnest in 1995, when she created the Associação de Travestis de Salvador, at the height of the HIV/AIDS pandemic. She created the Associação Nacional de Travestis e Transexuais three years later, which was registered as a legal entity in 2002. Currently, it is one of the most important within the movement. On 29 January 2004, she was part of the group of transsexual and transvestite activists and leaders who launched the "Travesti e Respeito" (lit. 'Travesti and Respect') campaign in the National Congress in Brasília, an unprecedented partnership with the federal government via the Ministry of Health. The act became a landmark in the history of the movement, and the date was chosen as the National Day of Trans Visibility to annually commemorate the achievements and new demands of this population.

Keila also served as vice-president of the first organization to represent the LGBTQ population in Brazil, the Associação Brasileira de Lésbicas, Gays, Bissexuais, Travestis, Transexuais e Intersexos (ABGLT); and coordinated the Center for the Promotion and Defense of LGBT Rights (CPDD LGBT), which receives complaints of violations of the rights of the LGBTQ population in Bahia. In 2013, she served as president of the Conselho Nacional de Combate à Discriminação, receiving the National Human Rights Award that same year from then-President Dilma Rousseff for her services to the LGBTQ community in Brazil.

In April 2022, Keila joined the executive board of the Brazilian Association of Non-Governmental Organizations (Abong) to represent Bahia and Sergipe. In May, she was detained upon arrival at Mexico City airport for not having her personal documents rectified (corrected after her gender transition). She was to participate in the Abong World Social Forum, where she would represent Brazil. According to her, "They deported me for being trans, not for my name." In December, she became the first transvestite to receive an Honorary Doctorate in the country from the Rio de Janeiro State University (UERJ), also being the first transgender person to receive the title in her lifetime.

On 20 June 2023, the Salvador City Council awarded her the title of Soteropolitan Citizen (Brazilian Portuguese: Cidadã Soteropolitana) due to her contributions to the city, being the first transgender woman to receive this honor.
