= Symmy Larrat =

Brazilian journalist (born 1978)

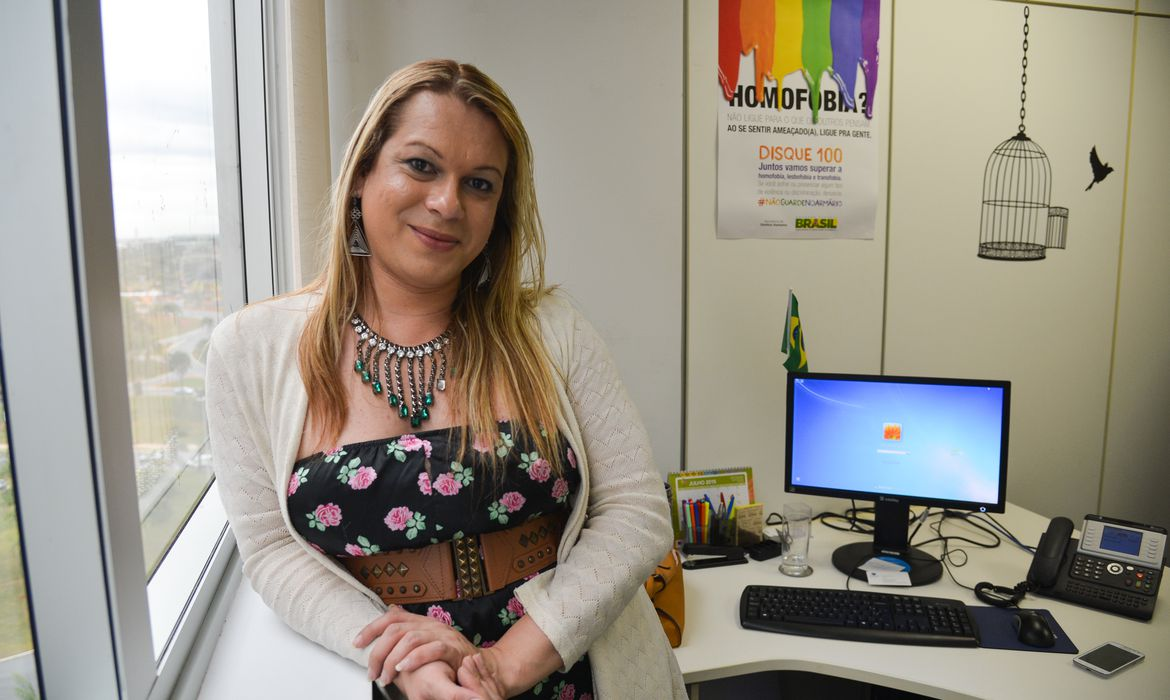
- Symmy Larrat for Agência Brasil in 2015

National Secretary for the Promotion and Defense of the Rights of LGBTQIA+ People
- Incumbent
- Assumed office 1 January 2023

President of the Associação Brasileira de Lésbicas, Gays, Bissexuais, Travestis, Transexuais e Intersexos
- In office 2017–2022

Personal details
- Born: 25 February 1978 (age 48) Cametá, Pará, Brazil
- Party: Workers' Party

Symmy Larrat Brito de Carvalho (born 25 February 1978) is a Brazilian journalist. She was president of the Associação Brasileira de Lésbicas, Gays, Bissexuais, Travestis, Transexuais e Intersexos from 2017 to 2022. Since 2023, she has served as National Secretary for the Promotion and Defense of the Rights of LGBTQIA+ People. The department is directly subordinate to the Ministry of Human Rights and Citizenship.

== Early life and career ==
Larrat began her career in social communication at the Federal University of Pará, in Belém. She was part of the student movement. At night, Larrat performed as a drag queen, and according to her, she had to deal with her feelings regarding a possible gender transition. She claimed that her role models at the time were Rogéria and Roberta Close. Even with a degree, she ended up resorting to sex work.

== Career ==
Larrat began her political career when she joined the communications department of the Secretariat of Justice and Human Rights (Sejudh) as an advisor, and then implemented a statewide LGBT network in Pará. Later, she managed Transcidadania, during Fernando Haddad's administration in São Paulo, a pioneering and internationally recognized project that focused on encouraging the trans population to enroll in school and enter the formal job market. During the Dilma Rousseff administration, Larrat was the general coordinator for the Promotion of LGBT Rights at the Secretariat of Human Rights. In 2017, Larrat assumed the presidency of the Associação Brasileira de Lésbicas, Gays, Bissexuais, Travestis, Transexuais e Intersexos (ABGLT), being reelected in 2021, being considered the first travesti to hold the position. In 2021, she was awarded the Jorge Lafond Prize, granted by Distrito Drag. Also in 2021, she announced her pre-candidacy for the Federal Chamber.

Larrat was elected by the Gay São Paulo Guide as one of the most influential LGBT people in Brazil in 2018.

On December 31, 2022, it was announced by Silvio Almeida, Minister of Human Rights and Citizenship, that Larrat would take over the unprecedented National Secretariat for LGBTQIA+ Rights.
