= Curitiba Pride =

Annual LGBTQ event in Curitiba, Brazil

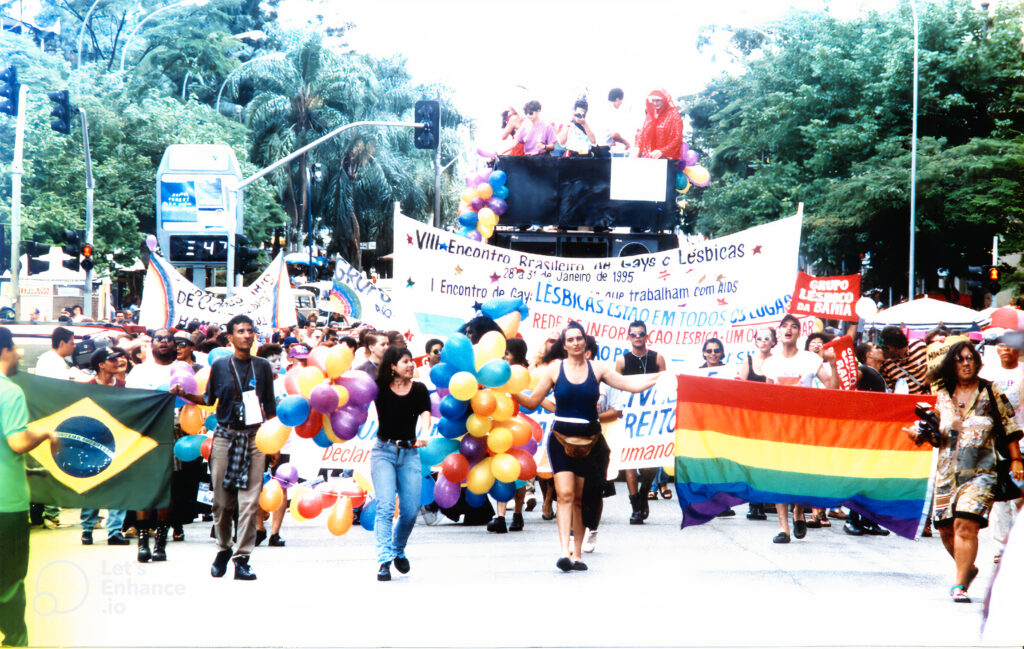
The first Curitiba Diversity Parade, 1995

The Diversity Parade (Brazilian Portuguese: Parada da Diversidade) and the Diversity March (Brazilian Portuguese: Marcha pela Diversidade) of Curitiba are annual events held in the capital of the Brazilian state of Paraná, aimed at promoting the visibility of sexual and gender diversity. The events address themes related to the history, culture, and demands for rights of the LGBTQ population in Brazil. The event is often cited as one of the first LGBTQ pride parades held in Brazil. The events usually take place between 19 de Dezembro Square and Nossa Senhora de Salete Square, in front of the Legislative Assembly of Paraná.

== History ==
Initially known as the Gay Parade or the GLT Parade (gays, lesbians, and travestis), its first edition took place on January 31, 1995. The Curitiba GLT Parade was organized alongside the founding of the Associação Brasileira de Lésbicas, Gays, Bissexuais, Travestis, Transexuais e Intersexos (ABGLT), an organization that works in the defense of LGBTQ rights in the country.

The first edition was attended by approximately 500 people and 40 groups from different regions of Brazil. The gathering took place at Santos Andrade Square, and the march went through central streets of the city, including the fraternity Boca Maldita, where speeches were delivered. After its inaugural edition, Curitiba continued to host the event annually, with a gradual increase in attendance over the years. The parade has become a significant event on the city's calendar, attracting thousands of participants each year. During the 2000s, the event received increased attention from local media outlets, which contributed to the expansion of its visibility.

In 2005, the event was officially renamed Diversity Parade (Brazilian Portuguese: Parada da Diversidade), when the Associação Paranaense da Parada da Diversidade (APPAD) took over its organization. Since then, the association has been responsible for coordinating the parade, with the support of other civil society organizations. In 2015, the parade celebrated 15 years of existence, registering a record number of participants. The following year, Grupo Dignidade, which had previously been involved in organizing the parade, began to promote another Diversity March, held alongside the main event. According to Toni Reis, executive director of the Grupo Dignidade, the march was created in reference to the International Day Against Homophobia. In later years, the mobilization also came to reference the International LGBT Pride Day.

In 2020, due to the COVID-19 pandemic, the parade was held in a virtual format. In July 2022, the Diversity March was resumed in reference to Pride Month. Later that same year, the Diversity Parade was held in November, however, the event was interrupted after Laurize Oliveira, a DJ, fell from a sound truck and died.

In August 2023, city councilor Éder Borges, of the Progressistas, introduced a bill proposing the prohibition of the participation of children and adolescents in LGBTQ events, including pride parades. The proposal was legally contested, with the City Council's legal department pointing out potential constitutional issues.

On December 10, 2023, the Diversity Parade of Curitiba was fined R$13,024.74 by the Curitiba City Hall. The penalty was imposed on the União das Lésbicas, Gays, Bissexuais, Travestis e Transexuais do Paraná (UNALGBTPR), on the grounds that the event had been held without the specific license required by municipal legislation. The organization stated that it had previously requested authorization but did not receive a response within the necessary timeframe. As a result, the event was carried out as a political demonstration on Marechal Deodoro Street, in the city center. UNALGBTPR declared that it considers the fine to be a politically motivated measure.

In 2024, Legislative Assembly of Paraná received a law proposal, by Ana Júlia Ribeiro, to recognize Diversity Parade as Intangible Cultural Heritage; another was presented in 2025 by the Municipal Chamber of Curitiba.
