= Conceição Evaristo =

Brazilian writer (born 1946)

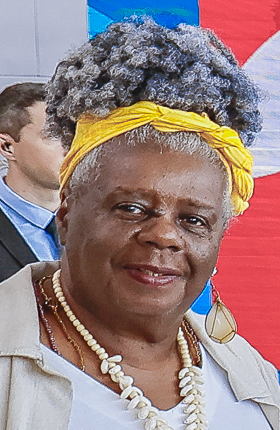
- Evaristo in 2024
- Born: Maria da Conceição Evaristo de Brito; 29 November 1946 (age 79) Belo Horizonte, Minas Gerais, Brazil
- Occupation: Writer; poet; novelist; essayist
- Education: Federal University of Rio de Janeiro (BLitt); Fluminense Federal University (MLitt)
- Genres: Novel; short story; poetry
- Literary movement: Postmodernism
- Notable works: Ponciá Vivêncio
- Notable awards: Prêmio Jabuti (2015, 3rd place); Troféu Juca Pato (2023); Order of Rio Branco (Commander)

Maria da Conceição Evaristo de Brito (/ˌkɒnseɪˈsaʊn/ kon-say-SOWN; Portuguese pronunciation: [kõsejˈsɐ̃w̃]; born 29 November 1946) is a Brazilian writer. Her work is marked by her life experiences as an Afro-Brazilian woman, which she calls escrevivência — a portmanteau of escrita (writing) and vivência (life experience). She was born into a humble family and is the second oldest of nine siblings, being the first in her household to earn a university degree. She helped her mother and aunt with washing clothes and deliveries, while studying.

In the 1970s, she moved to Rio de Janeiro, where she passed a contest, starting to write only in the 1990s. She completed her master's degree in the mid-1990s and her doctorate in the early 2010s.

She is a first cousin of Macaé Evaristo, the current Minister of Human Rights and Citizenship under the Lula government.

== Biography ==
Conceição was born in a favela in the southern area of Belo Horizonte, to a very poor family with nine brothers and her mother.

She had to work as a domestic servant during her youth until she finished her normal course in 1971, at the age of 25. She moved to Rio de Janeiro, where she was approved on a civil service exam to be a teacher and studied Letters at Federal University of Rio de Janeiro. In the 1980s, Evaristo got in touch with the Quilombhoje group. She made her debut in literature in 1990, with works published in the series Cadernos Negros, published by the organization.

She earned a master's degree in Brazilian Literature from PUC-Rio in 1996, and a PhD in Comparative Literature from Universidade Federal Fluminense in 2011. Her works, especially the novel Ponciá Vicêncio (2003), address themes such as racial, gender and class discrimination. In 2007, her first novel, Ponciá Vicêncio, became the focus of a Master's thesis in Brazil, the first one on the author. The novel was translated into English and published in the United States also in 2007. She currently teaches at UFMG as a visiting professor.

In 2018, she was nominated for a chair at the Brazilian Academy of Letters, and lost to filmmaker Cacá Diegues by 22 votes to 1. The Caribbean Philosophical Association awarded its 2018 Nicolás Guillén Lifetime Achievement Award to Conceição Evaristo.

She is a corresponding member of the Academia Espírito-santense de Letras, Vitória, Espírito Santo.

Conceição Evaristo is a great exponent of contemporary Brazilian literature. She writes about race, gender and class discrimination, especially of black women.

== Works ==
=== Novels ===
- Ponciá Vicêncio (2003)
- Becos da Memória (2006)
- Canção para Ninar Menino Grande (2022)

=== Poetry ===
- Poemas da recordação e outros movimentos (2008)

=== Short stories ===
- Insubmissas lágrimas de mulheres (Nandyala, 2011)
- Olhos d'água (Pallas, 2014)
- Histórias de leves enganos e parecenças (Editora Malê, 2016)

=== Participation in anthologies ===
- Cadernos Negros (Quilombhoje, 1990)
- Contos Afros (Quilombhoje)
- Contos do mar sem fim (Editora Pallas)
- Questão de Pele (Língua Geral)
- Schwarze prosa (Germany, 1993)
- Moving beyond boundaries: international dimension of black women's writing (1995)
- Women righting – Afro-brazilian Women's Short Fiction (England, 2005)
- Finally Us: contemporary black brazilian women writers (1995)
- Callaloo, vols. 18 e 30 (1995, 2008)
- Fourteen female voices from Brazil (USA, 2002)
- Chimurenga People (South Africa, 2007)
- Brasil-África
- Je suis Rio (Anacaona, 2016)

== Awards ==
In 2019 - Prêmio Jabuti – Shortlisted for Best Short Story with Olhos D'água.

In 2025, Conceição was awarded Doutora Honoris Causa by the Universidade Federal de Minas Gerais.

In 2026, Conceição was awarded Doutora Honoris Causa by the Universidade Federal do Rio de Janeiro.
