= Menicucci =

Menicucci is a surname. Notable people with the surname include:

- Debora Menicucci (born 1991), Venezuelan actress, model, fashion designer and beauty pageant titleholder
- Eleonora Menicucci (born 1944), Brazilian sociologist and politician
