= Liberdade de Amor entre Mulheres no Ceará =

Brazilian lesbian and bisexual organization

Liberdade de Amor entre Mulheres no Ceará (LAMCE; lit. 'Freedom of Love Among Women in Ceará') is a Brazilian activist group for the rights of lesbian and bisexual women.

According to the group, its objective is "To fight against the spread of prejudice based on sexual orientation, through affirmative political actions aimed at the visibility, guarantee and realization of the human rights and citizenship of lesbian and bisexual women." The group was founded in 2003, formed mainly by lesbian women who were active in the Workers' Party.

Currently, the group is based at Grupo de Resistencia Asa Branca (GRAB), participates in the political council of Forum Cearense de Mulheres (FCM), which is linked to Associação de Mulheres Brasileiras (AMB), and is affiliated with Liga Brasileira de Lésbicas (LBL), Associação Brasileira de Lésbicas (ABL), and Associação Brasileira de Gays, Lésbicas e Transgenêros (ABGLT).
