= Gender fluidity =

Non-fixed gender identity

Genderfluid
- The genderfluid pride flag
- Classification: Gender identity
- Abbreviations: GF
- Parent category: Non-binary
- Symbol: or

Gender fluidity (commonly referred to as genderfluid) is a non-fixed gender identity that shifts over time or depending on the situation. These fluctuations can occur at the level of gender identity or gender expression. A genderfluid person may fluctuate among different gender expressions over their lifetime, or express multiple aspects of various gender markers simultaneously. Genderfluid individuals may identify as non-binary, transgender, or cisgender (meaning they identify with the gender associated with their sex assigned at birth).

In gender fluidity, a shift in gender identity refers to changes in one's internal sense of their gender, which may differ from their assigned sex at birth or their external appearance. Fluctuations in gender expression refer to outward changes in appearance and presentation, such as clothing, behavior, hairstyle, voice, pronoun use (etc). A genderfluid person may experience changes in identity, expression, or both.

Gender fluidity is a form of gender nonconformity, which describes aspects of gender identity, gender expression, and social roles that challenge traditional notions and models of gender identity. A 2019 peer-review in American Psychologist suggests that genderfluid identities challenge the traditional models which represent gender as a fixed, binary construct.

Gender fluidity is different from gender-questioning (not to be confused with queer) a process in which people explore their gender in order to find their true gender identity and adjust their gender expression accordingly. Gender fluidity continues throughout the lives of genderfluid people. Someone who identifies as genderfluid can use any pronouns they choose.

Research on genderfluid youth emphasizes that childhood and adolescence signify important developmental periods when individuals become more aware of gender categories and social expectations. Genderfluid youth face distinct challenges because of their non-fixed gender identities and expressions, which may often be misinterpreted and challenged by adults, peers, or institutions as gender uncertainty rather than as a valid form of gender identity. These challenges can be particularly relevant in academic, healthcare and familial settings where forms, policies, dress codes, pronouns, and interactions with peers often assume the traditional binary model of gender identity. Researchers argue that genderfluid and nonbinary youth should be taken into consideration in developmental research of gender identity, rather than being treated as exceptions to typical gender development.

== History ==
Documented instances of transgender people (including non-binary and third gender people) who diverge from cisgender norms have been recorded in cultures worldwide dating back to at least the pre-colonial era. One example is the existence of gender fluidity in many Indigenous communities. Although the earliest records of gender fluidity in Indigenous communities was written by those who colonized them, current research shows that over 150 pre-colonial groups are known to recognize or have historically recognized more than two genders.

The Navajo people are one group who historically recognized between four and five gender identities, one of them being nádleehi ('changing one' in English). In more recent history, two-spirit has been an identity adopted by Indigenous gender and sexual minorities. The term challenges binary categories of sex and gender and enables some Indigenous people to reclaim traditional roles within their societies. According to the 2012 Risk and Resilience study of Bisexual Mental Health, "the most common identities reported by transgender Aboriginal participants were two-spirit, genderqueer, and bigender."

The term Hijras is a historically recognized third gender within South Asian countries: Bangladesh, India, Nepal, and Pakistan. The term Hijras can date back to holy Hindu texts such as the Ramayana and the Mahabharata, where a Hindu character named Arjuna transforms into the third gender. In South Asia, many Muslim rulers from the 15th to 19th century Mughal Empire were patrons of third-gender Indians. Hijras are often assigned male at birth, and adopt feminine characters, like clothing, grooming, and even use feminine names.

Another example of historical recognition of gender fluidity is the Philippines. In the Philippines, they use the umbrella term baklâ to refer to "those born male who currently exist with a feminine gender expression." Although this definition of the term is most common, there are a variety of identities that exist within the baklâ umbrella.

Fa'afāfine are a culturally recognized gender category in Sāmoa used to describe individuals assigned male at birth who assume a third gender or take on feminine gender roles and expressions. Scholars caution that the term fa'afāfine should be differentiated from Western labels of transgender, nonbinary, or genderfluid, largely because this identity is shaped by Sāmoan social and cultural roles.

=== Impact of colonization ===
European colonization strictly enforced the binary gender concept onto many groups, including those mentioned above. In the 1500s, Europeans landed in North America and enforced binary gender conformity onto the Indigenous communities occupying the land. They criminalized different gender and sexual expressions. It is believed that they did this in an attempt to "eradicate the two-spirit identity before allowing it to be documented." As a result of this, the cultural legacy of many Indigenous groups was nearly erased following colonization. Going back to the Philippines example, enforcement of a binary gender concept began with the arrival of the Spanish in 1520. The Spanish began to use the word baklâ as a slur to pressure Filipino people into adopting European ideals of gender expression. British colonial rule also affected Hijra communities in South Asia. Under the Criminal Tribes Act enacted in 1871, British authorities classified Hijras as a criminalized group and subjected them to surveillance and legal prosecution. As a result, the vast majority of Hijras faced discrimination, harassment, and social stigma during British colonial rule, with many of these stigmas persisting into modern-day India. By forcing colonized groups to adopt European ideals of gender expression and identity, it erased key aspects of each group's history, culture, and traditions.

=== The modern era ===
Non-binary and genderfluid flags photographed at 2026 Curitiba Pride, in International LGBTQ Pride Day

The modern terms and meanings of "transgender", "gender", "gender identity", and "gender role" only emerged in the 1950s and 1960s. As a result, opinions vary on how to accurately categorize historical accounts of gender-variant people and identities, including genderfluid individuals.

The 1928 Virginia Woolf novel Orlando: A Biography features a main character who changes gender several times, and considers gender fluidity:

In every human being, a vacillation from one sex to the other takes place, and often it is only the clothes that keep the male or female likeness, while underneath the sex is the very opposite of what it is above.

The first known mention of the term gender fluidity was in Kate Bornstein's 1994 gender studies book Gender Outlaw: On Men, Women and the Rest of Us. It was later used again in the 1996 book The Second Coming: A Leatherdyke Reader.

=== Health care recognition ===
In health care, genderfluid identities are often discussed within a broader category of transgender and gender-diverse individuals. The World Professional Association for Transgender Health (WPATH) notes that "TGD people encompass a diverse array of gender identities and expressions," reflecting clinical recognition of gender diversity, including gender identities and expressions that do not fit within fixed binary categories.

== Symbols ==
The genderfluid pride flag was designed by Jamie Poole in 2012. The pink stripe of the flag represents femininity, the white represents lack of gender, purple represents androgyny, black represents all other genders outside or beyond the typical gender spectrum , and blue represents masculinity.

The flag is a representation of the fluidity encompassed within the identity.

== See also ==
- Gender identity
- Gender questioning
- Non-binary gender
- Transgender
