= Janine Mello =

Brazilian politician

Minister of Human Rights and Citizenship
- Incumbent
- Assumed office 1 April 2026
- President: Luiz Inácio Lula da Silva
- Preceded by: Macaé Evaristo

Personal details
- Party: Independent

Janine Mello dos Santos is a Brazilian politician serving as minister of human rights and citizenship since 2026. From 2024 to 2026, she served as executive secretary of the Ministry of Human Rights and Citizenship.
