= Cristiane Britto =

Brazilian lawyer and politician

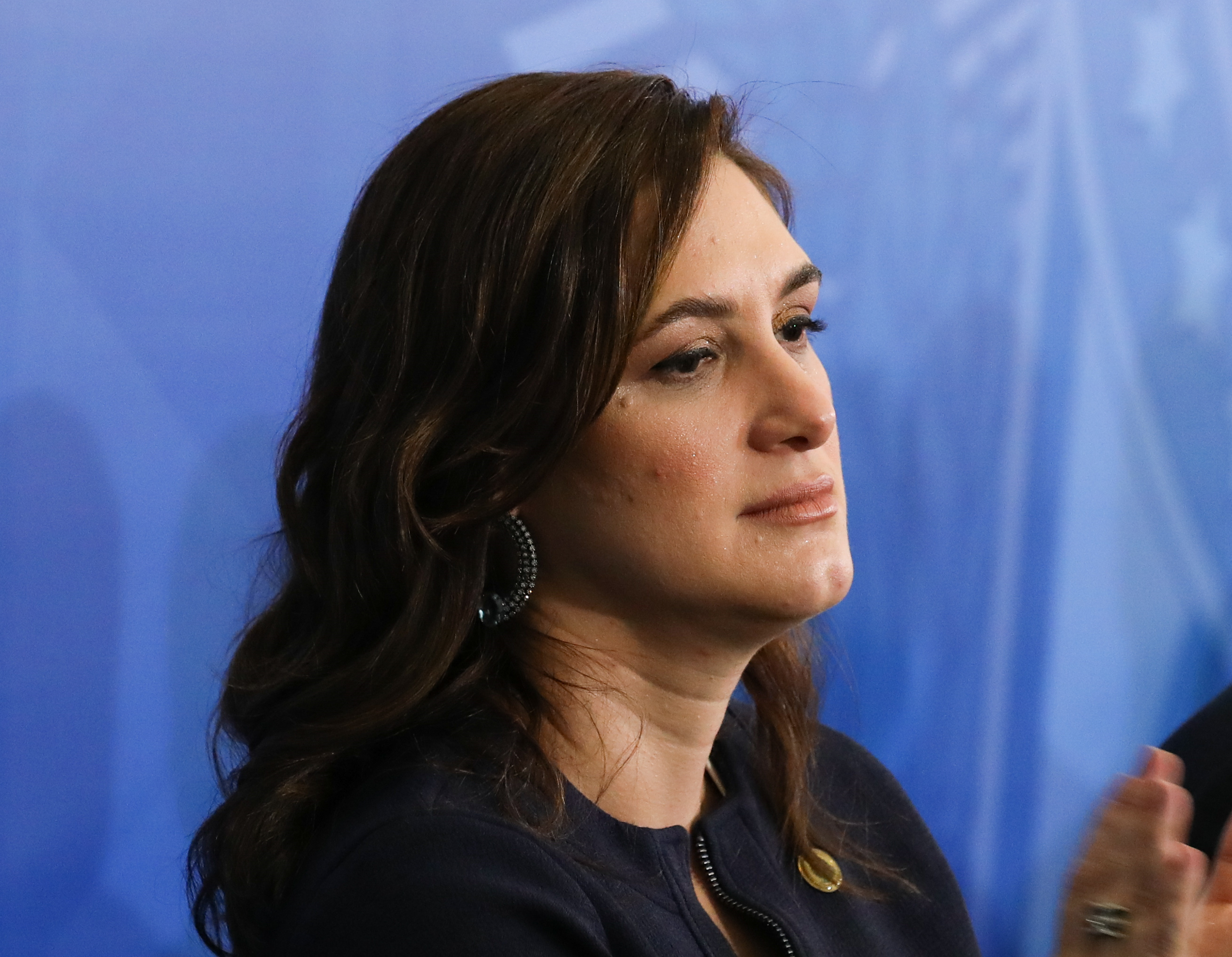

Minister of Women, Family and Human Rights
- In office 30 March 2022 – 1 January 2023
- President: Jair Bolsonaro
- Preceded by: Damares Alves
- Succeeded by: Silvio Almeida

Personal details
- Born: Cristiane Rodrigues Britto; 25 January 1979 (age 47) Salvador, Bahia, Brazil
- Party: Republicanos
- Spouse: Flávio Eduardo Wanderley
- Education: Gama Filho University (LL.B.)
- Profession: Lawyer

Cristiane Rodrigues Britto (born 25 January 1979) is a Brazilian lawyer and politician. She had served as Minister of Women, Family and Human Rights.

== Biography ==
Children of entrepreneurs Romualdo Raimundo Rodrigues and Zilmar de Olivera Rodrigues, Britto is Bachelor of Laws from Gama Filho University, with specialization in election law from Southern Santa Catarina University (UNISUL).

She is married to lawyer Flávio Eduardo Wanderley Britto, substitute electoral desembargador of the Federal District Regional Electoral Court (TRE-DF) from 2017 to 2019. She works as an election lawyer in the Federal District since 2003, associated to the Brazilian Academy of Election and Political Law (ABRADEP).

She was member and had served as vice-chair of the Election Law Commission of the Federal District Sectional of the Order of Attorneys of Brazil (PAB-DF) at the time her husband was substitute electoral desembargador.

== Political life ==
Member of the legal body of the political party Republicanos, in May 2019, Britto was nominated to head the National Secretariat for Women's Politics (SNPM), being part of the Damares Alves administration team in the Ministry of Woman, Family and Human Rights.

In March 2022, with the leaving of Alves, she took office as Minister of Woman, Family and Human Rights of Jair Bolsonaro government.

Political offices
| Preceded by Damares Alves | Minister of Woman, Family and Human Rights; 2022−2023 | Succeeded by Silvio Almeida as Minister of Human Rights and Citizenship |
| Preceded by Damares Alves | Minister of Woman, Family and Human Rights; 2022−2023 | Succeeded by Cida Gonçalves as Minister of Women |
