= Secretary of State for Human Rights =

Secretary of State for Human Rights could mean:

- Secretário Especial dos Direitos Humanos, in Brazil
- Secrétaire d'État chargé des Droits de l'Homme, in France
