= Associação Nacional de Travestis e Transexuais =

Brazilian organization

National Association of Travestis and Transsexuals
- Associação Nacional de Travestis e Transexuais
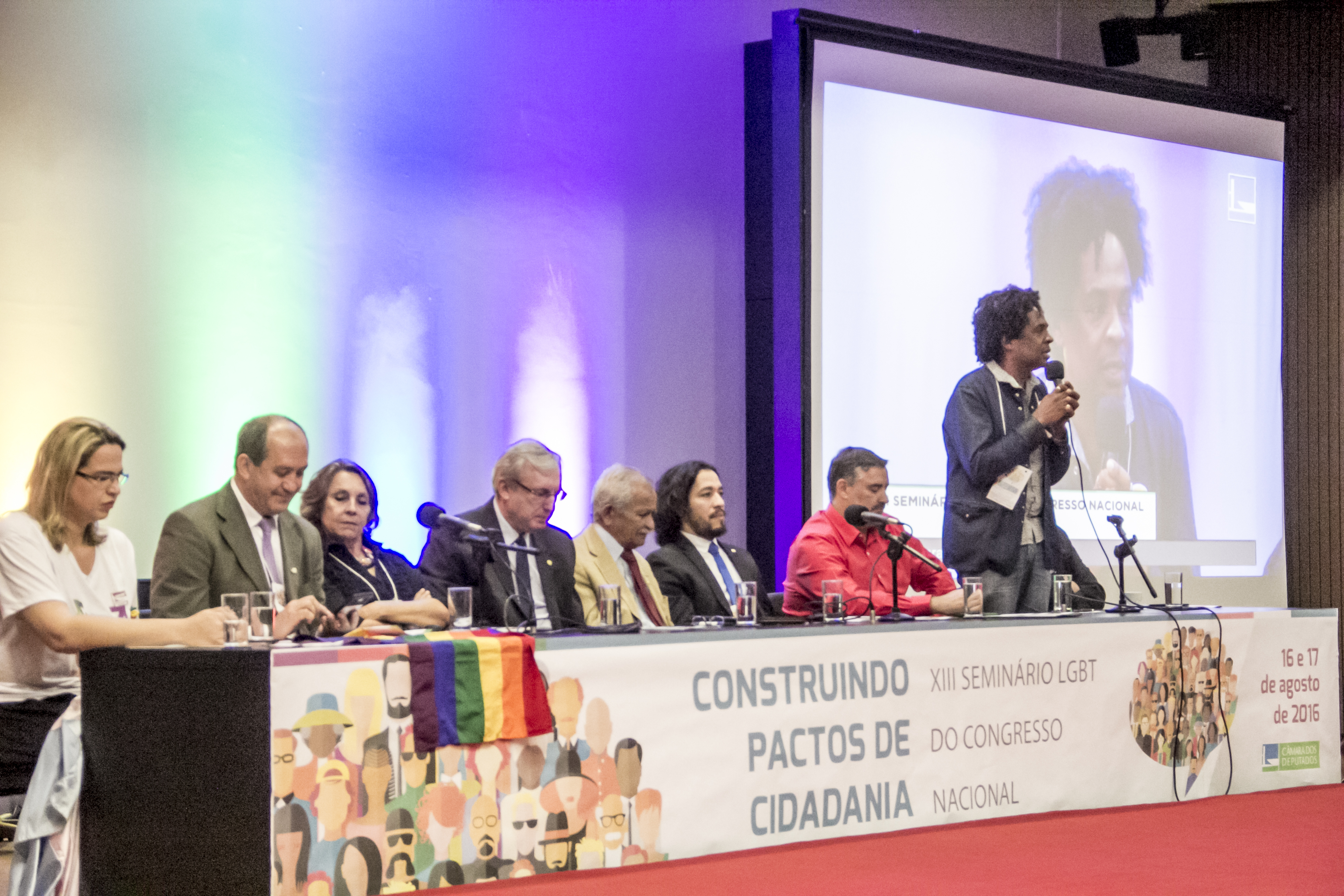
- 2016 LGBT Seminar, in Brasília
- Founder: Jovanna Baby, Keila Simpson
- Official language: Portuguese
- Website: https://antrabrasil.org/

The National Association of Travestis and Transsexuals (Associação Nacional de Travestis e Transexuais or Antra) is a Brazilian institution dedicated to meeting the needs of the travesti and transsexual population, as well as combating transphobia. It was formerly called the National Network of Travestis (Brazilian Portuguese: Rede Nacional de Travestis; Renata), before that called Association of Travestis and Liberated People (Brazilian Portuguese: Associação de Travestis e Liberados; ASTRAL).

The institution's board of directors is renewed every four years. The hierarchical organizational structure consists of a president and vice-president and, immediately below them, a first secretary, second secretary, treasurer, second treasurer, secretary for transgender women, secretary for transgender men, secretary for human rights, secretary for political articulation, secretary for communication, and fiscal advisors.

The organization positions itself as left-wing, trans-feminist, and intersectional.

== History ==
Antra was conceived and articulated in 1992 by Jovanna Baby, and later founded in the city of Porto Alegre, Rio Grande do Sul, by Keila Simpson. In December 2000, it was registered in a notary's office in the city of Curitiba, Paraná. The acronym "Antra" came into effect in 2002, with the expansion of its responsibilities and greater national scope.

In 2008, it was decided to streamline the administration by eliminating the regional representations of the organization, and instead creating the Secretariat of Communication, Political Coordination, Human Rights, and Transgender Men and Women. In 2018, Antra launched the first edition of the Dossier on Murders and Violence Against Transgender People in Brazil (Portuguese: Dossiê dos Assassinatos e Violência de Pessoas Trans no Brasil).

In 2013, the organization had one hundred and five affiliates covering the entire Brazil.

== See also ==
- Associação Brasileira de Lésbicas, Gays, Bissexuais, Travestis, Transexuais e Intersexos
