= Ministry of Women (Brazil) =

- Portuguese: Ministério das Mulheres
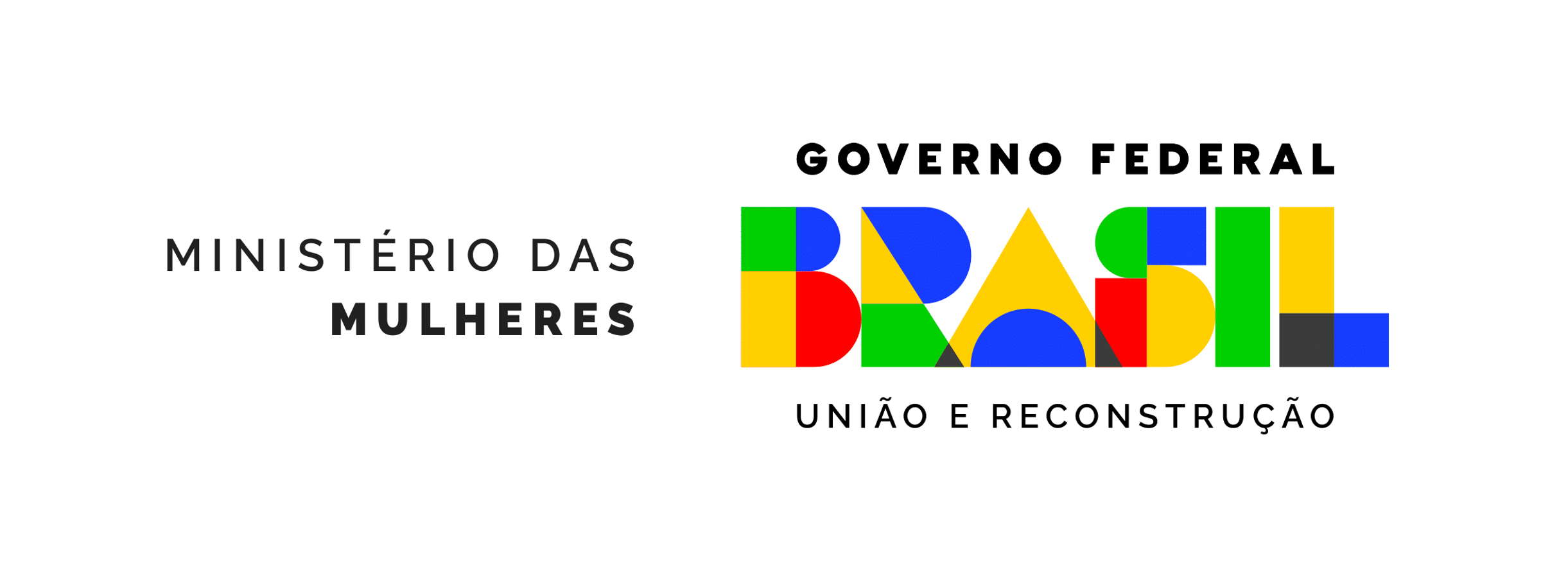

Agency overview
- Formed: 1 January 2003; 23 years ago
- Type: Ministry
- Jurisdiction: Federal government of Brazil
- Headquarters: Esplanada dos Ministérios, Bloco L Brasília, Federal District
- Annual budget: $117 m BRL (2023)
- Agency executives: Márcia Lopes, Minister; Eutália Rodrigues Naves, Executive-Secretary; Sandra Kennedy Viana, Secretary of Institutional Affairs, Thematic Actions and Political Participation; Estelizabel Bezerra de Souza, Secretary of Fight Against Violence Against Women; Joana Célia dos Passos, Secretary of Economic Autonomy and Aid Policies
- Website: www.gov.br/mulheres/

The Brazilian Ministry of Women (Portuguese: Ministério das Mulheres) was established under the Luiz Inácio Lula da Silva administration in 2023 to focus more attention on the politics of women and the growing societal mobilization around issues of gender equality. The Ministry has provided Brazilian citizens with a variety of services and public policies aimed at promoting gender equality, parity, and justice. These have taken a variety of forms, including movements towards women's economic autonomy and care, strengthening protection networks, and most prevalently, combating gender based violence. Since implementing the Beijing Declaration in September 1995, the 2023 reestablishment of the Ministry of Women has focused on institutionalization of collective action, including a widespread variety of programs and policies, and budget restructuring within them. Brazil's Ministry of Women is devoted to the empowerment of gender equality, as well as combating all forms of inequality and violence systemically directed at women.

== History ==
In 2003, under the first Lula da Silva administration, the National Secretariat of Politics for Women was established as a child agency to the Presidency of the Republic, with Nicéa Freire as chief minister. With principal advisors to the President, the secretariat for women started the 180 Hotline in 2005, and sanctioned the Maria de Penha Law on August 7, 2006. The Ministry held a fundamental role in the most recent federal strategy, The National Pact Against Femicide. Aiming to protect vulnerable women to risk of gender based violence, the Ministry worked alongside the First Lady to unite all three branches of government. The National Pact Against Femicide maintains goals of "promoting equal treatment between men and women, combating structural sexism, and incorporating responses to new challenges, such as digital violence against women". This is displayed in its focus on marginalized communities who are at higher risk of gendered violence, including indigenous, black, and rural women.

Sparking the beginning of various services provided by the Ministry, the National Secretariat of Politics for Women initially aimed to elevate Brazilian women's status by implementing and integrating public policies in an attempt to reduce gender inequalities within the nation. When promoted to cabinet level in 2010, the department began acting in three fronts: Policies of Labour and Economic Autonomy of Women, Fight against Violence against Women, and programs and acts in the areas of health, education, culture, political participation, gender equality, and diversity.

In 2019, the Secretariat merged with the Ministry of Human Rights, forming the Ministry of Woman, Family and Human Rights (MMFDH). This merger brought complications regarding the institutionalization of social justice, introducing a variation of goals and ideological redirection. The Ministry's focus on conservative family values had repercussions against the progression of women's rights, often leaving women vulnerable and unprotected in situations such as hunger, domestic violence, and the loss of income and rights. This era of bureaucratic involvement has often been referred to as the 'dismantling of women's rights', with institutional impairments for women such as eliminating the intersectional strategy, minimizing spaces for discourse and democratic participation, and the limiting and controlling the progression of gender concepts and definitions. With a focus on more conservative ideas of family and gender roles, the MMFDH's calculated budget cuts highlighted the lack of care towards women's rights or human rights, and instead intended to distract from the government's underlying economic agenda. Analysis has provided scholars with evidence to claim that the MMFDH has enacted efforts and policies to uphold and strengthen patriarchal family structures while simultaneously combating feminist and LGBTQ movements.

With the end of Jair Bolsonaro's presidency and the election of Lula da Silva, the MMFDH was dismantled, replaced by the active Ministry of Women in 2023.

== Structure ==
Broken into three Secretariats and a Council for Women's Rights, the Ministry of Women is able to organize and arrange its focus among a variety of issues that Brazil face.

=== National Secretariat for Institutional Articulation, Thematic Actions, and Political Participation ===
Considering intersectional backgrounds and diversity of identities, the National Secretariat (Portuguese: Secretaria Nacional de Articulação Institucional, Ações Temáticas e Participação Política) organizes the creation and implementation of policies for women, with a focus on education, culture, health, and political participation.

=== National Secretariat for Confronting Violence against Women ===
The Secretariat (Portuguese: Secretaria Nacional de Enfrentamento à Violência contra as Mulheres) focuses on prevention and penalization of domestic and sexual violence, coordinating specialized, multifaceted care networks throughout the country that work to address Brazil's compounding issue of violence against women.

=== Secretariat for Autonomy, Economy, and Care Policy ===
Responsible for creating, distributing, and analyzing cross-sectional studies, projects, and research, the Secretariat for Autonomy, Economy, and Care Policy (Portuguese: Secretaria de Autonomia, Ecônomia e Política de Cuidados) provides national policies that aim to reduce women's workload and sacrifice.

=== National Council for Women's Rights ===
Established in 1985, the council (Portuguese: Conselho Nacional pelos Direitos das Mulheres) "aims to promote national policies directed to women using a gender perspective... to eliminate prejudice and discrimination, including in economic and financial affairs, and extend the process of social control over such policies".

== Services ==
=== Dial 180 Hotline (Ligue 180) ===
Launched in 2005, Dial 180 is a free phone service that gives women the option to report instances of gender based violence. In attempt to minimize and eventually prevent the prevalent issue of violence against women, Dial 180 provides information on women's rights, and has services and sources to refer women to for support and assistance. Restructured with the Ministry in 2023, the service has worked to increase accessibility, implementing discreet services within WhatsApp, improving its referral network into a single database, and specializing assistance to a more humanized experience, Since its refurbishment, Dial 180 has increased its outreach up 23% between 2022 and 2023, averaging 1,558 calls per day.

=== Brazilian Woman's House Program (Casa da Mulher Brasileira) ===
In 2015, the federal government and the secretariat organized and coordinated the Brazilian Woman's House (Portuguese: Casa da Mulher Brasileira)--a part of the program "Woman, Live without Violence". The program aims to facilitate the access to public services that guarantee the fight against domestic violence and aid women's economic autonomy. The program grants victims of domestic violence centralized and humanized care in the forms of immediate protection, psychosocial support, specialized police and legal aid, economic autonomy programs, and temporary accommodation. These resources and active combative tactics working to reduce violence and foster economic independence among Brazilian women.

=== Maria da Penha Law (Lei Maria da Penha) ===
On August 7, 2006, the Brazilian government adopted the Maria da Penha Law to protect women from cases of domestic and family violence. The Ministry of Women assisted in drafting, promoting, and enforcing the law, as an act towards the illegalization of violence against women. Amended in 2018 with legislative acts, the law now requires aggressors to reimburse the Unified Health System for any expenses caused by their violence, including safety devices that help monitor the victims. This law was sparked by the violence enacted against Maria da Penha by her husband, leaving her paraplegic for life. With this law, it "establishes special courts and stricter sentences for offenders, but also other instruments for the prevention and relief in cities of more than 60,000 inhabitants, such as police stations and shelters for women." With the establishment of this law, Brazil has seen stricter punishments for aggressors, more intent care and quicker action regarding legal procedures, and specialized support services for victims.

=== Empowerment Programs ===
==== Thousand Women (Mulheres Mil) ====
Established by the Ministry of Education in 2011, Thousand Women (Portuguese: Mulheres Mil) provides female domestic workers with Federal Institute training courses to ensure professional qualification and citizenship training to increase education and promote productive placement and mobility within the workplace. Mulheres Mil provides vulnerable women with courses on labor and social rights, gender and race inequalities, care economy, digital inclusion, and content recomposition.

==== Productive Backyards (Quintas Productivos) ====
Established on August 16, 2023, in response to the female mobilization Marcha das Magaridas, Productive Backyards (Portuguese: Quintas Produtivos) was created and managed by women seeking food production in rural Brazilian areas. Assisting rural women's agricultural production, the program provides funding, technical assistance, cisterns and commercialization to rural communities and food deserts throughout the nation. The program aims to "promote the economic autonomy of rural women and expand access to public policies that support the production and commercialization of food and to social technologies for access to drinking water..."

==== Reference Centers (Centros de Referência) ====
Located in 11 states, reference centers (Portuguese: Centros de Referência) throughout Brazil assist women in situations of sexual, physical, and psychological violence, whether repeated or sporadic. The centers offer women guidance regarding rights and promotion of citizenship, working via global action and interdisciplinary care, in efforts to provide women with foundational knowledge and active steps to protect against scenarios of gender based violence.

== List of ministers ==
| No. | Portrait | Minister | Took office | Left office | Time in office | Party | President |
|---|---|---|---|---|---|---|---|
| 1 | Emília Fernandes | Emília Fernandes (born 1950) | 1 January 2003 | 29 January 2004 | 1 year, 28 days | PT | Luiz Inácio Lula da Silva (PT) |
| 2 | Nilcea Freire | Nilcea Freire (1953–2019) | 27 January 2004 | 1 January 2011 | 6 years, 339 days | PT | Luiz Inácio Lula da Silva (PT) |
| 3 | Iriny Lopes | Iriny Lopes (born 1956) | 1 January 2011 | 10 February 2012 | 1 year, 40 days | PT | Dilma Rousseff (PT) |
| 4 | Eleonora Menicucci | Eleonora Menicucci (born 1944) | 10 February 2012 | 2 October 2015 | 3 years, 234 days | PT | Dilma Rousseff (PT) |
| 5 | Cida Gonçalves | Cida Gonçalves (born 1962) | 1 January 2023 | 5 May 2025 | 2 years, 124 days | PT | Luiz Inácio Lula da Silva (PT) |
| 6 | Márcia Lopes | Márcia Lopes (born 1957) | 5 May 2025 | Incumbent | 1 year, 132 days | PT | Luiz Inácio Lula da Silva (PT) |
