= Eleonora Menicucci =

Brazilian feminist and sociologist (born 1944)

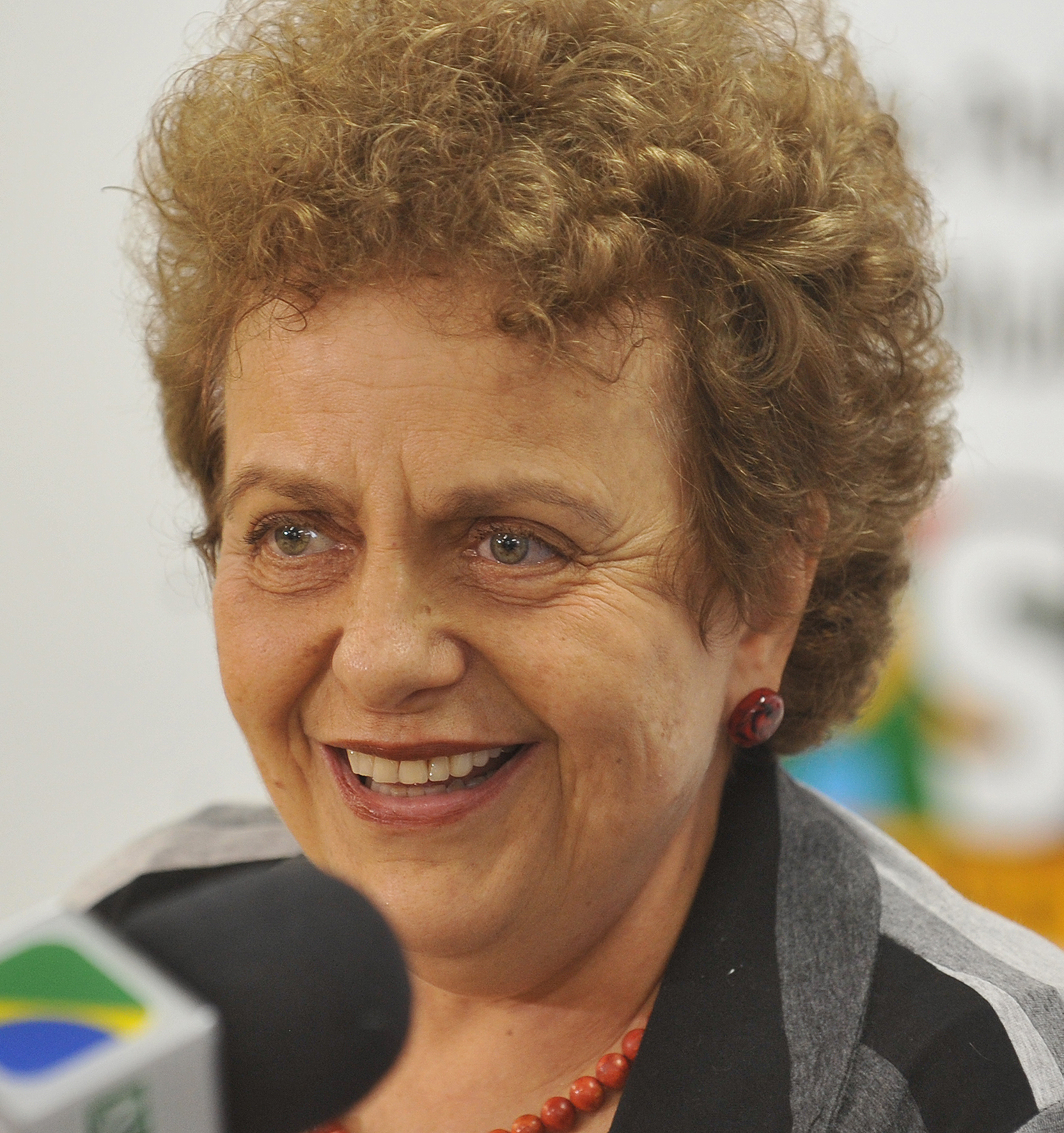

Secretary of Politics for Women
- In office 10 February 2012 – 2 October 2015
- President: Dilma Rousseff
- Preceded by: Iriny Lopes

Personal details
- Born: Eleonora Menicucci de Oliveira; 21 August 1944 (age 82) Lavras, Minas Gerais, Brazil
- Party: PT (1980–present)
- Education: Federal University of Minas Gerais (B.Soc.Sc); Federal University of Paraíba (M.Soc.); University of São Paulo (Ph.D.)
- Profession: University professor, sociologist

Eleonora Menicucci de Oliveira (born 21 August 1944) is a Brazilian sociologist and was Minister of the Secretariat of Policies for Women until Dilma Rousseff's Impeachment in 2016. She is a full professor in public health at Federal University of São Paulo. A member of the Workers' Party, and dedicated to feminism, she is favorable to the legalization of abortion in Brazil. Menicucci has a degree in Social Sciences from the Universidade Federal de Minas Gerais (1974), MA in sociology from the Federal University of Paraíba (1983), Ph.D. in political science from the University of São Paulo (1990), post-doctorate in Health and Work of Women from University of Milan (1994/1995) and a teaching degree in Public Health from the School of Public Health, University of São Paulo (1996). She publishes research studies and articles on critical issues related to women in the fields of health, violence and labor. She is divorced and has two children.

== Biography ==
A political activist opposed to the military regime in Brazil, she participated in the armed struggle and gave birth to a daughter while underground. When she was arrested in 1971, her daughter, then 1 year and 10 months old, was taken with her. She was in Tiradentes Prision with fellow activist Dilma Rousseff, who was her neighbor and college classmate in Belo Horizonte. Like Dilma, Eleonora was also tortured while imprisoned.

In an interview with TPM magazine in August 2007, she declared herself bisexual, stating, "I have relationships with men and women and I am very proud of my daughter, who is gay and had a daughter through artificial insemination."

On 10 February 2012, she was chosen by the President of the Republic, Dilma Rousseff, to head the Special Secretariat for Policies for Women, replacing Iriny Lopes.

For openly defending the legalization of abortion and LGBTQ rights, Menicucci received criticism, including from government supporters, such as the former president of the Chamber of Deputies, Marco Maia (PT). Then-federal deputy Eduardo Cunha (PMDB-RJ) described the minister's appointment as a disaster for the government's image.

On 2 October 2015, President Dilma's ministerial and administrative reform merged the Secretariat for Policies to Promote Racial Equality, the Secretariat for Human Rights, and the Secretariat for Policies for Women, creating the Ministry of Women, Racial Equality, and Human Rights. As a result, Eleonora assumed the position of executive secretary.

== Partial works ==
- (1999) A mulher, a sexualidade e o trabalho

Political offices
Preceded by Iriny Lopes	Secretary of Politics for Women; 2012–15	Office abolished
