= Luislinda Valois =

Brazilian jurist, magistrate and politician

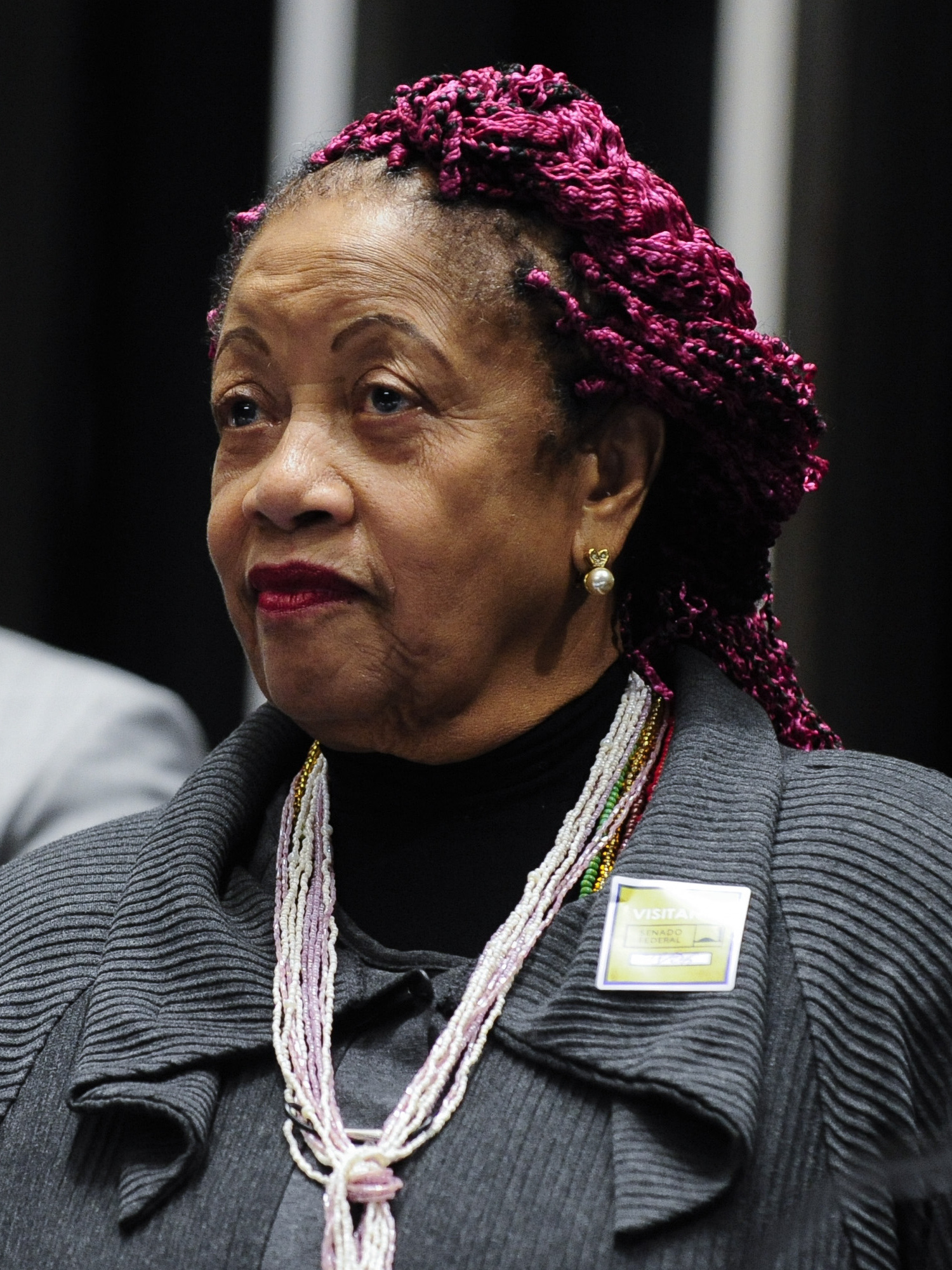

Minister of Human Rights
- In office 3 February 2017 – 19 February 2018
- President: Michel Temer
- Preceded by: Nilma Lino Gomes
- Succeeded by: Gustavo do Vale Rocha

Secretary of Promotion of Racial Equality
- In office 13 June 2016 – 3 February 2017
- Minister: Alexandre de Moraes

Personal details
- Born: Luislinda Dias de Valois Santos; 20 January 1942 (age 84) Salvador, BA, Brazil
- Party: Independent (2017–present)
- Other political affiliations: PSDB (2013–2017)
- Education: Catholic University of Salvador (UCSAL)
- Occupation: Jurist

Luislinda Dias de Valois Santos (born 20 January 1942 in Salvador) is a Brazilian jurist, magistrate and politician. Former member of the Brazilian Social Democracy Party (PSDB), was minister of Human Rights. She was the third black judge to be appointed in her home-state (Bahia), was desembargadora of the Court of Justice of the State of Bahia (TJ-BA). She left the office of Minister on 19 February 2018.

Political offices
Preceded by Nilma Lino Gomes	Minister of Human Rights; 2017–2018	Succeeded by Gustavo do Vale Rocha
