= Macaé Evaristo =

Brazilian social worker (born 1965)

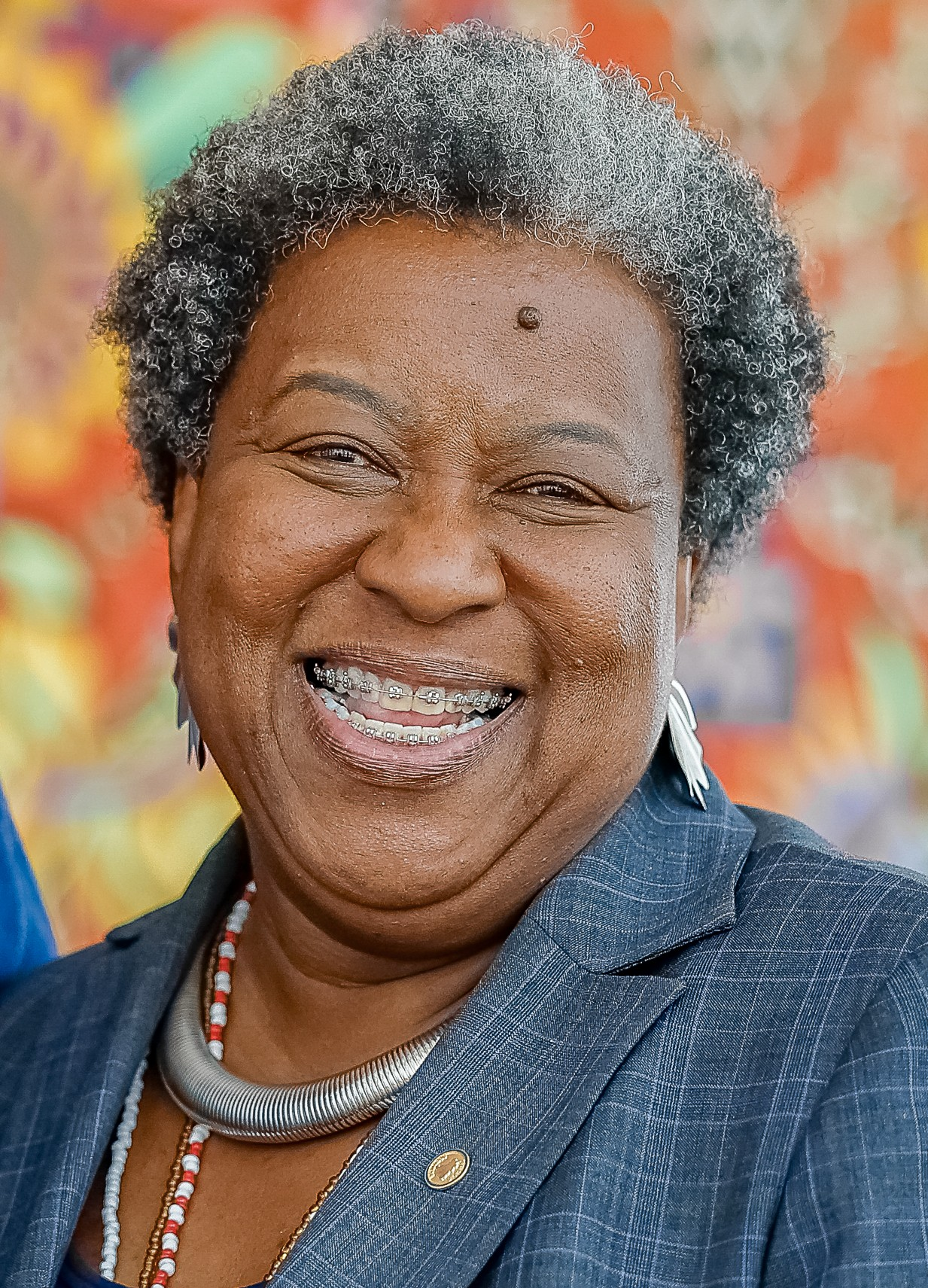

Minister of Humans Rights and Citizenship
- In office 9 September 2024 – 31 March 2026
- President: Luiz Inácio Lula da Silva
- Preceded by: Esther Dweck (interim)
- Succeeded by: Janine Mello

State Deputy of Minas Gerais
- Incumbent
- Assumed office 1 February 2023
- Constituency: At-large

Councilor of Belo Horizonte
- In office 1 January 2021 – 31 January 2023
- Constituency: At-large

Secretary of Education of Minas Gerais
- In office 1 January 2015 – 31 January 2018

Secretary of Education of Belo Horizonte
- In office 2005–2012

Personal details
- Born: April 3, 1965 (age 61) São Gonçalo do Pará, Minas Gerais, Brazil
- Party: PT
- Relatives: Conceição Evaristo (cousin)
- Education: Pontifical Catholic University of Minas Gerais; Federal University of Minas Gerais
- Occupation: Teacher; social worker; politician

Macaé Maria Evaristo dos Santos (born 3 April 1965) is a Brazilian teacher, social worker and politician, affiliated with the Workers' Party and current Minister of Human Rights and Citizenship of Brazil. She is a state deputy of Minas Gerais, and is currently licensed.

She has a degree in Social Work from the Pontifical Catholic University of Minas Gerais (PUC Minas) and a master's degree in education from the Federal University of Minas Gerais (UFMG). She has been a teacher in the Belo Horizonte municipal school system since the age of 19 and was the first black woman to hold the positions of Municipal Secretary of Education of Belo Horizonte, from 2005 to 2012, and State Secretary of Education of Minas Gerais, from 2015 to 2018. She was also head of the Ministry of Education's Secretariat for Continuing Education, Literacy, Diversity and Inclusion, from 2013 to 2014, under the Dilma Rousseff government.

In the 2020 elections, she was elected to the Belo Horizonte City Council by the Workers' Party with 5,985 votes. In 2022, she was elected to the Legislative Assembly of Minas Gerais with 50,416 votes. She was part of the Lula government's transition team, in the education working group, working in the areas of diversity and inclusion.

Her cousin is the writer Conceição Evaristo. On 15 September 2020, the analytical biography Macaé Evaristo – Uma Força Negra Na Cena Pública, by the authors Jailson de Souza e Silva and Eliana Sousa e Silva was published by Eduniperiferias.

Political offices
Preceded by Esther Dweck (interim)	Minister of Human Rights and Citizenship; 2024–2026	Succeeded by Janine Mello
