= Damares Alves =

Brazilian attorney and evangelical pastor (born 1964)

- Official portrait

Senator for the Federal District
- Incumbent
- Assumed office 1 February 2023
- Preceded by: José Reguffe

Minister of Women, Families and Human Rights
- In office 1 January 2019 – 31 March 2022
- President: Jair Bolsonaro
- Preceded by: Gustavo do Vale Rocha
- Succeeded by: Cristiane Britto

Personal details
- Born: Damares Regina Alves; 11 September 1964 (age 62) Paranaguá, Paraná, Brazil
- Party: Republicanos (2022–present)
- Other political affiliations: PP (1995–2020)
- Children: 1
- Profession: Evangelical pastor

Damares Regina Alves (born March 11, 1964) is a Brazilian lawyer, politician, and evangelical pastor.

== Overview ==
Alves was the Minister of Women, Families, and Human Rights during the Presidency of Jair Bolsonaro from 2019 to 2022. She is the second female minister appointed to the new government as of December 2018. In the 2022 election, Damares was elected Senator for the Federal District.

Alves defends the prohibition of abortion after rape and in risk pregnancies, women trafficking, supports legislation forcing schools and hospitals to report attempts at suicide, the prohibition of juvenile self-harming and drug consumption, which she said include taking hormone blockers. She declared that she is engaged directly in the "preparation of youth for the Fourth Industrial Revolution" and intended to consolidate an agenda between different ministries of the Federal Government capable of integrating programs, policies, projects and initiatives under the same, articulated perspective of impact - modernizing education.

== Biography ==
Born in Paraná in 1964, daughter of northeastern parents, Alves migrated to the northeast with her family. As a child, she lived in Bahia, in Alagoas and Sergipe. She also lived in São Carlos in the São Paulo state. These moves are strictly linked to her father's profession, as he was the pastor Henrique Alves Sobrinho, from the "Quadrangular" Gospel Church - the Foursquare Gospel Church.

She studied pedagogy at the Faculdade Pio X in Aracaju and obtained a Bachelor of Arts in 1986. She then studied law at the Faculdades Integradas de São Carlos and obtained a Bachelor of Arts in 1992.

=== Career ===
In São Carlos, she worked for the Municipal Secretary of Tourism, serving in the old COMTUR (Municipal Commission of Tourism), during the government of the mayor Vadinho de Guzzi. In 1999, shortly before obtaining her registration in the state bar exam, (the OAB-SP), she became junior parliamentarian auxiliary in Brasília.

She was a pastor of Foursquare Gospel Church and also of the Baptist Church of Lagoinha, in Belo Horizonte.

Alves was co-ordinator of the educational project of Proteger Program, organization created by Guilherme Zanina Schelb, regional attorney of the Republic in the Federal District and member of the National Association of Evangelical Jurists (organization of which Alves was Director of Parliamentary Affairs). Schelb was known for defending the project nicknamed "Escola sem Partido" (Nonpartisan School).

In 1999, Alves moved to Brasília to work as a parliamentary assistant in the office of deputy Joshua Bengtson (PTB-PA). She also worked for federal deputy Arolde de Oliveira (PSD), a senator elected by Rio de Janeiro in 2018, and whose success at the polls in October was due, in large part, to the support of the so-called "Bolsonaro clan." She served as a parliamentary auxiliary in Senator Magno Malta's office, prior to the bond with the senator in favor of the Espírito Santo state. He was chief of cabinet of another exponent of the Neopentecostal bench in the Chamber of Deputies, the federal deputy João Campos de Araújo (PRB).

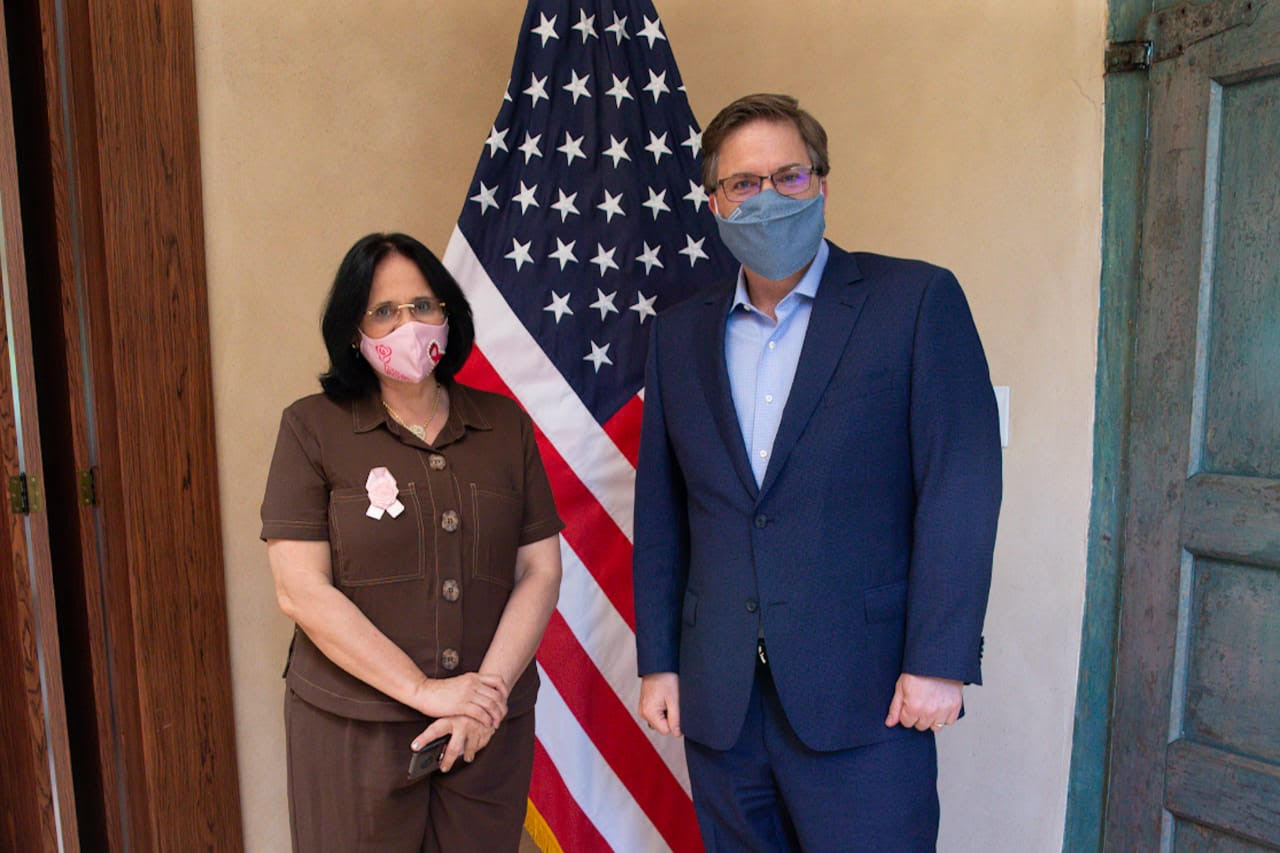
Alves with former US Ambassador to Brazil, Todd Chapman.

She has worked as legal adviser in the National Congress for more than 20 years, before her appointment by Bolsonaro to the Ministry of Women, Families and Human Rights.

== Criticisms ==
From 2013, during a lecture at a church in Mato Grosso do Sul, she presented herself as a lawyer and master in education, constitutional law and family law, although she never received a master's degree and her formal education is limited to a Law degree. On that occasion, she was criticizing a Dutch custom. When confronted about her lack of credentials, she argued saying she was a Christian master (or "teacher," as in most of the versions), as in Ephesians 4:11 "And it is he who gifted some to be apostles, others to be prophets, others to be evangelists, and still others to be pastors and teachers".

=== "Boys wear blue, girls wear pink" ===
Following Jair Bolsonaro's inauguration, a video in which Damares celebrates the victory, proclaiming that the New Era had begun and that from now on boys would wear blue and girls would wear pink, became widely criticized on social media. The video led to the creation of the "Cor não tem gênero" (lit. 'Color has no gender') movement. Later, a secretary from the ministry stated that she had only used a "metaphor to respect what is natural," which generated even more criticism.

== Government Ministry ==
Alves had been a legal adviser in the National Congress for more than 20 years prior to her appointment by Bolsonaro.

As Minister of Women, Families and Human Rights of Brazil, she, at the United Nations 63rd Session of the Commission on the Status of Women in March 2019, affirmed that the combatting violence against women is a definite goal of the government, as well as the growth of girls.

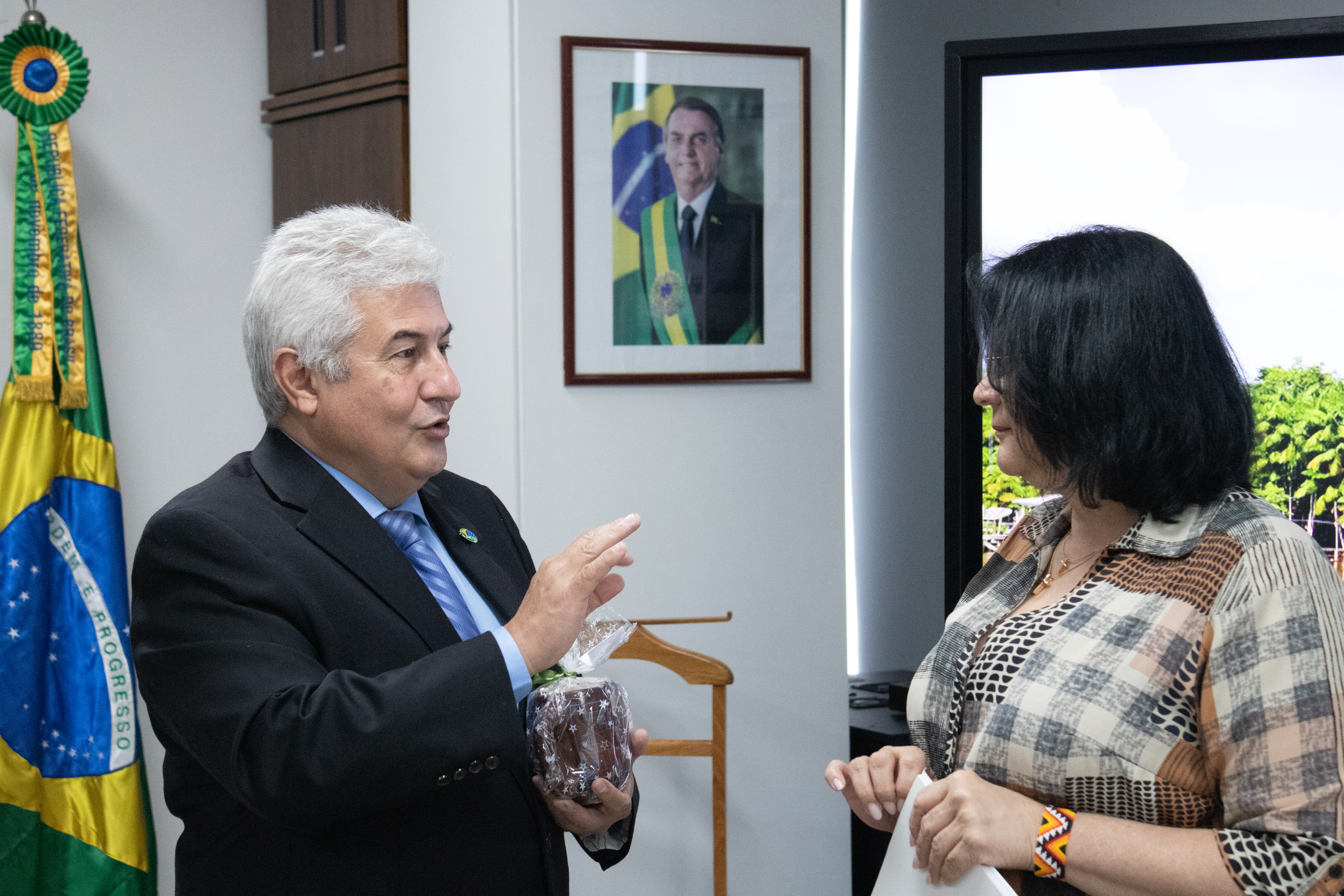
Alves meets with officials

In 2020, she stated that she wishes to see more women in politics and launched a course to encourage women to run for office called Marathon+ Women in Politics. More women stood for election that year, including Maely Benedetti who was elected as a local councillor for Tucumã in the northern state of Pará on a pro-family ticket, and Rita Passos, who was runner-up in the mayoral race in Itu. Both were supported by Alves.

== Personal views and activism ==
In 2022, Alves publicly expressed sympathy for integralism. Deeply religious, she has claimed to have seen a vision of Jesus atop a guava tree, and has stated that "the State is secular, but this minister is extremely Christian, and because of that, she believes in God's design."

Alves has indicated that religious views should take greater prominence in national politics. In 2016 journalists reported that she had addressed worshippers in an Evangelical church telling them, "It is time for the church to tell the nation that we have come ... It is time for the church to govern."

She also disclosed that she is a supporter of "traditional" gender roles within society and an opponent of what she regards as "ideological indoctrination," suggesting that girls should be regarded as "princesses" who wear pink and boys as little "princes" who wear blue. In a viral video, she claimed that Elsa from Disney's Frozen must be a lesbian because the princess ends up alone in a castle of ice. Alves says that "women are made to be mothers.".

She also supports prohibiting abortion in cases of rape or incest (only supporting it on cases where the mother's or baby's life/health is threatened) and harsher punishments on women trafficking and rape. She also previously defended projects to fight juvenile self-harming and suicide as well as juvenile drug consumption (which includes, in her opinion, hormone blockers).

Alves is a vocal critic of the annual carnival festival in Brazil, saying that "carnival parties, unfortunately, are an affront and a disrespect to the Christian faith." Alves promised to pass a bill protecting evangelicals who protest at the carnival.

== Personal life ==
Alves has an adoptive daughter of Kamayurá indigenous origin, born in 1998 in Xingu Indigenous Park. Some journalists of Época Magazine in Brazil went to the tribe, who claim the child was kidnapped from them; they say she was lured to Brasilia by Alves and an associate named Márcia Suzuki, who presented themselves as missionaries, under the pretense of taking her to the city for dental treatment. Alves and her adopted daughter deny it, while Alves claims she saved her from malnutrition and possible infanticide.

Political offices
Preceded by Gustavo do Vale Rocha as Minister of Human Rights	Minister of Women, Families and Human Rights; 2019–2022	Succeeded by Cristiane Britto
