= Nilmário Miranda =

Brazilian politician (born 1947)

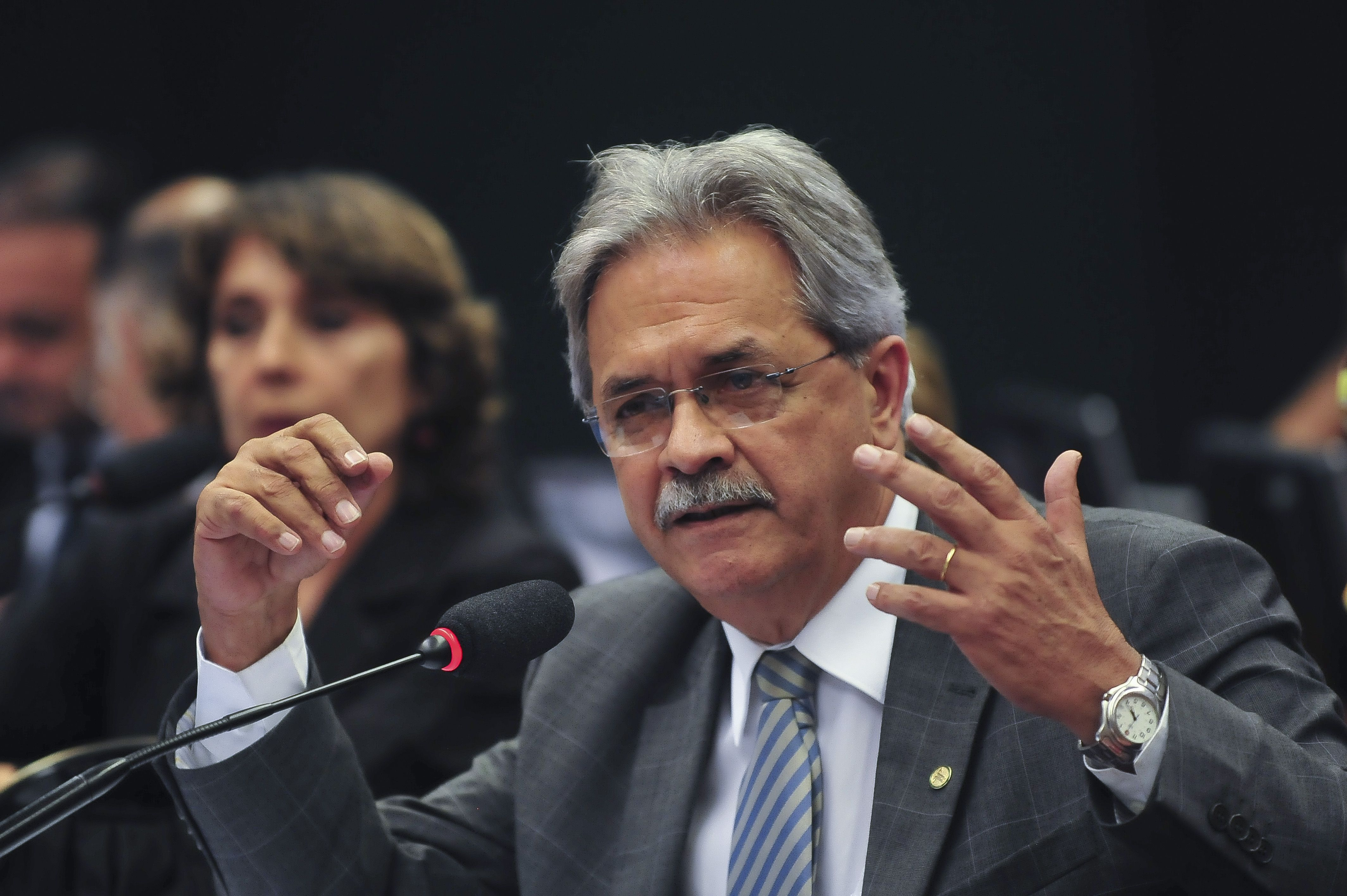
- Nilmário Miranda in 2014

Member of the Chamber of Deputies (Brazil)
- In office 1991–2003

Secretary of Human Rights (Brazil)
- In office January 2003 – July 2005

Member of the Legislative Assembly of Minas Gerais
- In office 1987–1991

Personal details
- Born: August 11, 1947 (age 79) Teófilo Otoni, Minas Gerais, Brazil
- Party: Workers' Party (Brazil)
- Education: Degree in Journalism, Graduate degree in Political Science
- Occupation: Politician

Nilmário Miranda (born 11 August 1947) is a Brazilian politician, affiliated with the Workers' Party.

Miranda was born in Teófilo Otoni, in the state of Minas Gerais. He holds a degree in journalism and a graduate degree in political science. He was imprisoned by the military government for three years and one month in 1972–75.

He served in the Minas Gerais State Congress from 1987 to 1991, and then in the federal Chamber of Deputies from 1991 to 2003, where he chaired the human rights committee. In January 2003, President Luiz Inácio Lula da Silva selected him to head the federal Secretariat for Human Rights, where he served until July 2005.

He ran for the governorship of Minas Gerais in 2002 and 2006, but lost on both occasions to Aécio Neves of the Social Democrats (PSDB).
