= Cida Gonçalves =

Brazilian politician (born 1962)

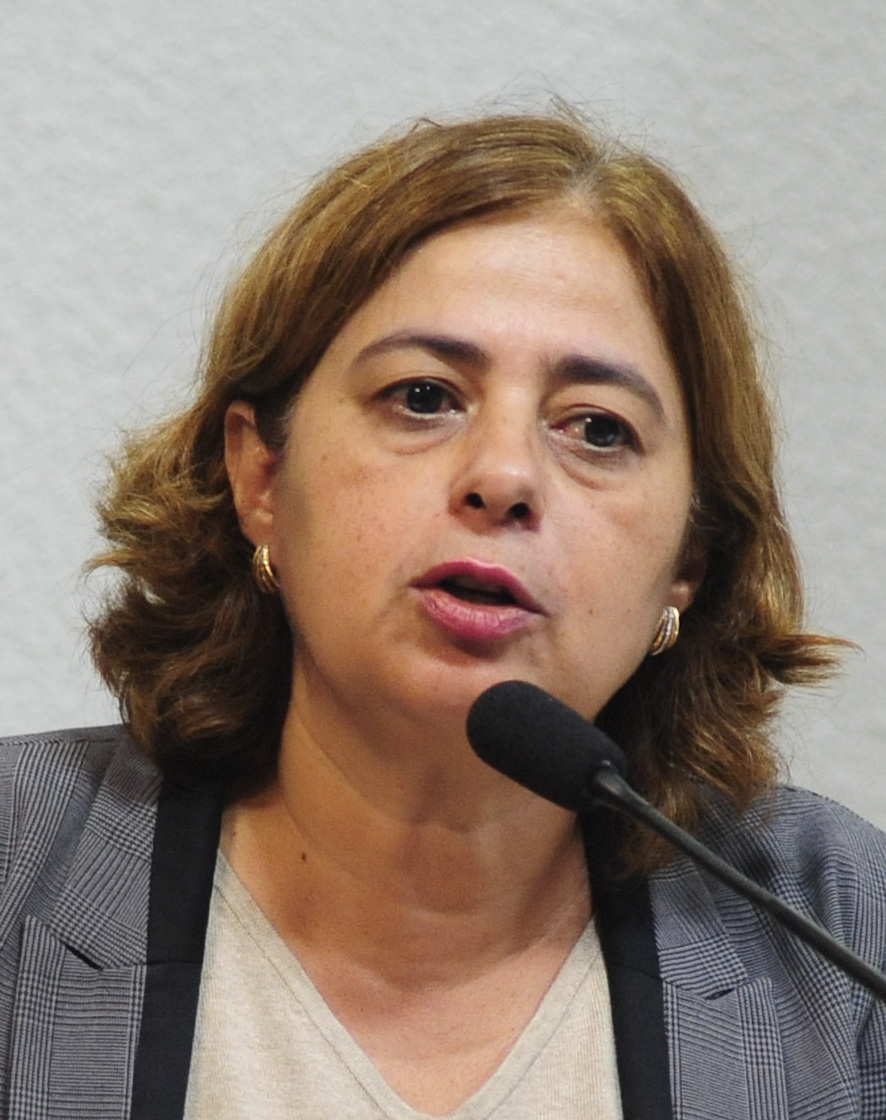
- Cida Gonçalves in 2015

Minister of Women
- In office 1 January 2023 – 5 May 2025
- President: Luiz Inácio Lula da Silva
- Preceded by: Cristiane Britto
- Succeeded by: Márcia Lopes

Personal details
- Born: Maria Aparecida Gonçalves; 1962 (age 63–64) Clementina, São Paulo, Brazil
- Party: PT (1980–present)

Maria Aparecida Gonçalves (born 1962 in Clementina) is a Brazilian advertiser person, feminist activist, consultant in public politics of gender and violence against women and former Minister of Women.

Acting in militancy for women's rights, Cida coordinated the process of articulation and foundation of the Popular Movements Center in Brazil. Cida was advisor at the Woman Coordination of the State Secretariat of Social Assistance, Citizenship and Labour of Mato Grosso do Sul in one of the José Miranda administrations as governor in the beginning of the 2000s and also in Lula and Rousseff presidencies as National Secretary of Violence Against Women. She is graduated in Advertising and Marketing.

== Minister of Women ==
In December 2022, Cida was announced as Minister of Women of the third Lula administration, assuming office on 1 January 2023.

The 2024 G20 Rio de Janeiro summit was scheduled for November. Cida was at the Empowerment of Women Working Group. Her speech made the point that ""We are not the periphery of the debates, we are the centrality".

Political offices
Preceded by Cristiane Britto as Minister of Woman, Family and Human Rights	Minister of Women; 2023–present	Incumbent
