= Márcia Lopes (politician) =

Brazilian social worker and politician

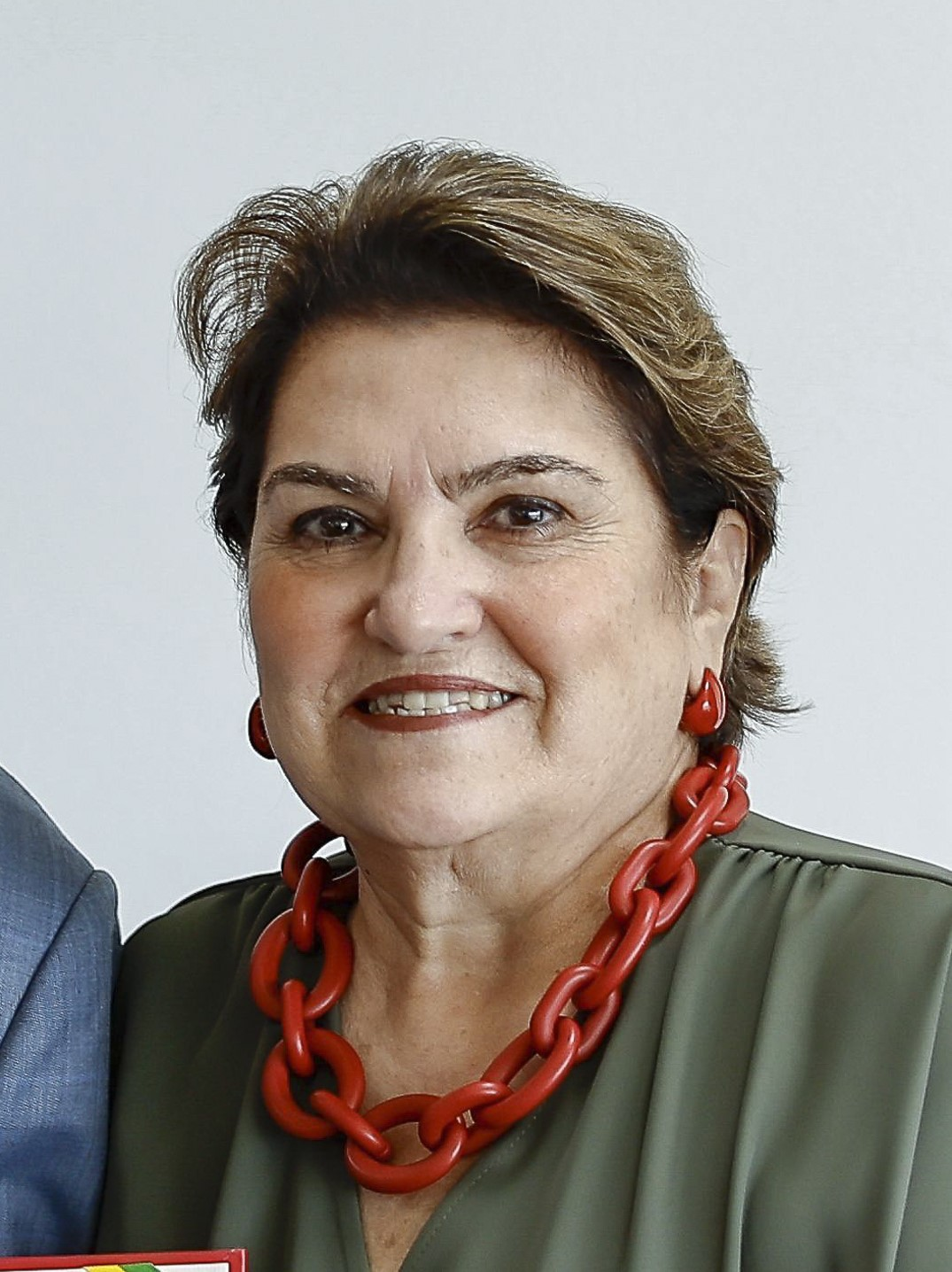

Minister of Women
- Incumbent
- Assumed office 5 May 2025
- President: Luiz Inácio Lula da Silva
- Preceded by: Cida Gonçalves

Minister of Social Development and Fight against Hunger
- In office 31 March 2010 – 1 January 2011
- President: Luiz Inácio Lula da Silva
- Preceded by: Patrus Ananias
- Succeeded by: Tereza Campello

Concilwoman of Londrina
- In office 1 January 2001 – 1 January 2005
- Constituency: At-large

Personal details
- Born: Márcia Helena Carvalho Lopes; 13 June 1957 (age 69) Londrina, Paraná, Brazil
- Party: PT (1982–present)
- Education: Londrina State University; Pontifical Catholic University of São Paulo

Márcia Helena Carvalho Lopes (born 13 June 1957) is a Brazilian social worker and politician. She is the current minister of Brazil's Ministry of Women.

Political offices
Preceded by Patrus Ananias	Minister of Social Development and Fight against Hunger; 2010–2011	Succeeded by Tereza Campello
Preceded by Cida Gonçalves	Minister of Women; 2025–present	Incumbent
