= Gustavo do Vale Rocha =

Brazilian politician (born 1973)

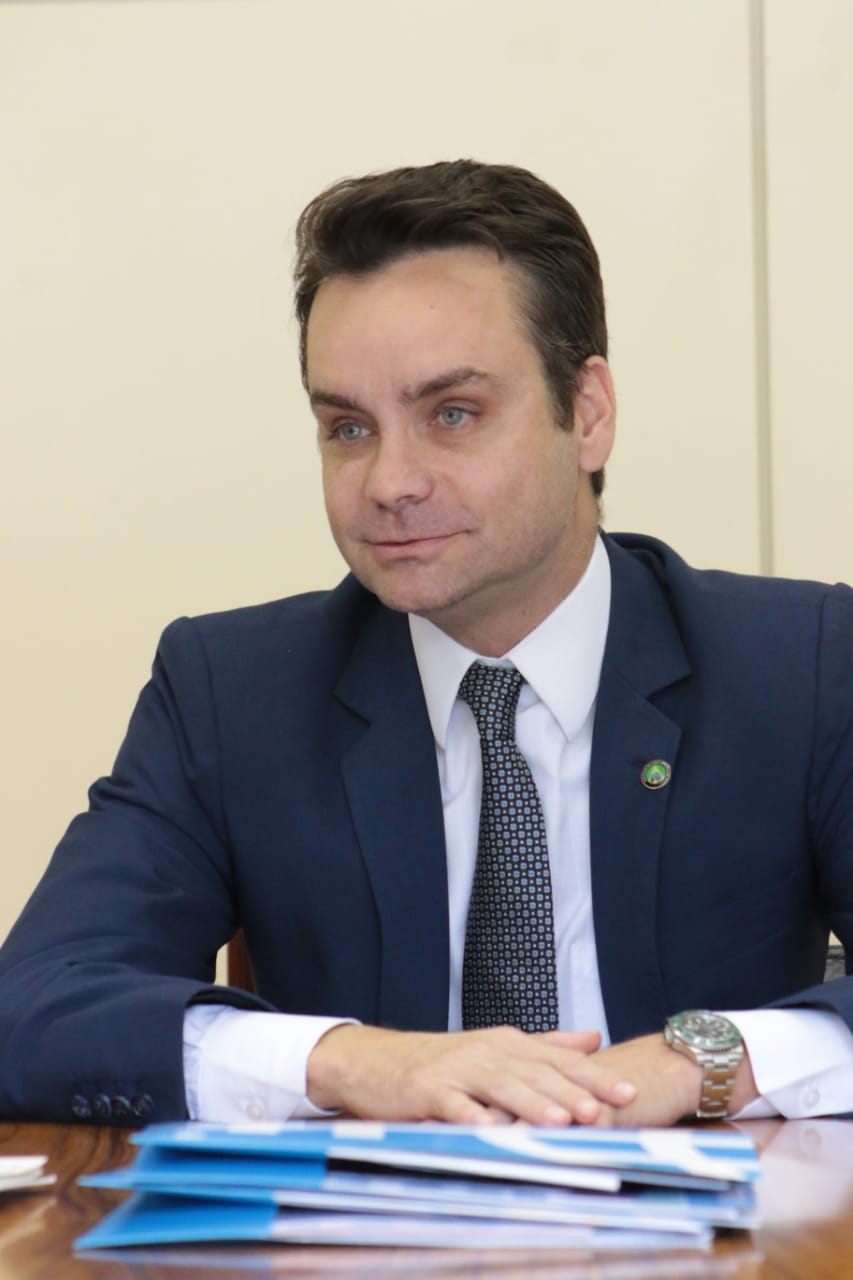
- Rocha in 2018

Minister of Human Rights
- In office 20 February 2018 – 31 December 2018
- President: Michel Temer
- Preceded by: Luislinda Valois
- Succeeded by: Damares Alves

Personal details
- Born: 23 January 1973 (age 53)
- Party: Independent
- Spouse: Marcela Passamani (m. 1999)

Gustavo do Vale Rocha (born 23 January 1973) is a Brazilian politician serving as chief of staff to Ibaneis Rocha since 2020. From February to December 2018, he served as minister of human rights.
