= Toni Reis =

Brazilian activist (born 1964)

- Antonio Luiz Martins Harrad Reis
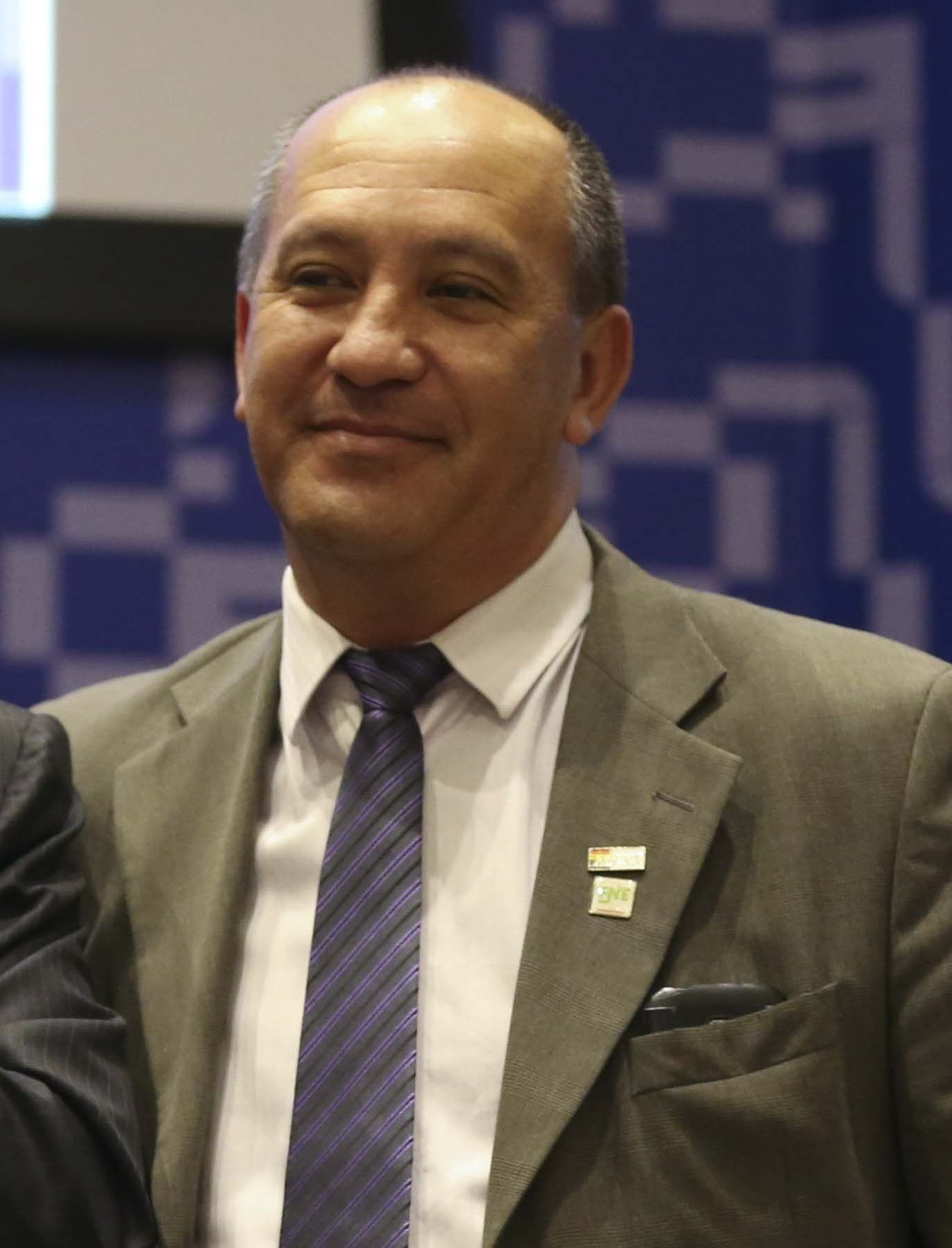
- Photo: Valter Campanato/Agência Brasil
- Born: Antonio Luiz Martins Reis; 20 June 1964 (age 62); Coronel Vivida, Brazil
- Known for: LGBT rights activism

Antonio Luiz Martins Harrad Reis (born 20 June 1964), known as Toni Reis, is a Brazilian activist and teacher. He is the former president of the LGBT organisation called Grupo Dignidade, and the former general secretary of the ABGLT of which he was a founding president in 1995, and a member of the international council of the Hirschfeld Eddy Foundation.

He is a teacher and specialist in human sexuality and group dynamics. He possesses a master's degree of philosophy in ethics and sexuality.

Toni Reis is also the Latin American coordinator for ASICAL (Association for Integral Health and Citizenship in Latin America and the Caribbean).

== Work ==
In 1998 Toni Reis described the situation in his country: "1,600 homosexuals have been murdered in the last ten years, of these 350 transvestites and 61 lesbians."

In 2006 he spoke before the Brazilian parliament, where he stated that 250 homosexuals per year are murdered in Brazil.

In 2007 he addressed the United Nations, in order to receive councillor status for his organization

== Personal ==
In 2003, Toni Reis obtained a permanent Brazilian residence permit for his life partner, who was born in the United Kingdom, in a landmark court case for Brazil.
