= Grupo Dignidade =

Brazilian LGBTQ organization

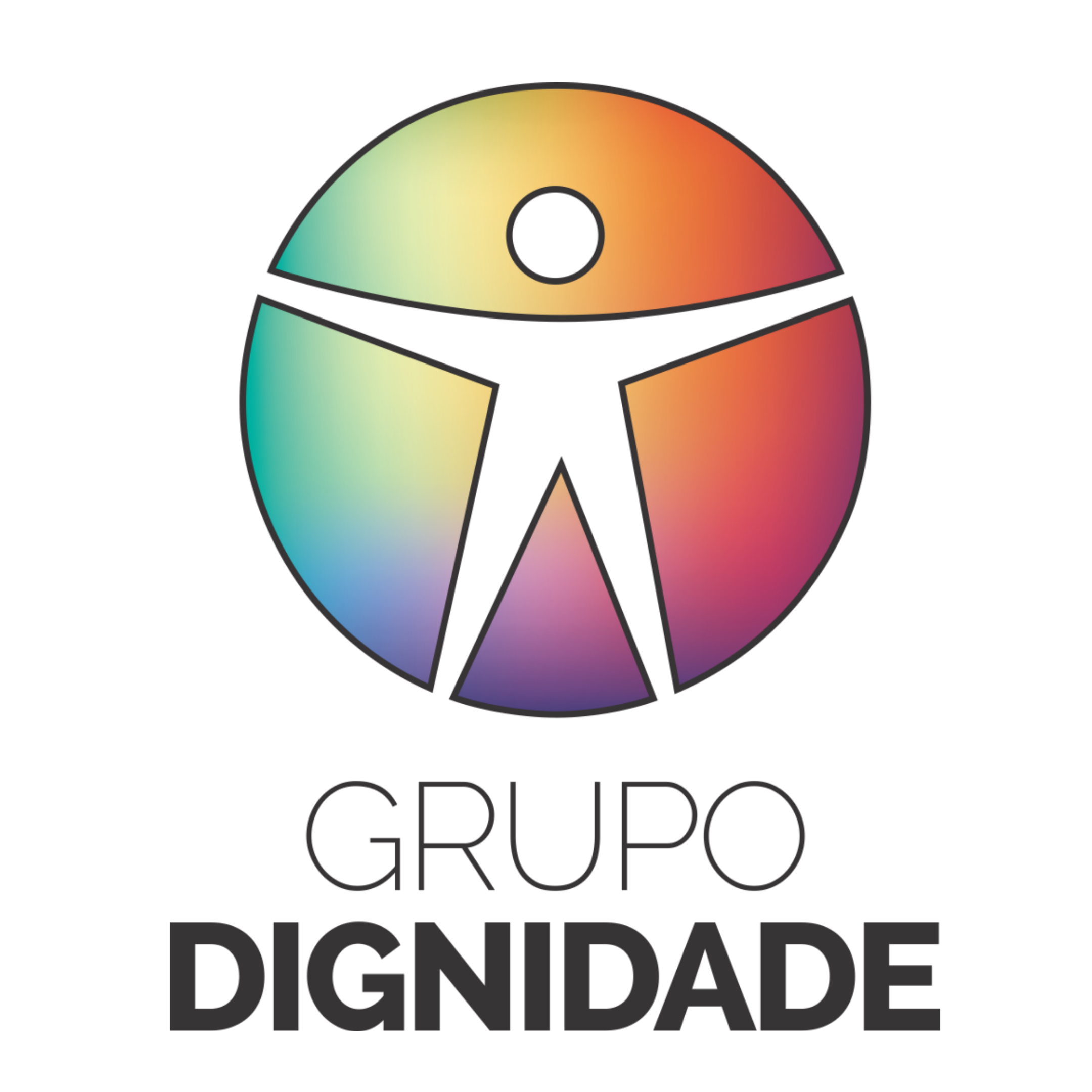
- Established: 14 March 1992
- Headquarters: Curitiba
- Location: Brazil
- Fields: LGBTQ rights

Grupo Dignidade (English: Group Dignity) is a Brazilian non-governmental and non-profit organization founded in 1992 in Curitiba. It is the first group formed in the state of Paraná which advocated for the citizenship of LGBTQ people. The group is a pioneer in advocating for and promoting free sexual orientation, gender identity and expression, as well as the human rights and citizenship of the LGBTQ community.

== History ==
Grupo Dignidade was established on 14 March 1992 in the city of Curitiba by Toni Reis and David Harrad. The name "dignidade" (dignity) is associated with pride, as in gay pride, and is named in honor of the International LGBTQ Pride Day, celebrated on 28 June annually since 1992. The group was the first LGBTQ organization in Brazil to receive the Federal Public Utility status, granted by a presidential decree on 5 May 1997. The group celebrated its 30th anniversary in 2022, and received tribute from the City Council of Curitiba.

== Activities ==
The group provides services such as psychotherapy, legal guidance, formation of support groups, and undertakes initiatives for the prevention of HIV other Sexually transmitted infections. It organizes community engagement activities such as Diversity March, lectures in schools, universities and companies, employment fairs, and cultural activities. It is also involved in the advocacy for public policies including dialogue with the municipal, state and federal governments for the promotion of rights of the LGBTQ people. It also organizes film discussion events and diversity cafes.

In July 2022, the group organized the fifth edition of the Diversity March, which happened began at Praça 19 de Dezembro (19 December Square) and concluded at Praça Nossa Senhora de Salete (Square of Our Lady of La Salette), in front of Palácio Iguaçu (Iguaçu Palace). It was held after a gap of two years in Curitiba, and attracted thousands of participants.
