= Silvio Almeida =

Brazilian lawyer, philosopher and university professor

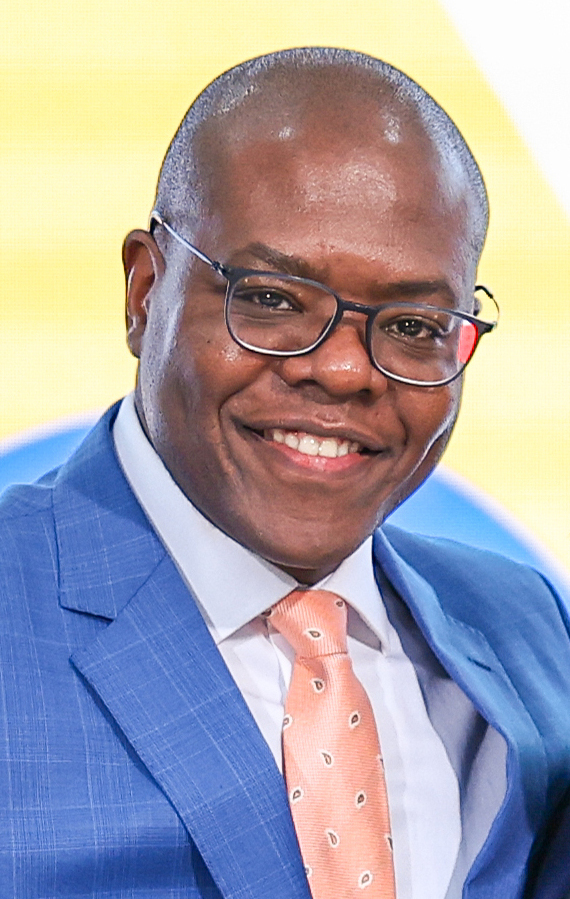
- Almeida in 2023

Minister of Human Rights and Citizenship
- In office 1 January 2023 – 6 September 2024
- President: Luiz Inácio Lula da Silva
- Preceded by: Cristiane Britto
- Succeeded by: Esther Dweck

Personal details
- Born: Silvio Luiz de Almeida; 17 August 1976 (age 50) São Paulo, Brazil
- Education: Mackenzie Presbyterian University (LLB, LLM); University of São Paulo (PhB, PhD)
- Occupation: Philosopher, lawyer, writer and professor

Silvio Luiz de Almeida (born 17 August 1976) is a Brazilian lawyer, philosopher, university professor, and the former Minister of Human Rights and Citizenship, from which he was fired after accusations of sexual harassment. Recognized as one of greatest Brazilian specialist on racial issues, Almeida is chair of Luiz Gama Institute and is author of book Racismo Estrutural, Sartre: Direito e Política and O Direito no Jovem Lukács: A Filosofia do Direito em História e Consciência

== Biography ==
Almeida was born in São Paulo and is the son of couple Verônica and Lourival. His father was a football goalkeeper and was popularly known as Barbosinha in his career and as player of Sport Club Corinthians Paulista.

Almeida has a Bachelor of Laws at Mackenzie Presbyterian University (1995–1999) and of Philosophy at University of São Paulo (2004–2011). He is Master of Political and Economical Laws at Mackenzie University and Doctor of Philosophy and General Theory of Laws at University of São Paulo.

Almeida is married to Edneia Carvalho and has a daughter.

== Career ==
Silvio Almeida has been a lawyer since 2000, working with business law, economical and tax law and human rights law.

From 2005 to 2019, he was professor of Philosophy of Laws and Introduction to the Study of Law at São Judas Tadeu University.

He is currently professor of the graduation course of Law and post-graduation stricto sensu in Political and Economical Law at Mackenzie Presbyterian University and professor at the Business Administration School and Law School of Getúlio Vargas Foundation.

In 2020, Almeida was a visiting professor at Duke University, in the United States. At Duke, he taught courses in "Race and the Law in Latin America" and "Black Lives Matter: Brazil and United States", the last one in partnership with professor John D. French.

In 2022, he was selected as Edward Larocque Tinker visiting professor at Columbia University, in New York City, destined to prestigious intellectuals of Latin America. This same seat was occupied in previous years by intellectuals such as economist Raúl Prebisch, geographer Milton Santos, journalist Elio Gaspari, jurist Roberto Gargarella, historian Lilia Schwarcz, among others. In Columbia, he administered the class of "Race, Law and Culture in Latin America".

On 22 June 2020, Almeida was interviewed in Roda Viva, on TV Cultura. His participation inspired a "book club" on social networks.

He is currently Chair of Luiz Gama Institute, a human rights organization focused in juridical defense of minorities and popular issues. Almeida actively acted in the creation of the "Pro-quotas Front" and was one the creators of affirmative action policies that were implemented in the state of São Paulo.

In 2021, he was rapporteur of the Jurists Commission of the Chamber of Deputies for the presentation of legislative proposals, specially focused on structural racism.

In 2020, he became columnist of politics on the Brazilian newspaper Folha de S. Paulo, acting suspended due to his nomination as one of the coordinators for the transition team of president-elect Luiz Inácio Lula da Silva.

== Work ==
In his works, Almeida works with concepts of authors such as Jean-Paul Sartre and György Lukács. In his texts, he talks about issues such as law, politics, philosophy, political economy and racial affairs. He was responsible for popularizing the concept of structural racism (proposed since the first racial critical studies in the 1960s), in which racism is conceived as arising from the own society structure. In his book, which is titled after his concept, Almeida applies this issue in many subjects, such as law, ideology, the economy and politics.

== Minister of Human Rights and Citizenship ==
On 22 December 2022, Almeida was announced as Minister of Human Rights and Citizenship of the third Lula administration, assuming office on 1 January 2023. On September 6, 2024, Silvio Almeida was fired from his government position following several accusations of sexual harassment against women, including racial equality minister Anielle Franco.

== See also ==
- Luís Gama

Political offices
Preceded by Cristiane Britto as Minister of Woman, Family and Human Rights	Minister of Human Rights and Citizenship; 2023–2024	Succeeded by Rita Cristina de Oliveira (acting)
