= Pedreiras, Maranhão =

Coordinates: 4.57389°S 44.5969°W

- Municipality
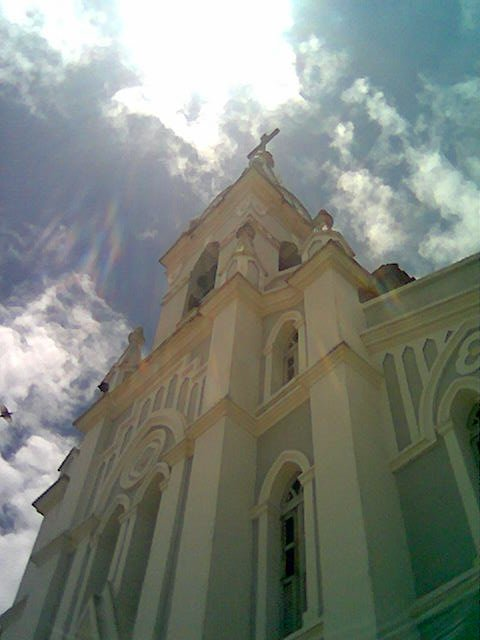

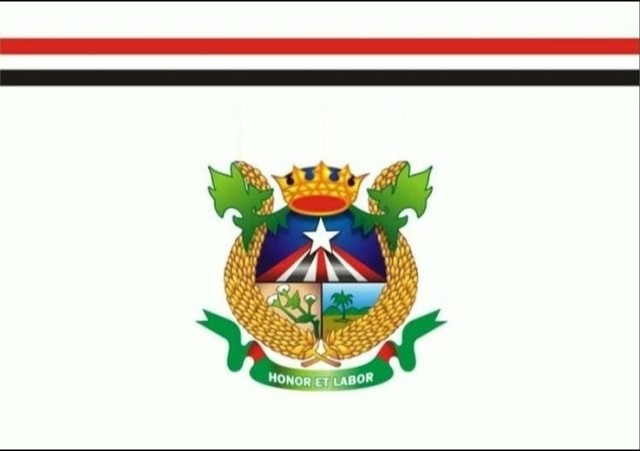
- Flag
- Interactive map of Pedreiras, Maranhão
- Country: Brazil
- Region: Nordeste
- State: Maranhão
- Mesoregion: Centro Maranhense

Population (2020)
  - Total: 39,191
- Time zone: UTC−3 (BRT)

Pedreiras, Maranhão is a municipality in the state of Maranhão in the Northeast region of Brazil.

== See also ==
- List of municipalities in Maranhão
