= Nilcéa Freire =

Brazilian academic and politician (1953–2019)

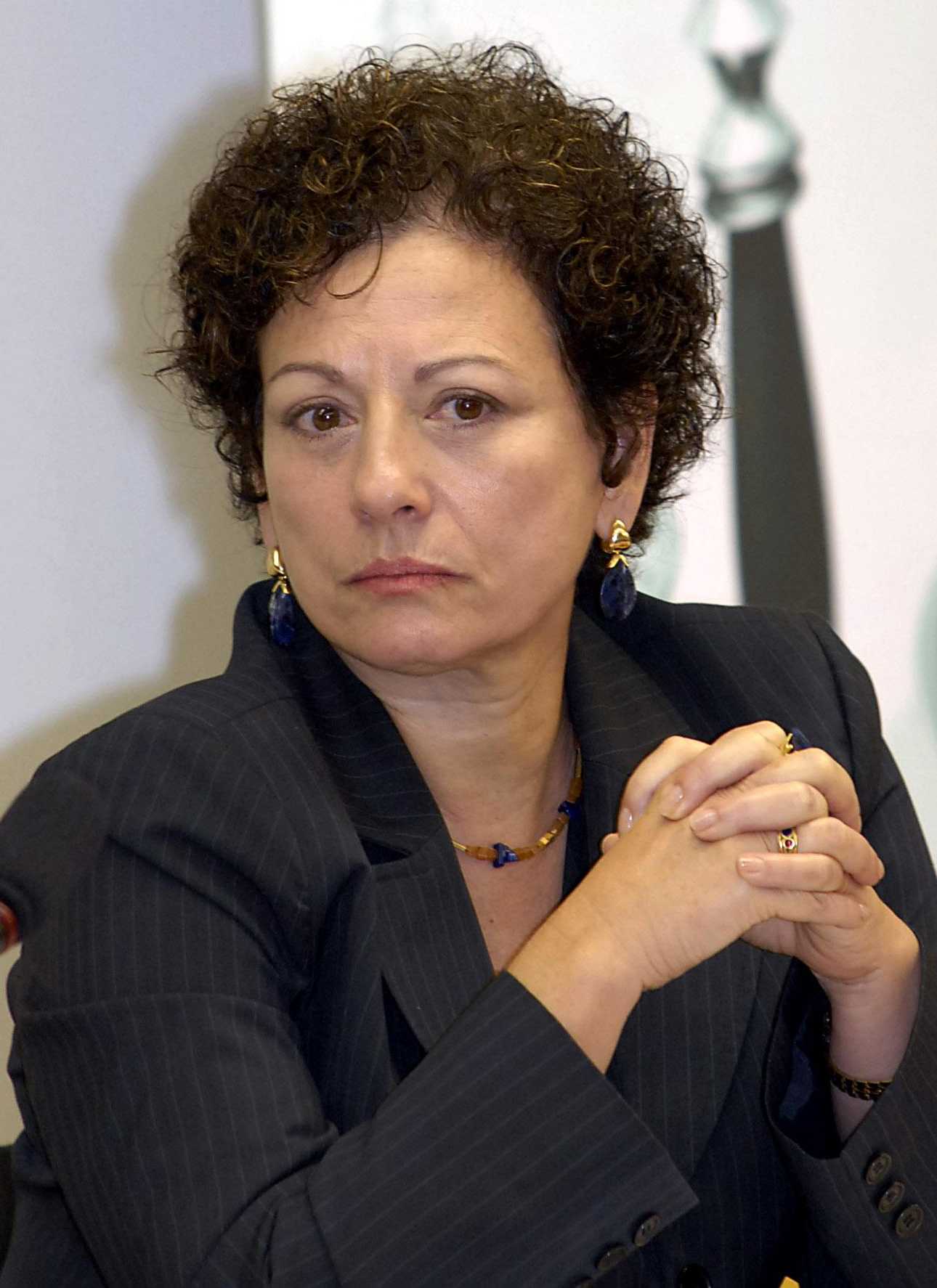
Nilcéa Freire, 2007

Nilcéa Freire (14 September 1953 – 28 December 2019) was a Brazilian academic and politician. After a career as a medical researcher and professor, Freire moved into university administration. She oversaw graduate studies and budgetary concerns before being promoted as dean of the State University of Rio de Janeiro. In 2004 she became a government minister, as the Special Secretariat of Policies for Women. She served from 2005 to 2007 as the President of the Inter-American Commission of Women. At the end of her term, she became the Brazilian representative for the Ford Foundation and oversaw their programs to promote opportunity and justice for underrepresented minorities.

== Biography ==
Nilcéa Freire was born in September 1953 in Rio de Janeiro, Brazil. She enrolled in the Federal University of Rio de Janeiro (UFRJ) in 1972, but was forced to suspend her studies between 1975 and 1977 for participation in student protests. During this period, she was exiled in Mexico, but returned to Brazil and graduated with a degree in medical science in 1978. After completing her residency, Freire enrolled in a Master's program in Zoology at the National Museum at UFRJ, conducting research on Schistosoma mansoni and other parasites which are prevalent in Brazil. She defended her dissertation in 1985, after a year of study at the Muséum national d'histoire naturelle (National Natural History Museum) in Paris.

== Career ==
In 1980, she began working at her alma mater, holding both administrative and teaching positions. She instructed on parasitology as well as participating in research and publication, the most cited of which was titled, Esquistossomosi mansoni em Sumidouro. Beginning in 1988 she became part of the university administration, serving as sub-rector of Graduate Studies and Research of until 1991, In 1992, Fréire attended the Management Institute and University Leadership course in Canada sponsored by the Council of Rectors of Brazilian Universities and the Organization of American States and upon her return became Director of Planning and Budget for UERJ between 1992 and 1995. In 1996, she was elected as University Vice Rector. In 1999, she became a dean and instituted an affirmative action policy, requiring UERJ to provide reserved places for low-income black students and those trained in public education. Between 2002 and 2004 she chaired the Rio de Janeiro State Education Council.

In 1995, she became affiliated with the Partido dos Trabalhadores, but had not previously been involved in feminist issues when on 27 January 2004, she was sworn in as Special Secretariat of Policies for Women during the government of president Luiz Inácio Lula da Silva. In July 2004, she held the First National Conference on Policies for Women, which was attended by more than 120,000 women from across the country. The National Plan of Policies for Women was developed as a result of concerns expressed at the consultation and focused on policies to improve the status of women. She held the position as President of the Inter-American Commission of Women from 2005 to 2007, overseeing international commitments to gender equality. The Second National Conference on Policies for Women was held in 2007 and included refugee women in the consultations. In 2008, she was involved in the debates on the right to abortion and argued that the right to choose should rest with the woman and her partner. After her political term ended in 2010, Freire joined the Ford Foundation in 2011 as the representative in Rio de Janeiro. She oversaw the foundation's efforts in Brazil, to expand opportunity and justice to underrepresented Brazilians, particularly to Afro-Brazilians and indigenous peoples.

== Death ==
Freire died on 28 December 2019 in Rio de Janeiro.
