= Ministry of Human Rights and Citizenship =

Government ministry of Brazil

- Portuguese: Ministério dos Direitos Humanos e da Cidadania
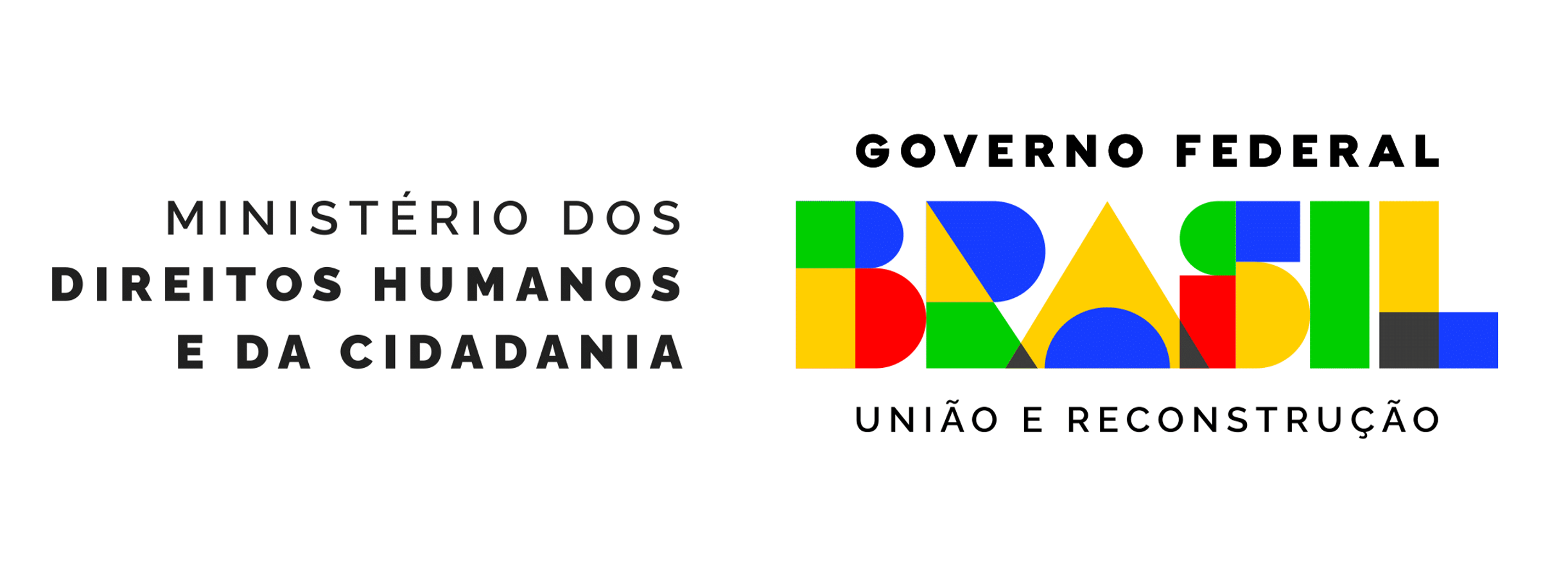

Agency overview
- Formed: 17 April 1997; 29 years ago
- Type: Ministry
- Jurisdiction: Federal government of Brazil
- Headquarters: Esplanada dos Ministérios, Bloco A Brasília, Federal District
- Annual budget: $576.4 m BRL (2023)
- Agency executives: Macaé Evaristo, Minister; Cilair Rodrigues de Abreu, Acting Executive-Secretary; Bruno Teixeira, Secretary of Promotion and Defense of Human Rights; Anna Paula Feminella, Secretary of People with Disabilities Rights; Symmy Larrat, Secretary of LGBTQIA+ People Rights; Alexandre da Silva, Secretary of Elderly People Rights; Cláudio Vieira da Silva, Secretary of Children and Teenagers Rights
- Website: www.gov.br/mdh/

The Ministry of Human Rights and Citizenship (Portuguese: Ministério dos Direitos Humanos e da Cidadania, MDHC), formerly the Ministry of Women, Family and Human Rights (2019–2022) and Secretariat for Human Rights of the Presidency of the Republic (1997–2015) is an office attached to the Presidency of Brazil. Its purpxose is to implement, promote, and protect human rights, civic rights, and the rights of children, adolescents, women, families, the elderly, and disabled people.

== Background ==
The Secretariat was created on 7 April 1997, during the first administration of Fernando Henrique Cardoso. Originally called the National Human Rights Secretariat (Secretaria Nacional dos Direitos Humanos), it was initially attached to the Ministry of Justice. On 1 January 1999, responsibility for the Secretariat was transferred to the President's office. On 28 May 2002, it was renamed Special Secretariat for Human Rights (Secretaria Especial dos Direitos Humanos). It assumed its current name on 25 March 2010, when it became an essential office of the Presidency.

MDHC is headed by the Minister of Human Rights and Citizenship (Ministro dos Direitos Humanos e da Cidadania), a ministerial-level position. The incumbent is Macaé Evaristo, who has been in office since 9 September 2024.

== Structure ==
=== Secretariats ===
- National Secretariat for the Rights of Children and Adolescents
- National Secretariat for the Rights of Elderly Persons
- National Secretariat for the Rights of Persons with Disabilities
- National Secretariat for the Rights of LGBT+ Persons

=== Collegiate bodies and councils ===
- National Council for Combat Against Discrimination Against LGBT+ Persons (CNCD/LGBT)
- National Council for Prevention and Combat Against Torture
- National Council for Rights of Children and Adolescents
- National Council for the Rights of Elderly Persons
- National Council for the Rights of Persons with Disabilities
- National Council for Human Rights

== Child abduction policy ==
=== International child abduction ===
MDHC operates as the Brazilian Federal Central Authority under the terms of article 6 of the 1993 Hague Adoption Convention. Besides this, the secretariat also acts as the central authority under the terms of article 6 of the 1980 Hague Convention on the Civil Aspects of International Child Abduction. In this respect, it functions as a conduit between other countries' central authorities and the various Regional Federal Tribunals in Brazil which deal with international child abduction cases. In this sense, it is the equivalent of the US Department of State's Office of Children's Issues and the UK's Office of the Official Solicitor.

Any application for the return of an abducted minor from Brazil must be directed to the central authority of the country from which the child was abducted. This central authority will then contact SDH, which will analyze and verify all the information and decide whether it complies with the requirements provided for under the Convention. Since the Secretariat has only an administrative and informational remit, it maintains a list of private lawyers that it recommends for Hague Convention cases. These lawyers, however, do not generally respond quickly to requests for assistance from abroad and they have been singularly unsuccessful in having children returned to their home countries. The Secretariat is required under its remit to liaise with the Federal Police of the Ministry of Justice and with Interpol, to locate and return minors who are reported as missing. However, reports from the parents of abducted children say that this is rarely done and that the office that deals with these matters is chaotic.

According to Decree No. 3951/01, SDH has only administrative and informational competence. It cannot decide cases involving parental kidnapping and return and visitation schedules for abducted children.; this is up to the federal courts.

=== MDHC and child abduction in Brazil ===
The neutrality of MDHC and its respect for international law has come under increased international focus and scrutiny because of growing concerns over International child abduction in Brazil. In the case of Sean Goldman, a child abducted from the US to Brazil in 2004 and held by his mother's family against the wishes of his father, then Special Secretary Paulo Vannuchi intervened publicly, claiming that the child should remain in Brazil even though this amounted to kidnapping and was against the terms of the Hague Convention. In a speech to the Brazilian parliament in April 2009, he claimed that if the child were allowed to visit his father in the US, he might end up being 'kidnapped', even though the child had been abducted to Brazil in the first place. International outrage and a highly public campaign severely damaged the image of SDH and the Brazilian judiciary and Sean Goldman was eventually returned to his father in December 2009 only after the US government withdrew trade benefits from Brazil.

The Special Secretary for Human Rights, in what some have labeled a damage-limitation exercise, visited the US Department of State for a full week in November 2009 to review longstanding cases involving the abduction of US children. During this trip, she and Brazilian Embassy officials met with the parents of children kidnapped and taken to Brazil, NGOs, members of the US Congress and a federal judge who works on Hague Convention cases. The secretary explained in detail resolutions made by the Brazilian Supreme Court and SDH's outreach and education campaign to address Brazilian judges’ lack of familiarity with the Convention and the supreme court's resolutions.

== List of ministers ==
No.	Portrait	Minister	Took office	Left office	Time in office	Party	President
1	José Gregori	José Gregori (1930–2023)	17 April 1997	26 June 2000	3 years, 70 days	PSDB	Fernando Henrique Cardoso (PSDB)
2	Gilberto Vergne Saboia	Gilberto Vergne Saboia (born 1942)	26 June 2000	2001	1 year	Independent	Fernando Henrique Cardoso (PSDB)
3	Paulo Sérgio Pinheiro	Paulo Sérgio Pinheiro (born 1944)	2001	1 January 2003	2 years	Independent	Fernando Henrique Cardoso (PSDB)
4	Nilmário Miranda	Nilmário Miranda (born 1947)	1 January 2003	10 August 2005	2 years, 221 days	PT	Luiz Inácio Lula da Silva (PT)
5	Mário Mamede Filho	Mário Mamede Filho (born 1946)	10 August 2005	21 December 2005	133 days	PT	Luiz Inácio Lula da Silva (PT)
6	Paulo Vannuchi	Paulo Vannuchi (born 1950)	21 December 2005	1 January 2011	5 years, 11 days	PT	Luiz Inácio Lula da Silva (PT)
7	Maria do Rosário	Maria do Rosário (born 1966)	1 January 2011	1 April 2014	3 years, 90 days	PT	Dilma Rousseff (PT)
8	Ideli Salvatti	Ideli Salvatti (born 1952)	1 April 2014	16 April 2015	1 year, 15 days	PT	Dilma Rousseff (PT)
9	Pepe Vargas	Pepe Vargas (born 1958)	16 April 2015	2 October 2015	169 days	PT	Dilma Rousseff (PT)
10	Nilma Lino Gomes	Nilma Lino Gomes (born 1961)	2 October 2015	12 May 2016	223 days	Independent	Dilma Rousseff (PT)
11	Luislinda Valois	Luislinda Valois (born 1942)	3 February 2017	19 February 2018	1 year, 16 days	PSDB	Michel Temer (MDB)
12	Gustavo do Vale Rocha	Gustavo do Vale Rocha (born 1973)	20 February 2017	31 December 2018	1 year, 314 days	Independent	Michel Temer (MDB)
13	Damares Alves	Damares Alves (born 1964)	1 January 2019	30 March 2022	3 years, 88 days	PP; Republicanos	Jair Bolsonaro (PSL)
14	Cristiane Britto	Cristiane Britto (born 1979)	30 March 2022	1 January 2023	277 days	Republicanos	Jair Bolsonaro (PL)
15	Silvio Almeida	Silvio Almeida (born 1976)	1 January 2023	6 September 2024	1 year, 249 days	Independent	Luiz Inácio Lula da Silva (PT)
16	Macaé Evaristo	Macaé Evaristo (born 1965)	9 September 2024	Incumbent	1 year, 281 days	PT	Luiz Inácio Lula da Silva (PT)
