= Associação Brasileira de Lésbicas, Gays, Bissexuais, Travestis, Transexuais e Intersexos =

Brazilian LGBTQ network

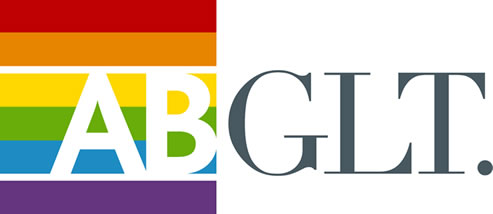

The Brazilian Gay, Lesbian, Bisexual, Travesti, Transsexual and Intersex Association (Associação Brasileira de Gays, Lésbicas, Bissexuais, Travestis, Transexuais e Intersexos or ABGLT), is a national network made up of 203 member groups, including about 141 gay, lesbian, and trans groups, and about 62 "collaborating" organizations which are involved with human rights and AIDS. Since July 2009, ABGLT has consultative status with the United Nations Economic and Social Council.

It was established by 31 founding groups on January 31, 1995. The organization claims to be the largest LGBTQ network in Latin America.

In 2017, ABGLT elected a travesti as its president for the first time. That same year, the organization included "intersex" in its institutional name, even without adding the letter "I" to the initial.

== See also ==
- Travesti
- LGBTQ rights in Brazil
- List of LGBTQ rights organizations
