= Domestic violence in Brazil =

Domestic violence in Brazil involves any type of violence or abuse by intimate partners or family members against one another. The majority of domestic violence cases in Brazil are performed by the man against their female partners. In 2015, the government released a study that showed that every seven minutes a woman was a victim of domestic violence in Brazil, over 70% of the Brazilian female population will suffer some kind of violence throughout their lifetime and 1 in every 4 women reports being a victim of psychological or physical violence. In 2017, Brazil had an estimate of 606 cases of violence and 164 cases of rape per day, over 60 thousand cases throughout the year. It is also estimated that only 10% of the cases are registered to the police. Although Brazil acknowledged that domestic violence was a problem in the 1940s, the Government has only acted upon it from 1980s onwards, with the creation of the Women Police Stations (Delegacia da Mulher) and later in 2006, with the publication of the Domestic Violence law.

Domestic violence is legally defined in Article 5 of the Domestic Violence Law of 2006 as "any action or omission of action motivated by gender that results in death, lesion, physical, sexual or psychological suffering, moral or patrimonial hazard". Although the legal definition is explained extensively in the law, the identification of domestic violence is a responsibility of the victims or closer relatives.

== Background ==
According to the NGO Marias, there are several causes to the practice of domestic violence, such as alcoholism, adultery, jealousy, drugs, financial problems, and, according to professor Matthew Guttmann, anthropologist that studies masculinity for the Brown University, the main cause of domestic violence is sexism or machismo (in Portuguese). In his study, professor Guttmann proves that, against the common belief, the male violent behavior is not physiological or biological characteristic, but is the result of the culture of machismo, predominant in most societies, that reinforce the man's superiority to women.

In the Brazil colony period, men were considered to be "owners" of women they married, entitled to beat, violent or even kill, if necessary. A research conducted by UN Women and Grupo Boticário shows that even nowadays, 95% of women and 81% of interviewed men agree with the affirmation that machismo is predominant in Brazil. According to professor Stela Meneghel, post-doctor physician specialized in gender studies, the violence practiced against women aims to keep them in an inferior position in relation to men, while men usually fell they have to "educate" women about their duties and their position.

A study from the Instituto de Pesquisa Econômica Aplicada (Ipea) shows evidence of widespread machismo in Brazil. According to the 2014 study, Brazilian society still believes in a patriarchal nuclear family in which the man is perceived as the breadwinner, but his rights over women and children are restricted and exclude open and extreme forms of violence. The women, on the other side, should "give herself respect" and behave according to the traditional family models.

The survey reveals acceptance of some kind of intervention in domestic violence themes: 85% of interviewees responded that in cases of violence, the couple should divorce; and over 90% agree that men that beat women should go to jail. The survey also shows that the Brazilian population is well informed regarding the origins of violence, 75% of interviewees disagree that violence is part of the male nature. However, There is evidence of widespread sexism, 58,5% of the interviewees believe that if women knew how to behave, there would be less rape cases and over 65% of interviewees agree that women that use clothes that show their bodies deserve to be attacked. There is also evidence of the widespread belief that the victim of violence should be the one to take action against it as reported that 65,1% of the interviewees report that victims of domestic violence that don't leave the abusive partners, like to be beaten. This assumption ignores all the social and psychological issues involved in an abusive relationship that may retrain a victim of domestic violence from reporting and leaving an abusive relationship. There are researches that propose a positive correlation between financial difficulties and violence: in scenarios of economical uncertainty and instability, the women is 1/3 more likely to be victim of domestic violence.

A research conducted by DataSenado in 2015 shows that 100% of the women interviewed knew about the existence of the Maria da Penha Law, showing the increasing education of the female population regarding their rights. However, 43% reported not to be treated with respect, an increase of 8 percentage points (vs 2013 survey), which may also indicate a change of the common belief of what if to be "treated right". In addition, women reported they feel more safe and started to identify and report more frequently the domestic violence cases. The same research shows that approximately 21% of the victims of domestic violence do not look for help and the main reasons reported are concern with children (24%), fear of aggressor's revenge (21%), belief that the episode would be the last one (16%), disbelief in the appropriate legal consequences (10%) and shame (7%).

A survey from the Justice Ministry reveals that 80% of the domestic violence victims do not want the aggressor to be imprisoned. The victims offer alternative solutions, such as psychological treatment (40%), aggressors discussion groups (30%) and mandatory services to the community (10%) and 9% of the women interviewed reported they felt totally or partially guilty by the violence suffered. To the professor Cristiane Brandão, Criminal Law professor at the Federal University of Rio de Janeiro (UFRJ), these numbers are the result of the predominant patriarchal and sexist Brazilian society.

== Law ==
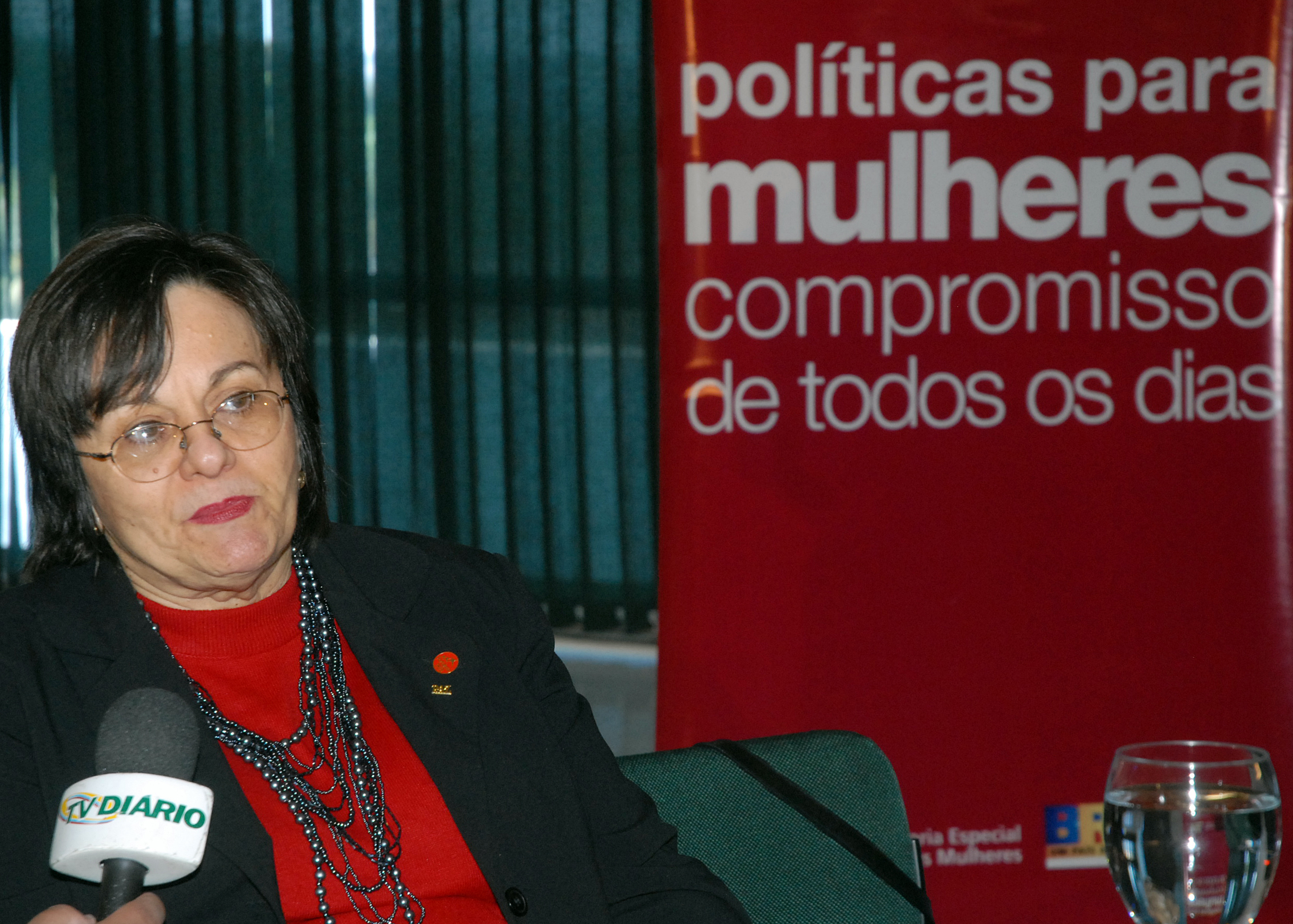
Maria da Penha, the woman who inspired the Domestic Violence Law in Brazil

The Brazilian Constitution of 1988 previews equal rights to men and women, however, the first legal formalization against domestic violence was published only 18 years after constitution. The Brazilian famous law, Lei Maria da Penha was the result of an international process led by Maria da Penha herself. A victim of domestic violence, Maria da Penha Fernandes, was shot at by her husband with a rifle, who also tried to electrocute her in the bathroom. As a consequence, she became paralytic and started a long battle in court to convict her husband. In the 1990s, Maria da Penha appealed to the Inter-American Commission on Human Rights and, in 2001, she was able obtain justice and hold the Brazilian Government accountable for judicial tolerance of domestic violence. The commission also recommended that the Brazilian Government adopt more effective measures against women violence.

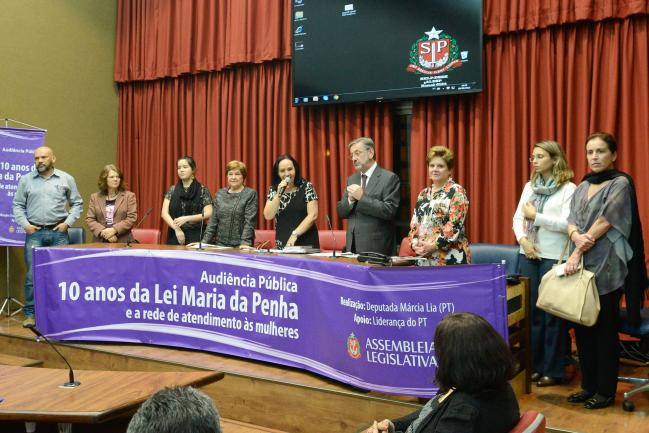
In 2016, the Maria da Penha Law complete 10 years

=== Domestic Violence Law 2006 (Law 11.340/2006) ===
The first legal form of protection for victims of domestic violence was published on August 7, 2006, by President Lula, who signed the Law of Domestic and Family Violence, also known as Lei Maria da Penha. The law previews mainly five types of domestic violence, as presented below:

1. Psychological Violence: cursing, humiliating, threatening, intimidating, frightening, continually criticizing, devalue someone's acts in private or in public, and exercising any kind of emotional manipulation;
2. Physical Violence: hitting, spanking, pushing, throwing objects, bitting, mutilating, torturing, using or not domestic tools, such as knives or working tools or gun;
3. Sexual Violence: non-consented sexual relationships (i.e. while the partner is sleeping), forcing the partner to look pornographic material, forcing partner to have sex with other people, prevent women from controlling usage of non-pregnancy drugs, forcing abortion or preventing women from getting pregnant;
4. Patrimonial Violence: control, retain or take someone's money, cause damage to other personal objects on purpose, retain partner's personal objects, personal documents or work documents from her;
5. Moral Violence: offend or humiliate the partner in public, expose the intimacy of the couple, including in social media, public accusing the partner of committing crimes;

Brazilian law prohibits domestic violence, and the government has taken steps that specifically address violence against women and spousal abuse. The law triples previous punishments for those convicted of such crimes, and also creates special courts in all states to preside over these cases. It is also the first official codification of domestic violence crimes.

The Superior Court of Justice (Brazil) has reinforced the law, by starting legal processes with only the violence event police report with no need of the violence victim being present or being the main complainer.

=== Update of Rape crimes in the Criminal Code (Law 12.015/2009) ===
In 2009, the criminal code was updated to consider rape as a crime against the dignity and the sexual liberty, recognizing that all individuals, independently of gender, have the right to demand respect to their sexual lives and the obligation to respect the sexual option of other people.

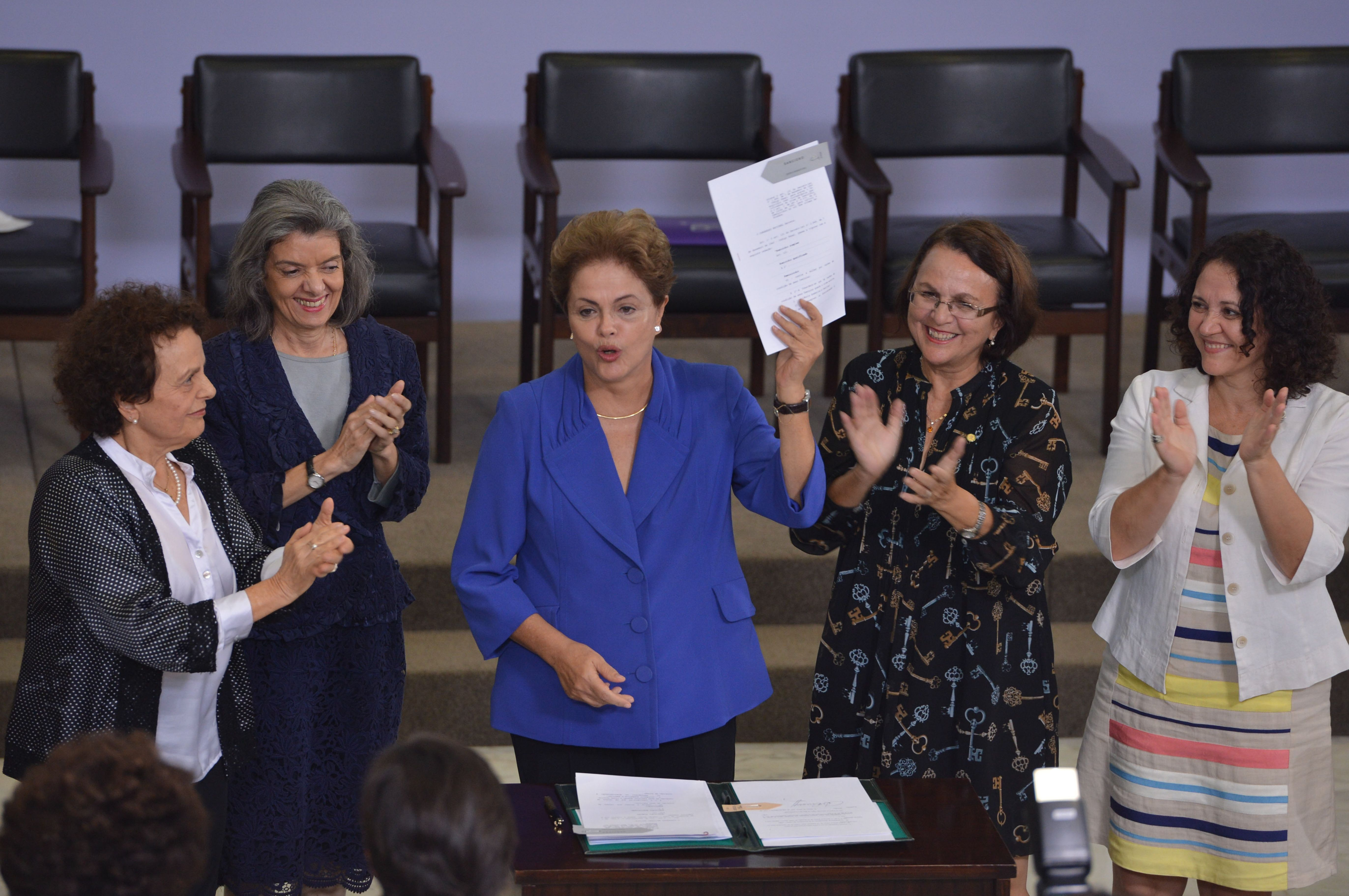
Dilma Rousseff, former president of Brazil signs the feminicide law.

=== Feminicide Law of 2015 (Law 13.103/2015) ===
In 2015, President Dilma Rousseff approved the Feminicide Law that altered the Brazilian Criminal Code to preview the feminicide as type of homicide and a hideous crime. Feminice is the murder of women simply by their condition of women. Feminicide crimes are motivated by hate, despise or the sentiment of loss of property over the woman.

The law previews aggravating conditions that increase the legal penalty in 1/3, such as (i) crime committed during pregnancy or 3 months after child labor, (ii) crime committed against women less than 14 years old, more than 60 years old or with disability, (iii) crime committed in the presence of the parents or the children of the victim.

== Government action ==
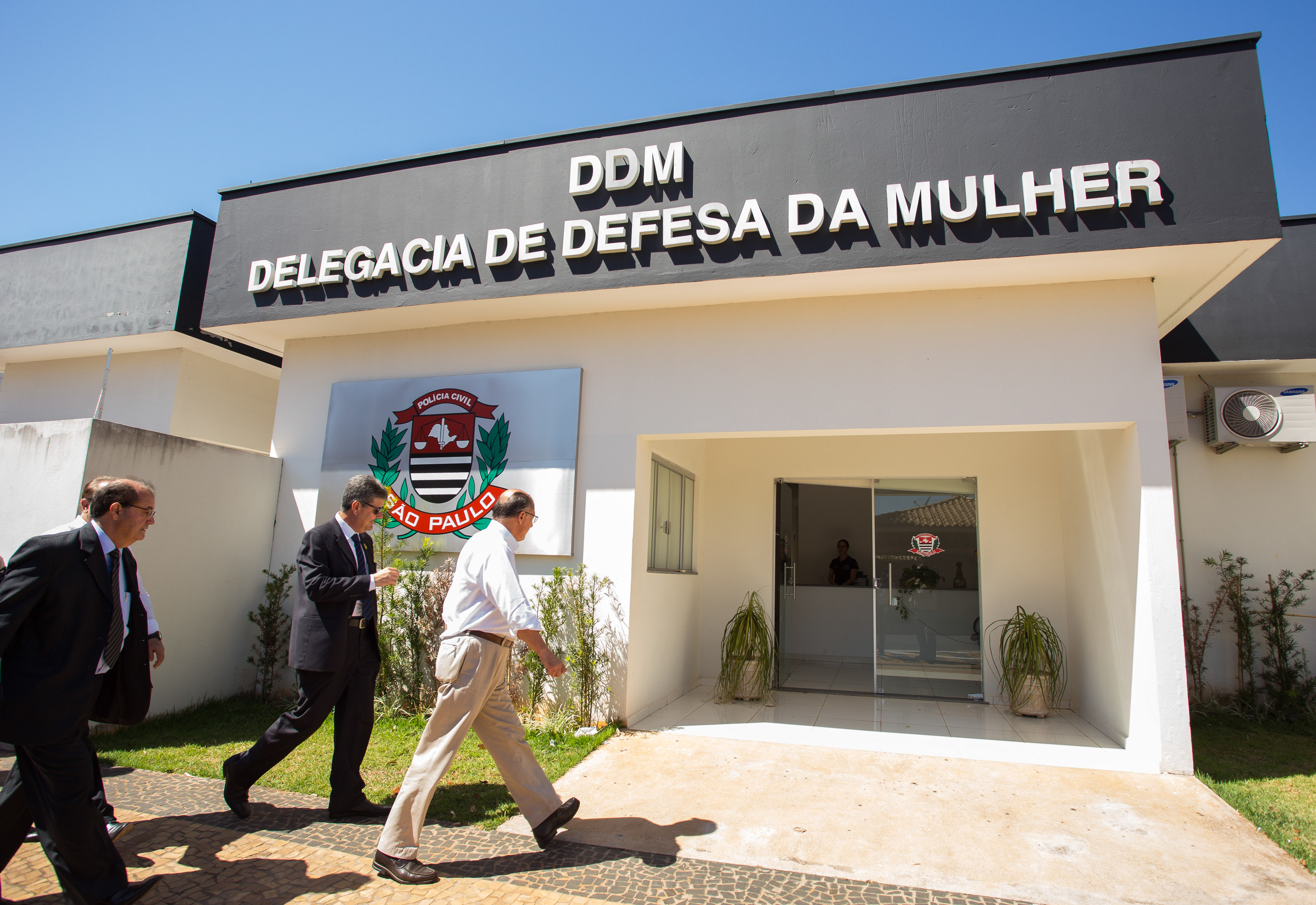
Delegacia de Defesa a Mulher

Delegacia da Mulher: The government acted to combat violence against women. Each state secretariat for public security operated delegacias da mulher (DEAM). These police stations are dedicated exclusively to addressing crimes against women. The quality of services varied widely, and availability was particularly limited in isolated areas. The stations provided psychological counseling, temporary shelter, and hospital treatment for victims of domestic violence and rape (including treatment for HIV and other sexually transmitted diseases).

The stations also provided assistance to prosecution of criminal cases by investigating and forwarding evidence to the courts. According to the Ministry of Justice, while many of the DEAMs fell far short of standards and lacked strategies to protect victims after the reports were filed, they nevertheless served to raise public awareness of crimes against women.

"Mulher, Viver sem Violencia" Program: Launched on March 13, 2013, by the president Dilma Rousseff, this initiative aims to expand and improve the public services offered to women victims of violence. The program includes a series of initiatives as presented below:

1. Ligue 180: In 2005, the federal government implemented a toll-free hotline to address complaints of violence against women, provided by the Women's Ministry and the Special Secretary of Women's Policies. The toll-line not only receives complaints of violence, but also orients victims regarding their legal entitlements and refer victims to other public services when applicable. In 2015, the toll line registered 749.024 calls, an average of 2.052 calls per day. Since its implementation, the Ligue 180 has already registered 4.823.140 calls. Approximately 2/3 of the calls received are to report some kind of domestic violence; 41,09% of the calls received request more information, 9,56% are referred to special services to support women, 38,54% refer to other services such as Military Police, Civil police or Human Rights Secretary.

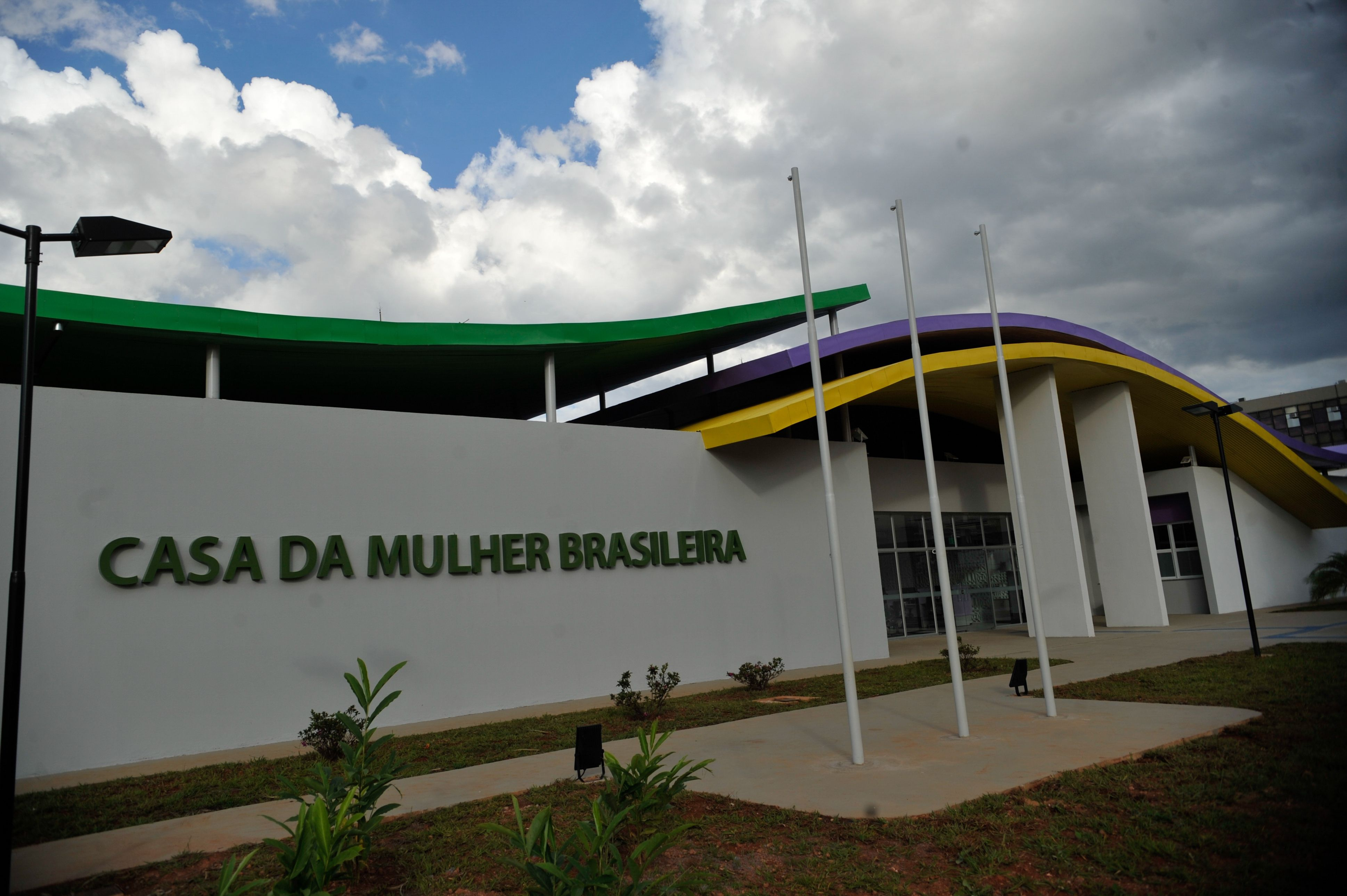
Casa da Mulher Brasileira

2. Casa da Mulher Brasileira: The Brazilian Women House is a humanized center of services to support the woman victim of violence. These institutions perform the triage of victims, offer psychological support and have special areas for children. They also englobe a number of public services, such as police stations, court, Public Ministry and transportation services center.

3. Humanization of the Service provided by Sexual Violence Victims: new procedures have been implemented to treat the victims of sexual violence in a more humanized and effective way in the Public Hospitals and Centers of Public Health. The program also includes training of professionals in the new protocol.

4. Women Care Centers in the Drought Regions: implementation of seven centers to support women migrants victims of violence and help detain women trafficking.

5. Awareness Campaigns: several media campaigns aimed at orienting the population about the services provided by the government as well as change the social norms of sexism and stereotypes.

6. Mobile Care Units: buses and boats specially equipped to provide care, health and legal services to women in remote locations. In 2015, over 53 mobile units were implemented.

The law requires health facilities to contact the police regarding cases in which a woman was harmed physically, sexually, or psychologically.

Despite the formal and legal actions taken by the Federal Government, local governments seem to still struggle with the law enforcement, with reports of lack of action of the police and courts in many cases, even after the violence was reported to authorities. UN Special Rapporteur Leandro Despouy noted a tendency to blame the victims of these offenses. According to government officials and NGO workers, the majority of criminal complaints regarding domestic violence were suspended inconclusively.

== Incidence ==
According to the World Health Organization, 35% of women have already suffered from physical and/or sexual violence from intimate partners or sexual violence from a nonintimate partners during their lives. Brazil occupies the 5th position in the domestic violence crime index, preceded only by El Salvador, Colombia, Guatemala and Russia. In 2013, 4,762 women were murdered in Brazil and 50.3% of these crimes were committed by family members and 33.2% of these crimes were committed by the current or ex-partner.

A study sponsored by the United Nations and the World Health Organization and the Brazilian Government found that 106.093 women were murdered in Brazil between 1980 and 2013. According to the Mapa da Violencia 2015 report, the femicide rates have been growing and have reached 4.8% of the women population in 2013.

Year	Number of female homicides	% of population
1980	1.353	2,3
1990	2.585	3,5
2000	3.743	3,7
2010	4.465	4,6
2013	4.762	4,8

=== Regional Differences ===
In 2013, regional states presented significant difference in the incidence of women murders. Roraima was the estate with the highest incidence, of 15,3% of women murdered and São Paulo was the estate with the lowest incidence of 2,9%. Brazil average women homicide rate was 4,8% in 2013.

=== Race Differences ===
According to the Mapa da Violencia 2015 report, the black population is the main victim of domestic violence and homicides in the country. The homicide rates of the white population have been falling (-9,8% between 2003 and 2013), while the homicide rates among black population keep rising (+54,2% between 2003 and 2013).

=== Age Difference ===
According to the Mapa da Violencia 2015 report, about 2/3 of the population attended on the Brazilian Public Health System (Sistema Único de Saúde) are women. In 2014, 22.796were attended victims of several types of violence.

Distribution by sex and age of the number of victims of violence registered in the SUS

	Numbers			
Phase	Females	Males	Non-id	Total
Child (0–11 years)	20,707	17,411	130	38,248
Adolescence (12–17 years)	24,708	13,248	9	37,965
Young (18–34 years)	42,442	18,213	16	60,671
Adult (34–59 years)	52,979	21,264	13	74,256
Elderly (more than 59 years)	6,855	5,800	1	12,656
Total	147,691	75,936	169	223,796

=== Types of Violence ===
According to the 2015 Balance of the Ligue 180 toll-free line, 76,651 reports of violence were registered, being: 38.451 reports of physical violence (50.15%); 23,247 reports of psychological violence (30.33%); 5.556 reports of moral violence (7.25%); 3.961 reports of home imprisonment (5.17%) 3.478 reports of sexual violence (4.54%); 1.607 reports of patrimonial violence (2.10%); 351 report of people trafficking (0.46%).

=== The Aggressor ===
According to the Mapa da Violencia 2015 report, 82% of aggressions to female children were performed by the child's parents, mainly the mother, that concentrates 42,2% of aggressions. For adolescents, the main offender are the parents (26,5%) and current or ex-partners (23,2%). Young and adult population, in more than 50%, are offended by current or ex-partners. For the elderly population, the main offender was an offspring (34,9%). A study conducted by IPEA in 2013 concludes that approximately 30% of the deaths of women classified as feminicide happened in their own house.

== Local attitudes and activism ==
In a 2017 study conducted by IPSOS and Avon Institute, political scientist Céli Pinto, professor of the Federal University of Rio Grande do Sul (UFRGS) and author of book “Uma História do Feminismo no Brasil” (History of Feminism in Brazil) argues that recent episodes of domestic violence have fomented a "renaissance of feminism", named "Feminism Spring" in the study that aim to eliminate sexism and violence against women.

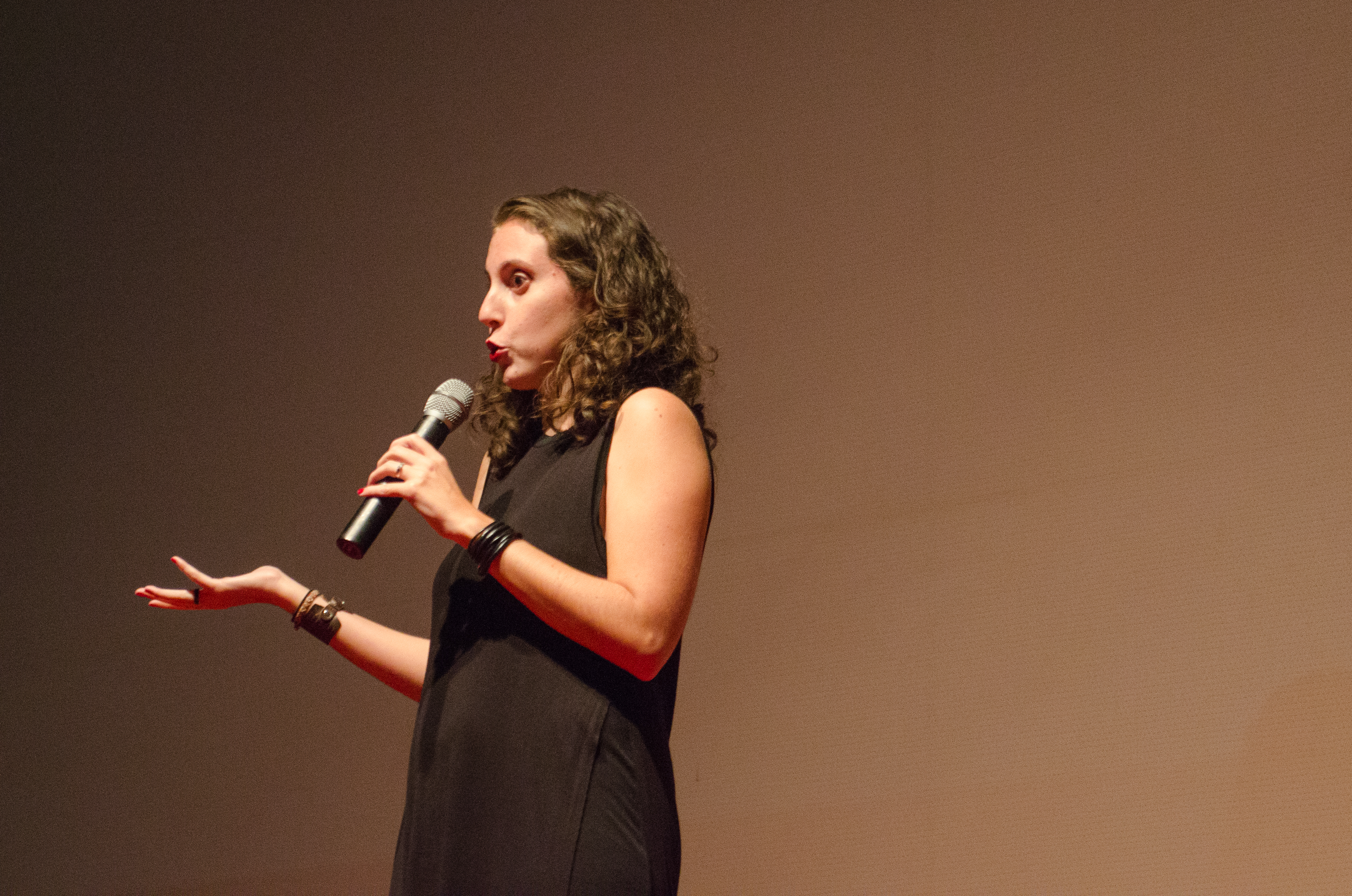
Jout Jout, Brazilian YouTuber

Online campaign have gained popularity since 2014, with the movement #NãoMereçoSerEstuprada (I Do Not Deserve to Be Raped) launched after the publishing of the results of the IPEA survey "Tolerancia Social a Violencia contra Mulher" in which over 65% of interviewees agreed that women who wear clothes that show their bodies deserve to be raped. In 2015, Jout Jout, a Brazilian YouTuber, published a video on abusive relationships that inspired the movement #NãoTiraOBatomVermelho (Keep Your Red Lipstick On). In 2016, sexual remarks towards one of the girls participating in the TV show Masterchef Junior, another social media movement #PrimeiroAssedio (First Harassment) encouraged women from all ages to share their first experience in which they suffered sexual harassment. Other hashtags such as #ChegaDeFiuFiu (No More Catcalls) and #MeuAmigoSecreto (My Secret Friend) also tried to call attention on sexist behaviors on day-by-day activities, such as walking on the streets or working.

In 2018, elevator footage of Luis Filipe Manvalier beating his wife Tatiane Spitzner, who eventually died, was aired on the popular Fantastico TV program set off national discussion and the social media hashtag #metaAcolher (Stick a Spoon in, a reference to butting into a domestic dispute).

In addition to the online campaigns, street movements have also been constant, with the constant presence and awareness of the theme of violence against women: the Marcha das Margaridas (March of the Daisies), more than 70,000 people marched against violence against women. In 2015 ENEM, Brazil's standardized college qualification exam, the topic of the essay was “The Persistence of Violence against Women in Brazilian Society.” Recent episodes have also been receiving criticism. Faustão, one of the most famous TV show hosts said that "women like to be beaten". NGOs and activists asked the TV program to apologize to the public and people on social media.

== See also ==
- Lei Maria da Penha
- Femicide
- Violence against women in Brazil
- Women's police stations

General:

- Women in Brazil
- Crime in Brazil
