= Flávia Biroli =

Brazilian political scientist

Flávia Millena Biroli Tokarski
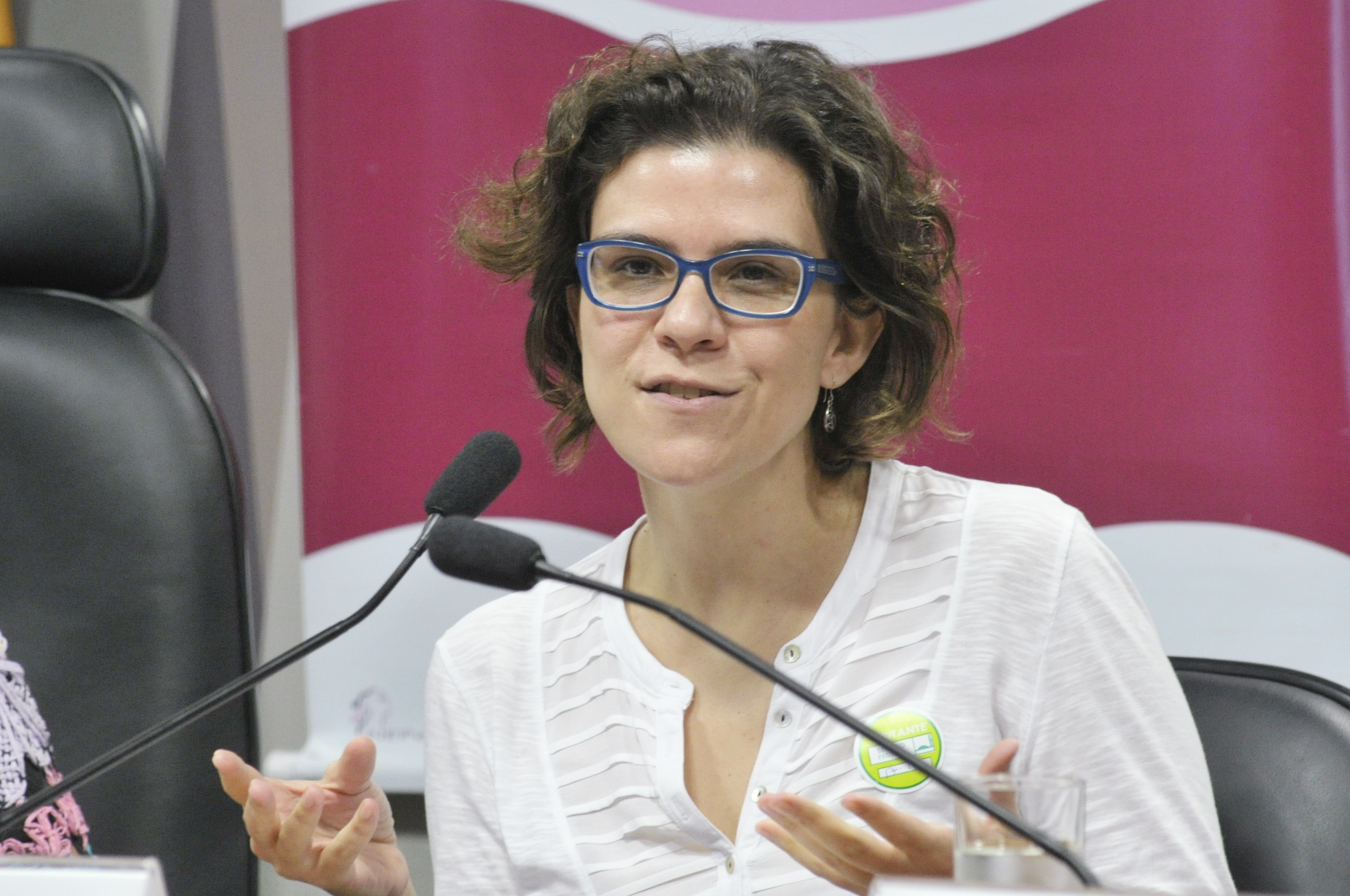
- Born: 1975 (age 50–51); São José do Rio Preto
- Known for: Autonomia e desigualdades de gênero: contribuições do feminismo para a crítica democrática
- Scientific career
- Fields: Political scientist; Historian

Flávia Biroli is a Brazilian political scientist. She is the author of several books about democracy, gender, and the media. She is a professor of political science at the University of Brasília and a specialist in feminist political theory.

== Life ==
Biroli was born in 1975 in the city of São José do Rio Preto. She has a doctorate in history from Unicamp and she became a professor of political science at the University of Brasília in 2005.

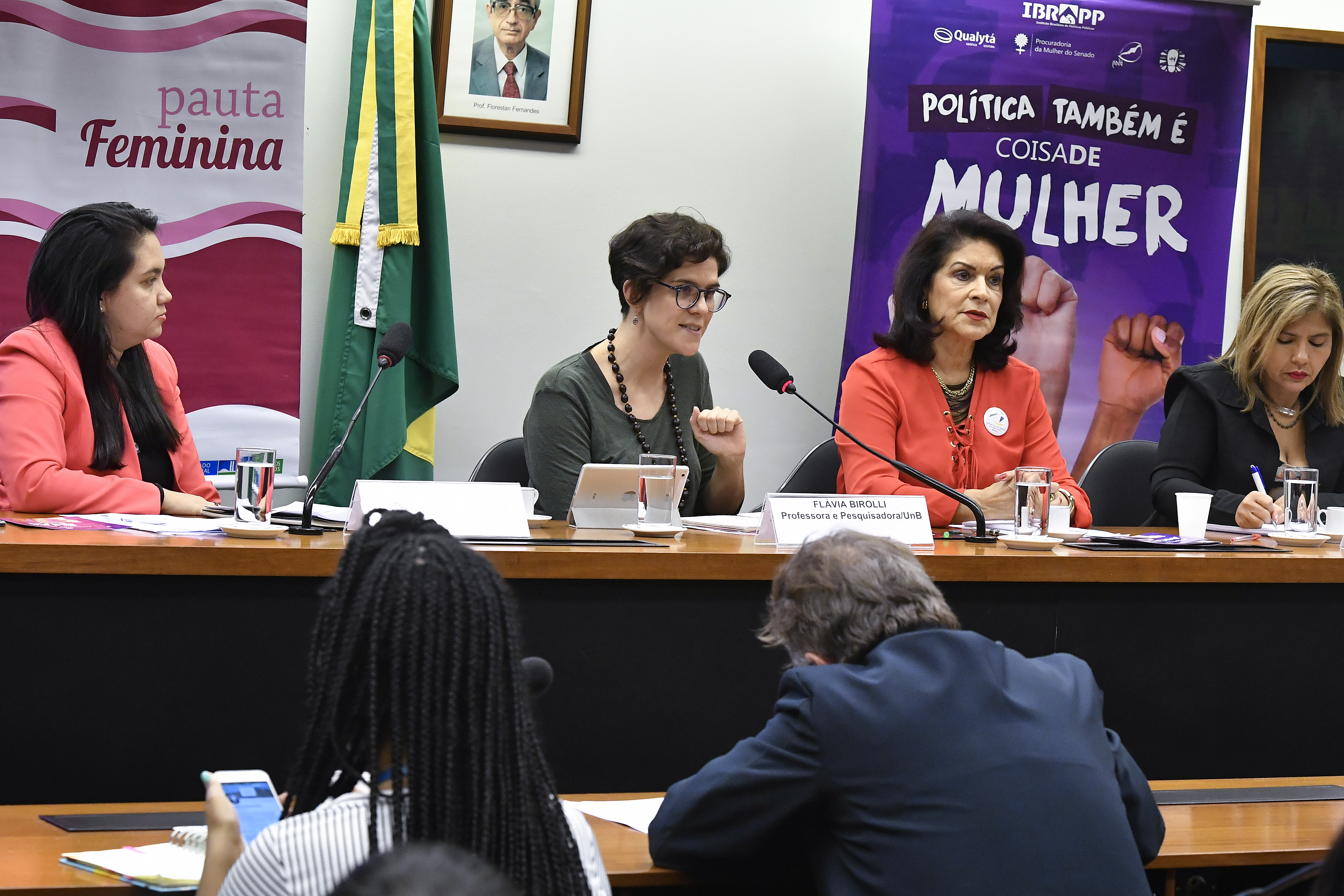
Celebrating 12 years of Lei Maria da Penha: Prof. Noëlle Silva, Biroli (Mercosur Women's Forum), Emília Fernandes (Brazilian Women's Union) and Vanja Andrea Reis dos Santos

Biroli has been heavily involved in political science organizations in Brazil. She has been a coordinator of the Gender, Democracy, and Public Policy section of the Brazilian Political Science Association, as well as a member of the board of directors of Brazil's National Association of Graduate Studies and Research in Social Sciences. In 2018 she was the President of the President of the Mercosur Women's Forum and she became the president of the Brazilian Political Science Association, with her term lasting until 2020.

Biroli also manages the Research on Democracy and Inequality Group at the University of Brasília, led by fellow political scientist Luis Felipe Miguel. She has also played a role in the Advisory Committee for the UN Women group in Brazil.

Biroli was the co-editor of the Brazilian Journal of Political Science from 2009 to 2016.

== Selected works ==
- Caleidoscópio convexo: mulheres, mídia e política, with Luis Felipe Miguel (pt), (2011)
- Autonomia e desigualdades de gênero: contribuições do feminismo para a crítica democrática (2013)
- Família: novos conceitos (2014)
- Feminismo e Política, with Luis Felipe Miguel (2015)
