= Women's rights in Brazil =

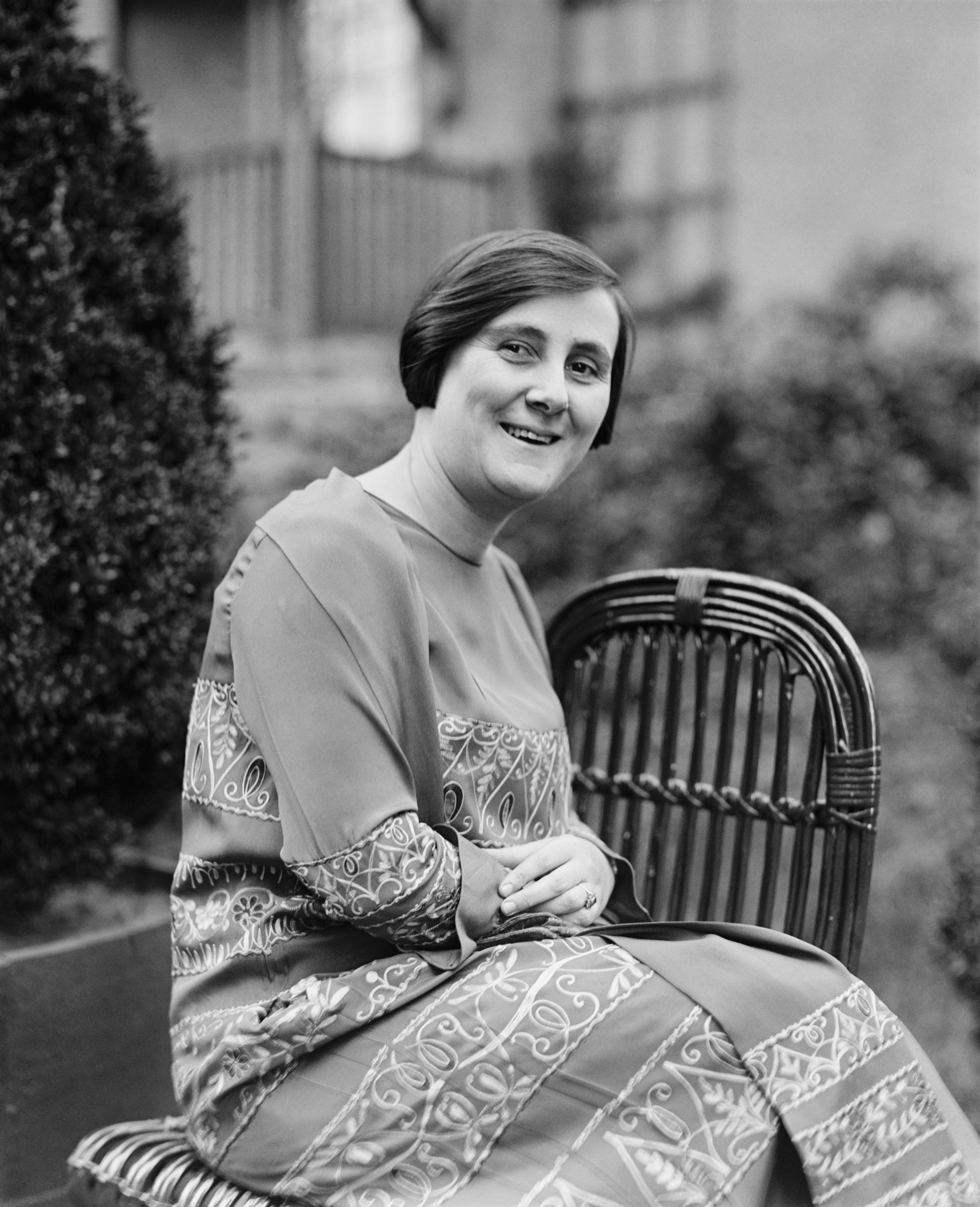
- Bertha Lutz in 1925, a leading figure of the feminist movement in Brazil

General statistics
- Maternal mortality (per 100,000): 54.5
- Women in parliament: 19.6% (2026)
- Women over 25 with secondary education: 66.6% (2022)
- Women in labour force: 53.3% (2022)

Gender Inequality Index
- Value: 0.390 (2022)
- Rank: 70th out of 165

Global Gender Gap Index
- Value: 0.726 (2023)
- Rank: 57th out of 146

Women's societal roles in Brazil have been heavily impacted by the patriarchal traditions of Iberian culture, which holds women subordinate to men in familial and community relationships. The Iberian Peninsula, which is made up of Spain, Portugal and Andorra, has traditionally been the cultural and military frontier between Christianity and Islam, developing a strong tradition for military conquest and male dominance. Patriarchal traditions were readily transferred from the Iberian Peninsula to Latin America through the encomienda system that fostered economic dependence among women and indigenous peoples in Brazil. As the largest Roman Catholic nation in the world, religion has also had a significant impact on the perception of women in Brazil, though over the past century the Brazilian government has increasingly broken with the Catholic Church in regard to issues related to reproductive rights.

Brazil is considered to possess the most organized and effective women's movement in Latin America, with visible gains having been made over the past century to promote and protect the legal and political rights of women. Despite the gains made in women's rights over the past century, women in Brazil still face significant gender inequality, which is most pronounced in the rural areas of Northeastern Brazil. In 2010, the United Nations ranked Brazil 73rd out of 169 nations based on the Gender Inequality Index, which measure women's disadvantages in the areas of reproductive rights, empowerment and labour force participation.

Women's movements in Brazil have traditionally been led and supported by upper middle class women, and tend to be reformist rather than revolutionary in nature, though clear exceptions exist, most notably with regard to agrarian land reform movements. Though suffrage was granted to women in Brazil in the 1930s, it was not until the 1970s and onwards that a broader, more potent women's movement took hold in Brazil. In 1979, the year of its publishing, Brazil signed and ratified CEDAW, a convention by the United Nations that aims to eliminate all forms of discrimination against women. Women in Brazil enjoy the same legal rights and duties as men, which is clearly expressed in the 5th article of Brazil's 1988 Constitution.

The World Economic Forum released a study indicating that Brazil had virtually eradicated gender differences in education and health treatment, but that women lagged behind in salaries and political influence. According to the Labor and Employment Ministry, women were paid 30 percent less than men. In 2005, UN Special Rapporteur Despouy noted a strikingly low level of women's representation in the judicial system, where women occupied "only 5 percent of the top posts in the judiciary and the Public Prosecutor's Office." Many women have been elected mayors and many women have been federal judges. The first female assumed office in the Senate in 1979. Women became candidates for president for the first time in 1989. As of 2009, 9% of the seats in the national parliament were held by women.

== Suffrage movement ==
Women in Brazil were granted the right to vote in 1932. Though a feminist movement had existed in Brazil since the mid-nineteenth century and women did petition for suffrage to be included in the 1891 Republican Constitution, the drive towards enfranchisement only began in earnest under the leadership of feminist, biologist and lawyer, Bertha Lutz. Following the publication of an article in leading Brazilian newspaper Revista da Semana, which called upon women to prove their worthiness to men through their achievements and organize in order to demand the right to vote, various women's organizations appeared.

Lutz founded her own organization in conjunction with American suffragist Carrie Chapman Catt in 1922, the Brazilian Federation for the Advancement of Women, which would become the leading suffrage organization of Brazil and was affiliated with the International Women's Suffrage Alliance. Brazilian suffragettes were literate, professional women who made up only a small percentage of the female population in Brazil, the latter which remained largely illiterate. Hence, the campaign for suffrage was by no means a mass movement, and was decidedly moderate in nature. The conservative character of the suffrage movement provoked little resistance from government, and suffrage was declared by Getúlio Vargas in 1932 and later confirmed in the 1934 Constitution.

Two years after women's suffrage was declared in the 5th Constitution of Brazil, two women were elected to Congress, ten females were elected mayors and assemblywomen, and thirty women were made councilwomen in Brazil. Though government jobs had been available to women in the past, women had not held electoral positions until after suffrage was won and the number of women in government continued to grow throughout the twentieth century.

== Constitutional rights ==
=== 5th Constitution of 1934 ===
Appointed by the Provisional Government in 1933 to draft the first page of the new Constitution, Bertha Lutz included various provisions to promote equal rights between men and women. Not only were women granted the equal right to hold government office and earn equal pay for equal work, but also were given preference over men in all government jobs dealing with the home, motherhood, children, and working conditions for women. The preferential treatment afforded to women in regard to certain government positions was controversial at the time.

=== Citizens' Constitution of 1988 ===
The Citizens' Constitution declared women equal to men in all legal respects, explicitly stating in Article 5 of Title II that "men and women have equal rights and duties under the terms of this Constitution." The National Council on Women's Rights, formed in 1975, advocated successfully on behalf of including gender conscious legislation in the new constitution. At the suggestion of the Council, a clause was added to the document announcing that land distributed by agrarian reform could be assigned and titled "in the name of the man, woman, or both, independent of civil status."

This was the first time in Brazilian history that women could legally be named beneficiaries of agrarian reform measures. The 1988 constitution also declared for the first time that urban and rural women and men had the same rights to social security benefits. Despite the declaration of such rights, as of 2000, institutions had not been established to enable or enforce gender equality in land reform. Furthermore, the Constitution promised "....protection of the labour market for women through specific incentives, as provided by law", and established a minimum required maternity leave of one hundred and twenty days and the introduction of paternity leave.

== Economic rights ==
Export agriculture and largely feminized labor forces in Latin America has expanded significantly in the last three decades. Research has illustrated how farms in northeast Brazil purposefully construct gendered divisions of labor and how women often experience worse pay and conditions than men.

According to The World Bank, 42% of people employed in the non-agricultural sector were women.

The law provides 120 days of paid maternity leave to women and seven days to men. The law also prohibits employers from requiring applicants or employees to take pregnancy tests or present sterilization certificates, but some employers sought sterilization certificates from female job applicants or tried to avoid hiring women of childbearing age. Violations of the law are punishable by jail terms for employers of up to two years, while the company may be fined 10 times the salary of its highest-paid employee.

Sexual harassment is a criminal offense, punishable by up to two years in jail. The law encompasses sexual advances in the workplace or in educational institutions and between service providers or clients. In the workplace it applies only in hierarchical situations, where the harasser is of higher rank or position than the victim. Although the legislation exists and was enforced, accusations remained rare, and the extent of the problem was not documented.

=== Property rights ===
Though women possess significant property rights under the current Brazilian Constitution, de facto inheritance and land reform regimes undermine women's ability to acquire and retain property in Brazil. Under the Civil Code of Brazil, married women could not lawfully acquire or possess their own property until 1962. The inheritance law differs based on matrimonial regimes, of which there are four: Partial Property Ruling (Comunhão Parcial), Community Property Ruling (Comunhão de Bens), Separate Property Ruling (Separação de Bens), Final Partition of Acquisitions (Participação Final dos Aquestos). These were unfavorable to women, although they have been reformed in the 21st century. The regimes have been criticized as positioning widows as mere custodians of property for children, rather than legitimate property owners. Indeed, studies show that a woman's ability to exercise her right to inherited property is largely influenced by whether she is viewed as a potential agriculturalist. Women are often denied access to inherited property because they do not inherit from their fathers and are not recognized as worthy heads of productive units. Though consensual unions were recognized by the 1988 Constitution, women in consensual unions were not endowed with the same inheritance rights as married women until 1994. With the return to civilian rule in 1985, President José Sarney made the more equitable distribution of land one of his attested objectives, issuing a directive to the Ministry of Agrarian Reform and Land Development in 1986 urging that beneficiaries of land be chosen "independently of sex." In conjunction with the democratic opening of the 1980s, a rural women's movement emerged with calls for inclusion of women in rural unions and guarantee of social security benefits, such as paid maternity leave and retirement pensions, for rural women. The National Confederation of Agricultural Workers (CONTAG), which is the largest organization of agricultural workers in Brazil, tackled women's rights for the first time during its fourth congress in 1985, when it decided to extend membership to more women and actively work to end gender discrimination. Demands for more equitable agrarian property rights, championed by organizations such as the Central Workers' Union, the Ministry of Agriculture, the National Women's Council led to agrarian reform measures in the 1988 Constitution. Grievances regarding equal land distribution in Brazil continued, evident in the Marcha da Margaridas of 2000, in which over fifteen thousand women marched on the capital to demand joint allocation of land to couples, rather than just men. The 2003 Civil Code improved women's rights, providing for gender equality in the acquisition, management, and administration of property brought into the union or acquired after marriage. However customary rules continue to be applied in practice, especially in rural areas, undermining women's property rights.

=== Employment and contracts ===
Though large segments of the female population remained illiterate through the turn of the century, a growing number of middle-class women began to pursue higher education and work outside of the home. Many early female workers found employment in schools, government and commercial offices. The formation of the Union of Professional Women in the 1920s, which embraced university and professional women, played a large role in the suffrage movement. By 1936, over a million Brazilian women worked outside the home, which led to changing perceptions of women's family roles and a remodeling of the nation's commercial usages.

Despite the growing number of women in the workforce, women's employment remained highly segregated based on perceptions of appropriate work for women. Up until the 1950s, domestic service was the largest category of female employment, with most other women engaged in government bureaucracy, social services, as well as other informal labor. Women's labor rights were not fully addressed until 1978, with the passage of a law declaring that women be paid equally for equal work, which was confirmed in the 1988 Constitution.

Working-class women began to organize on behalf of women's issues in the 1970s. Working-class women's organizations, such as the Housewives' Association of São Paulo and the Mothers' Club of São Paulo, became increasingly important arenas for women to express grievances with regard to informal care work and the cost of urban living. Women's involvement and leadership among unions have been less successful, as is the case in other Latin American countries. The first Congress of Female Metalworkers of São Paulo, held in 1978, was harassed and threatened by employers to the extent that only 300 of the 800 women who had signed up actually attended to conference.

Current female participation in the Brazilian labor market is 65 percent for women compared to 85 percent for men. Domestic workers have become increasingly organized through global professional networks and trade unions, though domestic labor remains a significant, and vastly under-regulated, form of work for women.

=== Prostitution and sex workers' rights ===
Though the exchange of money for sex is legal in Brazil, it is illegal to operate a brothel or employ prostitutes and such offenses are punishable by up to five years in jail. Prostitution is not considered a profession and hence sex workers do not have labor rights. Fernando Gabeira, founder of the Green Party, recently introduced a piece of legislation to Congress to establish prostitution as a recognized profession, however the bill was defeated in 2007. The Center for the Study of Prostitution (NEP), which is supported by the United States Agency for International Development (USAID) and Brazil's National Network of Sex Professionals, continues to advocate on behalf of the recognition of prostitution as a profession under standard labor and social security laws. These organizations have played a significant role in public health initiatives aimed at preventing and treating HIV/AIDS. Carmen Lucia Paz, a former prostitute and researcher at NEP, has become one of the most vocal champions of sex worker rights in Brazil.

== Education ==
As far as education is concerned, the literacy rate for women is similar to that of men. The literacy rate (defined as 15 years of age or older with the ability to read and write) was estimated in 2010 as 90.7% female and 90.1% male.

Women already represent more than a majority in many of the college courses. In the areas of Health and Human Sciences, they account for 66% and 71% of all students, respectively. As a whole, 53% of all Brazilians who are in universities are women. The progress in education for women started some decades ago. Since the 1930s women have had a higher number of years in school, on average, than men when it refers to the lower levels of scholarity. Since the 1970s, they surpassed men in the higher levels.

Until the mid-to-late nineteenth century, education for girls focused on domestic skills. In 1879, Brazilian institutions of higher learning admitted upper-class, mostly urban, white women- while the rest of the female population remained illiterate. Currently the literacy rates between men and women are relatively proportionate to the population and the level of education of women is now greater than that of men.

In 1970, there were approximately 19,000 women professionals in Brazil, including engineers, architects, dentists, economists, professors, lawyers, and doctors. By 1980, there were about 95,800 women in these fields.

At both the undergraduate and graduate levels, psychology, literature, and arts classes are composed almost entirely of women, in contrast to agriculture and national defense courses, in which extremely low numbers of women are enrolled.

== Family ==
=== Marriage ===
The legal minimum age for marriage without parents assistance is 18 for both women and men. The average age at first marriage is 22.6 years for women and 25.3 years for men.

In the past, under Brazil's civil code, the husband was the legal head of the family, with complete authority over children and family decisions. Nowadays things are different, in the first article of Civil Code Article of 2002 the new direction is demonstrated by the replacement of the expression "everyman" for "everyone". The legislature recognized that civil now a consensus that both, man and woman shall enjoy the same privileges and responsibilities towards the society, therefore, are equally responsible, or is obliged, in proportion to their property, and the support of the charges family and children's education.

They also have the option to add the surname of male to female or the female in the male. It is not mandatory. Through marriage, man and woman mutually assume the condition spouses, among these duties are loyalty, which is maintaining monogamous relationship, mutual fidelity, living together in the marital home; mutual assistance; support, custody and education of children; mutual respect and consideration.

=== Divorce ===
Divorce became legal in Brazil in 1977, with the law permitting each person only one divorce in a lifetime and only after a three -year legal or five-year de facto separation. This condition was lifted in 1988.

== Religion and spirituality ==
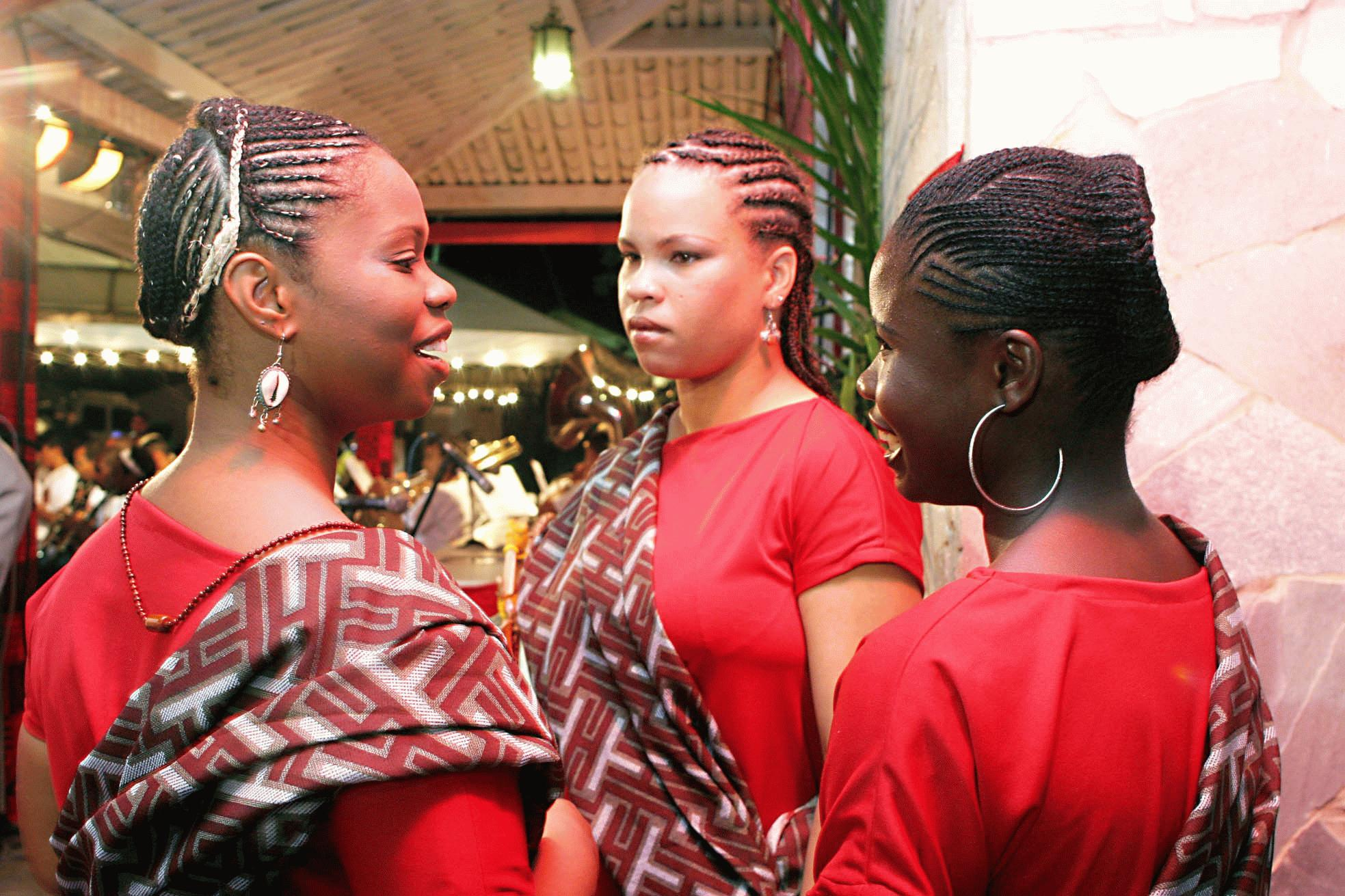
Women during a Candomblé ceremony in Bahia.

Women have been suppressed and excluded from participation in public activity in Roman Catholic institutions in Brazil. It has been a history of limitations, but with an exception: women, particularly those of indisputable African lineage, have dominated the syncretistic Afro-Brazilian religious groups.

There are Afro-Brazilian religions that combine elements of African tribal religions, Amerindian religions, Catholicism, and Kardecism (French Spiritism) that are women centered. The main features include curing and public rituals in which female mediums are possessed by spirits. These religions coexist with Catholicism.

== Reproductive rights ==
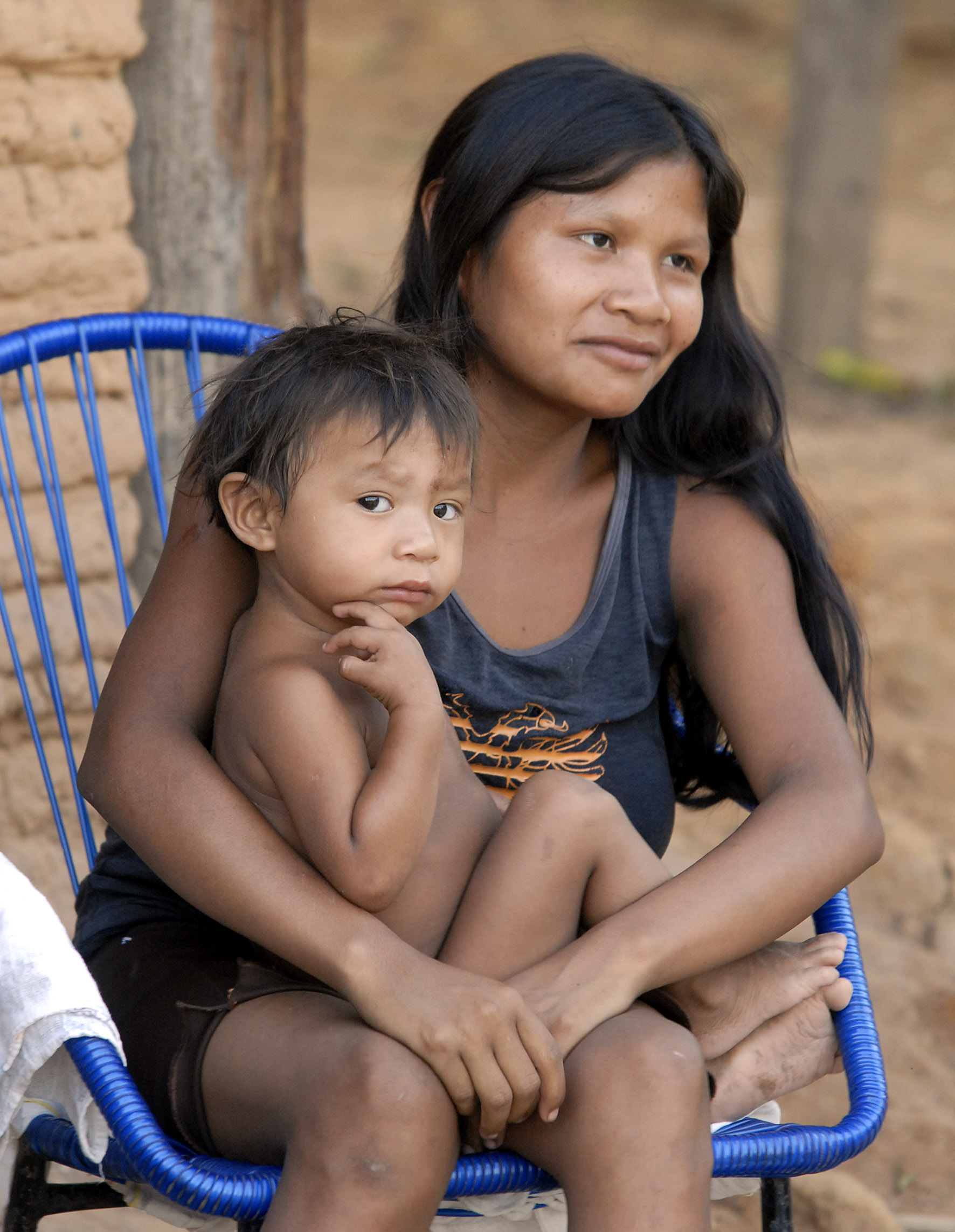
Guajajara mother with child in Maranhão

Reproductive rights are a critical issue in Brazil. Major health problems have been caused by back-street abortions and attempts to make sterilization the main form of contraception for women.

The oldest and largest foreign-funded private organization with a population control program is the Family Welfare in Brazil (BEMFAM), which is funded by the International Planned Parenthood Federation.

While adult prostitution is legal, various associated activities, such as operating a brothel, are illegal. While no specific laws address sex tourism, it is punishable under other criminal offenses, such as pedophilia and corruption of minors. The government released a "code of conduct to combat sex tourism and sexual exploitation" and conducted campaigns in the most affected areas. The states of Pernambuco, Espírito Santo, Amazonas and Paraná and the Federal District enacted laws requiring certain businesses to display signs listing the penalties for having intercourse with a minor. Rio de Janeiro and Bahia states had previously enacted similar legislation.

Women's groups reported that prostitutes encountered discrimination when seeking free medical care. Trafficking of women for the purpose of prostitution is a serious problem, and it is known that international criminal groups and mafias are involved in this activity.

=== Contraception ===
Until the legalization of contraceptives in the early twentieth century, Brazilian law placed contraception, abortion and immorality in the same classification. Three factors that have impacted contraceptive laws on Brazil are the influence of the Catholic Church, the legacy of Iberian culture, and the historically conservative approach to the status of women in Latin America. Bem-Estar Familiar no Brasil (BEMFAM), which is funded by the International Planned Parenthood Federation, is the leading NGO in the country dedicated to family planning.

A laissez-faire attitude adopted on the part of the Brazilian government in the 1960s has led to the predominance of private organizations in the provision of family planning services. The government has taken measure to extend planning to poorer Brazilians by subsidizing birth control pills and sterilization at government clinics. The current birth rate in Brazil is at a replacement rate of about 2.18 births per woman estimated for the year 2011.

Brazil has witnessed one of the most dramatic reductions in family size in modern history in part due to increased access to family planning services. Indeed, the fertility rate in Brazil has steadily decreased over the past four decades due in some measure to the growing use of contraceptives, sterilization and abortion.

=== Sterilization ===
Sterilization has become increasingly popular in Brazil since it became legal and free for women over 25 in 1996, and is regulated by the Health Ministry. It had already been a popular practice among poor communities before the legalization of sterilization, and was practiced in private clinics. In 1994, over sixty percent of women in Goiás, and over seventy percent of women in Maranhão and Mato Grosso were sterilized. After the 1996 law, sterilization became part of the population control policy of the Brazilian government. Though some view sterilization as an inexpensive form of birth control and a useful tool in population control, others see the mass use of sterilization in Brazil as contrary to promoting women's choices in contraceptive use. Sterilization is most common among Afro-Brazilians in the Northeast of the country who are too poor to afford other types of contraception and uneducated on the long term consequences of sterilization. Scholars such as Andre Caetano and Joseph E. Potter claim that sterilization has been used as a political means of garnering votes while controlling population growth among poor, minority populations.

The prevalence of female sterilization in Brazil is among the highest in the world. The most widely used method of contraception in 1996, relied on by 40% of women in union, was female sterilization. This single method was responsible for more than half (52%) of all contraceptive use in Brazil. The only other method used by a considerable proportion of women was the pill (21%).

According to a 1996 study, "sterilized women who were young at the time they had the surgery and those who had limited knowledge of sterilization and other contraceptive options are more likely than other women to seek a reversal of the procedure." A 2003 study in Campinas concluded that "in order to reduce the number of young women who choose surgical sterilization over equally effective, but reversible methods, it is necessary to act early in life."

=== Abortion ===
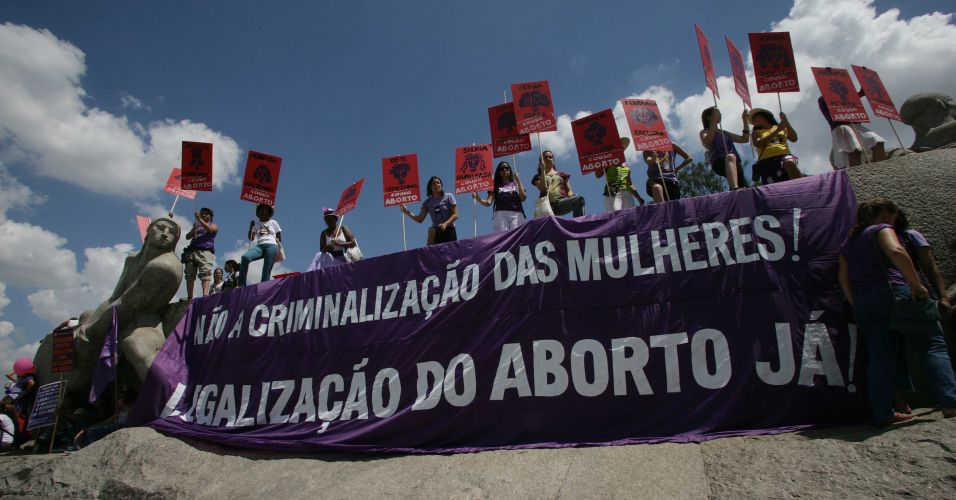
Pro-choice feminists protesting in São Paulo on International Women's Day, March 8, 2009

Abortion is illegal in Brazil except for the case of rape, when the mother's life is in danger or in cases of fetuses with anencephaly which was recently adapted in 2012. Though abortions are against the law, it is estimated that over one million abortions are performed in Brazil each year, though data on abortion incidence is not systemically collected. Over two hundred thousand women are treated for abortion complications each year in Brazilian hospitals. The punishment for a woman performing an abortion on herself or consenting to an abortion is one to three years of imprisonment. The punishment for those performing abortions is one to four years of imprisonment, and this number increases by one-third if harm is caused to the women or one-half if the abortion leads to the death of the woman.

Feminist movement activists go on the streets since June 4, 2011 to protest against the law that makes abortion illegal. The protest is called "Marcha Das Vadias" which was inspired by the Canadian protest that took place in Toronto, Canada two months prior with the same intents.

The new President Jair Bolsonaro elected on October 28, 2018, chose the pastor Damares Alves as the Minister of Women, Family and Human's Rights of Brazil. Alves claims the new government wishes a Brazil a "country without abortions" but the previous exceptions will not be changed.

In early August 2020, a 10-year-old girl discovered that she was pregnant after being repeatedly raped for 4 years by her uncle. The pregnancy's threat to her life led the girl's parents to decide upon aborting the child. According to Brazilian law, abortion is legal, in cases of rape & when the mother's life is in danger However, taking court's permission beforehand is necessary. The anti-abortion activist published the girl's name and hospital's name which agreed to do the abortion. The protestors then blocked the hospital from being accessed and harassed the hospital staff. However, the girl finally succeeded in reaching the hospital, hiding in a truck and got the abortion performed on 17 August 2020.

== Rape and sexual violence ==
=== Sexual harassment ===
Views on sexual harassment in Brazil have been influenced by both culture and sexual harassment laws, making for a disconnect between official regulations and general attitudes. Researcher Rebecca Merkin found that unlike their American counterparts, Brazilian women do not express decreased job satisfaction when faced with sexual harassment, illuminating the greater acceptability of sexual harassment in Brazil as compared to the United States.

Following the passage of the 1988 Constitution, a law was passed in 1991 outlawing sexual harassment and making it a crime punishable by a fine of up to $20,000. In 2001, a contentious law was passed under the civil code raising the punishment for sexual harassment to one to two years of jail time. Despite the presence of strict regulations, Brazil has one of the worst reputations in the world in terms of the harassment of women in the workplace and in the home. Fiedler and Blanco assert that men rarely follow sexual harassment laws, and that few sexual harassment cases have been brought to trial in Brazil.

In 2015 Brazil was stated as the sixth most violent country when the subject is rape. It is only behind El Salvador, Honduras, Venezuela, Jamaica, Trinidad and Tobago.

=== Age of consent and statutory rape ===
The age of consent in Brazil is 14, regardless of gender or sexual orientation and any type of sexual activity is permitted after the age of 18. Statutory rape can only be committed by those above the age of 18, and is punishable by 8 to 15 years imprisonment. However, according to US State Department, men who have killed, sexually assaulted, or committed other crimes against women are unlikely to be brought to trial. Brazil has recently overtaken Thailand as the world's most popular destination for sex tourism, which involves travel for the purpose of engaging in sexual activity with prostitutes.

Sex tourism is most common in the Northeast of Brazil, especially in the city of Fortaleza, where child prostitution is rampant. While no specific laws address sex tourism, it is punishable under other criminal offenses, such as pedophilia and corruption of minors. The government released a "code of conduct to combat sex tourism and sexual exploitation" and conducted campaigns in the most affected areas, which are predominantly in the Northeastern region of the country. The states of Pernambuco, Espírito Santo, Amazonas, Paraná and the Federal District enacted laws requiring certain businesses to display signs listing the penalties for having intercourse with a minor.

=== Domestic violence ===
Between 10 and 15 women are murdered per day in Brazil. A government sponsored study found that 41,532 women were murdered in Brazil between 1997 and 2007.

Domestic violence was not a part of the Brazilian criminal code until 2006, when the federal criminal domestic violence code was passed by President Lula. The Law of Domestic and Family Violence was the first official codification of domestic violence crimes, and tripled the previous punishments associated with domestic violence. Brazil's adoption of the domestic violence code was mainly influenced by its participation in the Convention on the Elimination of All Forms of Discrimination against Women (CEDAW), the urging of the international legal community, and the tenacity of local grassroots movements. The formation of women's police units and a federally funded hotline to serve victims of gender violence have significantly advanced the protections offered to women in Brazil, though domestic violence in Brazil remains prevalent and thus a major obstacle in attaining equal rights for women. In 2015, Brazil enacted a law against femicide.

== Sports ==
It was illegal for women to play football in Brazil from 1941 to 1979.

== Racial differences ==
There are serious and controversial issues about differences in the situation of women with different races and ethnicities in Brazil. As a whole, black and Amerindian women enjoy considerably less quality of life than white women, with this being a reflection of the general characteristics of the social and economic gap that has separated social classes in Brazil for centuries, thus not indicating any specific problem about gender and women's rights. Black women's life expectancy in 2004 was 69.52 years, while white women could expect to live 73.80 on average. However, there is, at least apparently, no legal or institutional circumstance that generates those ethnic differences, but lower standards of life have always been related to a much larger percentage of mulatto, black and Amerindian people in Brazil, as in many other countries. In the last years, there is a tendency of soft decrease in Brazil's racial inequality.

== Human rights ==
The human rights movement has had a significant impact on the women's rights movement since the 1970s, when the human rights emerged as an ideology and practice of development. Hence, the women's movement in Brazil has often been understood in the larger context of a push towards greater political participation and socioeconomic equality. Since the explosion of human rights, women's movements in Brazil have become more connected with broader political issues, and have been articulated within the context of more general social issues related to democratization and socioeconomic inequality. Most of those women involved in the feminist movement of the 1970s were also involved in other political movements, such as the human rights movement, and the formation of leftist political parties.

The Amnesty International movement was one that gained much support from feminists, evident in the establishment of the Feminine Movement for Amnesty of the 1970s. At the same time, feminist movements have attempted to maintain balance between their specific goals and wider political demands. Despite the influence of the human rights movement upon women's movements in Brazil, women's rights were not internationally recognized as human rights until the 1993 World Conference on Human Rights, held by the United Nations in Vienna.

== Key activists and organizations ==
- Nísia Floresta
- Bertha Lutz
- Brazilian Federation for the Advancement of Women
- Carmen Lucía Paz
- National Council on Women
- Feminine Movement for Amnesty
- Center for the Development of Brazilian Women
- Union of Professional Women
- Brazilian Women's Center
- Family Welfare in Brazil (BEM-FAM)
- National Confederation of Agricultural Workers (CONTAG)
- Center for the Study of Prostitution (NEP)
- Brazil's National Network of Sex Professionals

== See also ==
- Feminism in Brazil
- Ele Não movement – 2018 demonstrations against Jair Bolsonaro's presidential campaign
- Brazilian Congressional Bill No. 896 – Draft bill to criminalize misogyny.
