= Maria da Penha Law =

Brazilian law against domestic violence

Lei Maria da Penha
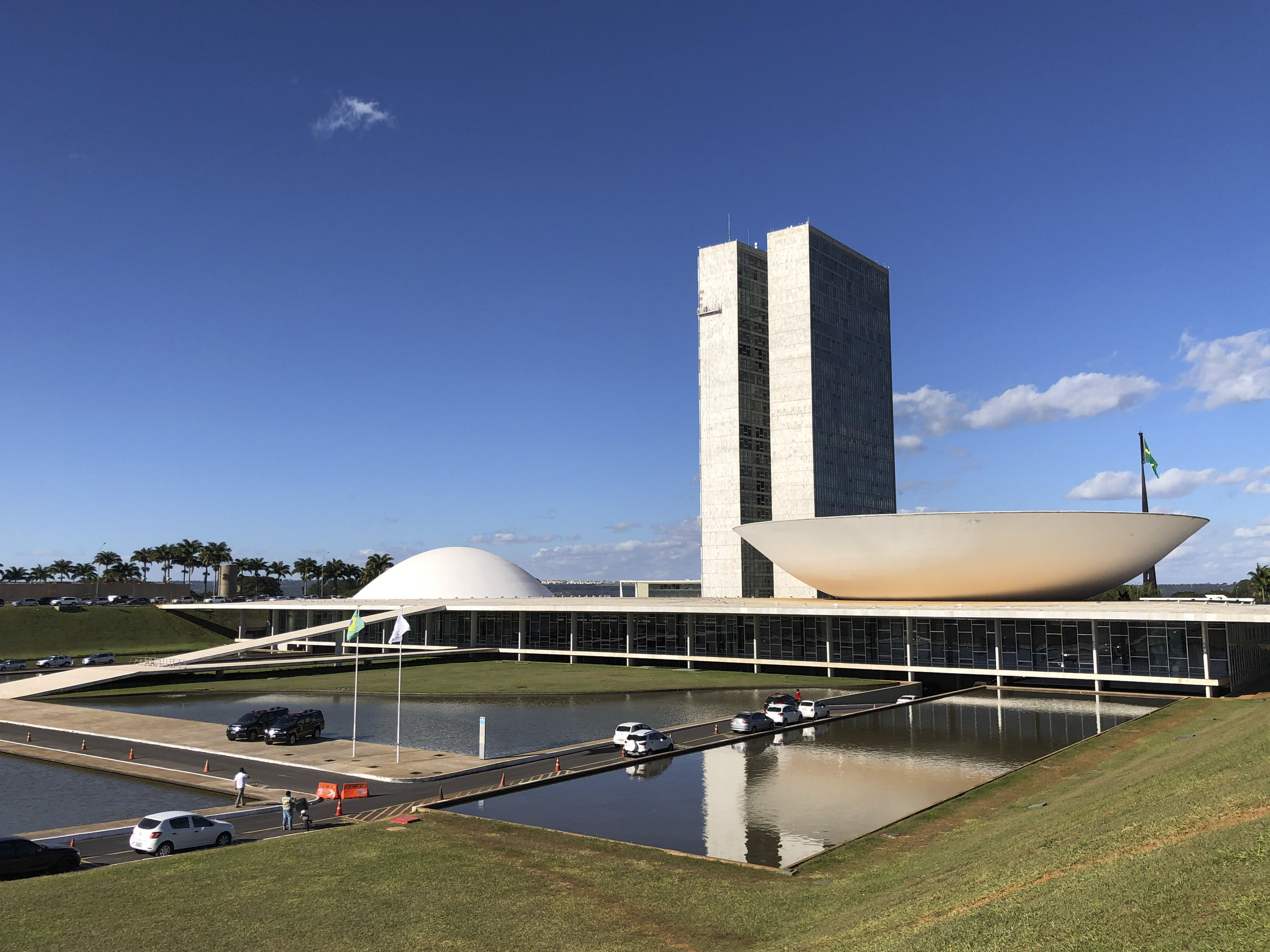

National Congress of Brazil
- Long title: Law No. 11,340 of 7 August 2006
- Citation: PL 4559/2004
- Territorial extent: Whole of Brazil
- Passed by: Chamber of Deputies
- Passed: 22 March 2006
- Passed by: Federal Senate
- Passed: 12 July 2006
- Signed by: President Luiz Inácio Lula da Silva
- Signed: 7 August 2006
- Commenced: 22 September 2006

Legislative history

Initiating chamber: Chamber of Deputies
- Bill title: Law Project 4559/2004
- Bill citation: PL 4559/2004
- Introduced by: Presidency of the Republic
- Introduced: 3 December 2004
- Committee responsible: Social Security and Family, Finances and Taxation
- First reading: 13 December 2004
- Second reading: 7 March 2006
- Passed: 22 March 2006

Revising chamber: Federal Senate
- Bill title: Chamber Law Project 37/2006
- Bill citation: PLC 37/2006
- Received from the Chamber of Deputies: 31 March 2006
- Member(s) in charge: Chamber of Deputies
- First reading: 3 April 2006
- Second reading: 11 July 2006
- Passed: 12 July 2006

Summary
- Creates mechanisms to curb domestic and family violence against women, pursuant to § 8 of art. 226 of the Federal Constitution, the Convention on the Elimination of All Forms of Discrimination against Women and the Inter-American Convention to Prevent, Punish and Eradicate Violence against Women; provides for the creation of Courts of Domestic and Family Violence against Women; amends the Criminal Procedure Code, the Penal Code and the Penal Execution Law; and takes other measures

Keywords
- Domestic violence, violence against women, women's rights
- Status: In force

The Lei Maria da Penha (Brazilian Portuguese: [ˈlej maˈɾi.ɐ dɐ ˈpẽɲɐ]; "Maria da Penha Law"), officially Law No. 11,340 of 7 August 2006, targets gender-based violence in Brazil, with the specific aim of reducing domestic violence in the country. Sanctioned on 7 August 2006 by president Luiz Inácio Lula da Silva and the Ministry of Women, and subsequently implemented on 22 September 2006, the law is an important contribution to an international movement of criminalizing violence against women. The law is named after Brazilian activist Maria da Penha Maia, who herself was a victim of domestic violence.

== Background ==
Violence against women, specifically domestic violence, remains a pervasive issue in Latin America. Domestic violence can be defined as, "physical, sexual, and verbal aggression…typical of sexism and a way to strengthen men's power within the household, especially if they feel economically insecure." According to the Fórum Brasileiro de Segurança Pública, 66% of Brazilian men have perpetrated violence against a woman in his community and 70% of Brazilian women identified as having experienced some form of violence in a public space before the age of 24. In early 2017, an in-depth examination of gender based violence in Brazil determined that only a quarter of women who experience violence by the hands of an intimate partner report incidents to the authorities. Despite strong statistical evidence supporting widespread violence against women in Brazilian households, few legal initiatives existed in Brazil to challenge this systematic violence against women. Until 2009, domestic abuse could be dismissed by the court if the woman was not deemed to be "honest."

In 2006, with intense media focus on the high-profile case of Maria da Penha, the Brazilian government created the Maria da Penha Law (named in da Penha's honor) in an attempted response to international criticism. Over the course of her 23-year marriage, Maria da Penha was domestically abused by her husband, resulting in da Penha becoming paraplegic after two murder attempts. Following these events, da Penha, along with the Center for Justice for International Law (CEJIL) and the Latin American Committee for the Defense of Women's Rights (CLADEM), spent the next twenty years fighting her husband through the Brazilian legal system; da Penha filed a complaint with the Inter-American Commission on Human Rights, emphasizing the need for the state to intervene in combating gender based violence in the country.

== Components of the law ==
The Maria da Penha law aims to reduce domestic violence mainly by increasing punishment for domestic abuse offenders, increasing the maximum detention time from one to three years, establishing domestic violence courts and requiring Brazilian authorities to institute 24 hour shelters for victims of household domestic abuse. The law specifically states that domestic violence between same-sex partners and domestic abuse perpetrated by woman towards a man in a heterosexual relationship also constitute punishable crime. Additionally, the law provides protective measures to the victim, empowering judges to issue temporary restraining orders.

In February 2012, the Supreme Court upheld the constitutionality of the Maria da Penha law, ruling that prosecutors "may bring domestic violence cases regardless of whether the victim presses charges or not."

On 6 April 2022, the Superior Court of Justice ruled that the Maria da Penha Law also applies to trans women.

On 19 August 2026, the Supreme Court ruled unanimously that the law also applies to cases of gender-based violence where there is no domestic, romantic, or familial bond between the victim and the abuser.

== Implementation ==
=== Supportive response ===
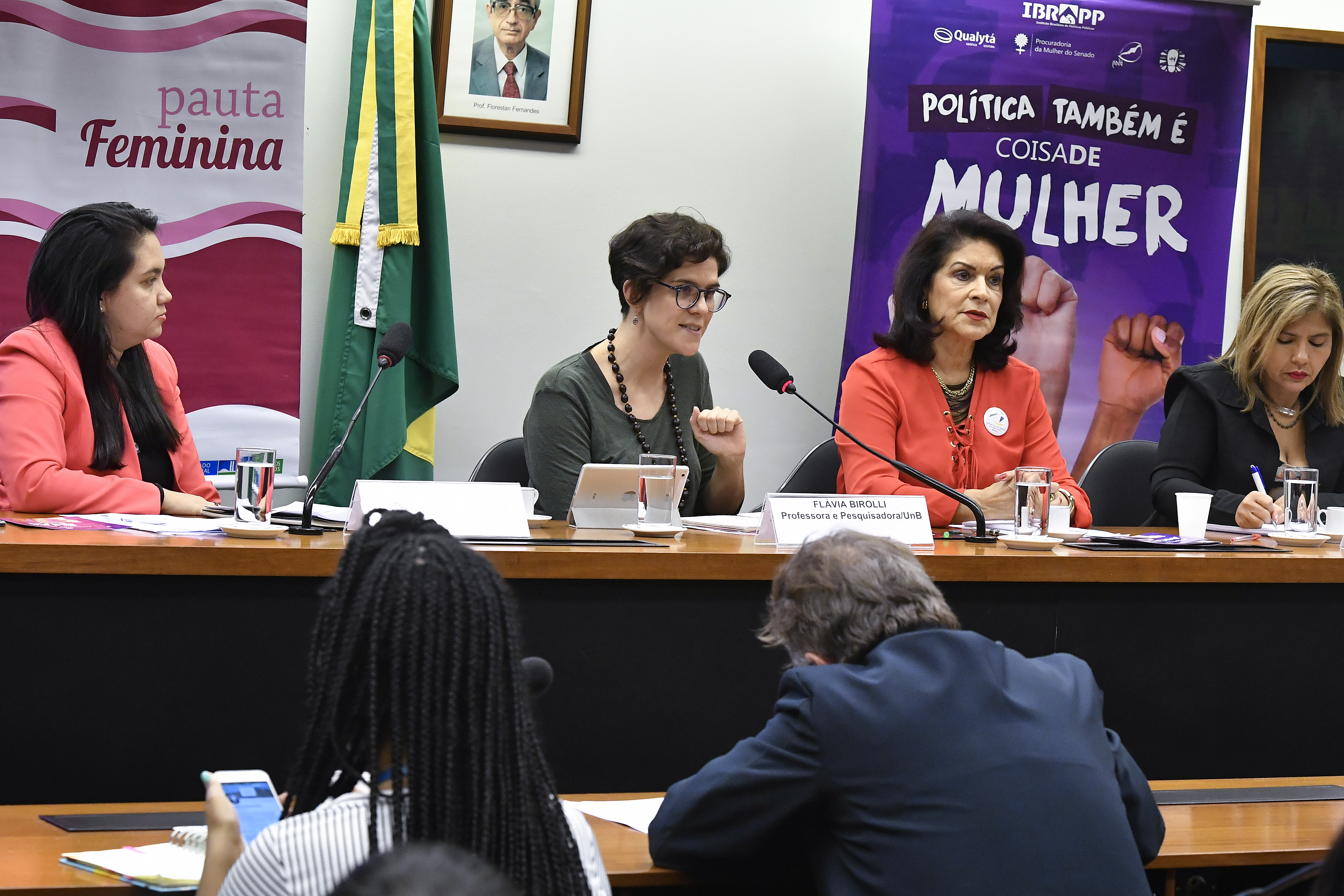
Celebrating 12 years of Lei Maria da Penha in 2018: Prof. Noëlle Silva, Prof. Flávia Biroli (Mercosur Women's Forum), Emília Fernandes (Brazilian Women's Union) and Vanja Andrea Reis dos Santos

With the implementation of the Maria da Penha Law, Brazil arguably has one of the most progressive pieces of legislation addressing domestic violence in Latin America. According to the Institute of Applied Economic Research (Instituto de Pesquisa Econômica Aplicada), the Lei Maria da Penha has had a positive impact in reducing domestic violence against women in Brazil, with their study showing a 10% decrease in projected domestic homicides rates since 2006. While statistical evidence supports the positive impacts of the law in Brazil, many in Brazil still feel more must be done to address high levels of domestic violence in the country.

=== Critical response ===
Those critical of the effectiveness of the law point to failures in the law's implementation. Speaking to these concerns, Brazil director at Human Rights Watch, Maria Laura Canineu said, "The Maria da Penha law was a major step forward, but more than a decade later, implementation remains woefully inadequate throughout much of the country." More specifically, these shortcomings include the failure of police to follow procedure when a woman reports an incident of violence, the practice of demanding women undergo invasive medical procedures to prove abuse, the lack of a private space for the victim to share a testimony, and the failure to carry out protection orders against offenders. Additionally, political turmoil in Brazil has defunded many government programs protecting domestic violence victims, specifically women of color from low socio-economic classes who are already denied access to adequate health and legal services. This is also observed in limited access to the special units established by the law; most special units are located only in major Brazilian cities, isolating women in rural areas of the country and causing them to travel long distances for help. In addition to the logistical issues that remain, the culture of machismo in Brazil continues to stand as a major barrier for women seeking justice. "Crimes that occurred inside the house are, in general, consider less serious than those committed in the public sphere. The cultural acceptance of domestic violence aggravated this problem." da Penha herself has been outspoken and critical about the effectiveness of the law, stating, "The problem is not the law but in its application…"

== See also ==
- Domestic violence in Brazil
- Women's police stations
