= Paulo Paim =

Brazilian politician (born 1950)

Paulo Renato Paim

Senator for Rio Grande do Sul
- Incumbent
- Assumed office 1 February 2003
- Preceded by: José Fogaça

Federal Deputy for Rio Grande do Sul
- In office 1 February 1987 – 1 February 2003

Personal details
- Born: 15 March 1950 (age 76) Caxias do Sul, Rio Grande do Sul, Brazil
- Party: Workers' Party
- Spouse: Suzana Paim
- Profession: Metallurgical worker

Paulo Renato Paim (born 15 March 1950) is a Brazilian steelworker turned politician. He served as a federal deputy from Rio Grande do Sul for the Workers' Party (Partido dos Trabalhadores – PT) from 1987 to 2002. On 2002, he was elected Senator from the same state and re-elected in 2010. He also served as Vice-President of trade union center Central Única dos Trabalhadores (CUT) from 1984 to 1986.

== Early life ==
Paulo Renato Paim was born in Caxias do Sul, Rio Grande do Sul, on March 15, 1950. He became a trained steelworker after receiving a professional education degree from SENAI. Paim worked on Abramo Eberle and Forjasul metallurgical factories before becoming the president of the Canoas steelworkers trade union on 1981. Two years later, he became Secretary-General of the Central Única dos Trabalhadores, prior to becoming the Vice-President of that same organization on 1984.

== Political career ==
In 1985, Paim became a member of the Workers' Party (Partido dos Trabalhadores – PT) and, in the following year, became a federal deputy for the party. As a constituent deputy, he would engage in the writing of the current Constitution of Brazil however he and his party (Partido dos Trabalhadores – PT) did not sign nor approve that Constitution to this day. From 1989 to 1991, Paim was the deputy leader for the PT in the Chamber of Deputies. From 1993 to 1994, he was the head of the Chamber's Labour, Administration and Public Service committee. In 1997, he authored a bill which would be enacted by President Luiz Inácio Lula da Silva as the Elderly Statute, a set of laws which guarantees the rights of elderly people in Brazil. He became nationally known after the adoption of US$100 minimum wage, which he had proposed. Paim would later spark controversy, in 2001, after he ripped a copy of the Constitution as a protest to a bill seeking to change the Consolidation of Labor Laws.

In 2002, Paim was elected to the Federal Senate after a close race with fellow party member Emília Fernandes, the Senator for Rio Grande do Sul. From 2003 to 2005, he was Vice-President of the Senate. From 2007 to 2009, he was President of the upper house's Human Rights and Participative Legislation committee. In the Senate, Paim became known for defending higher pension checks for retired people. In 2010, Paim was re-elected Senator for Rio Grande do Sul with almost 34% of the valid votes. He received over 3.8 million votes; 479,000 more than Governor Tarso Genro, a fellow member of PT.
