= Emília Fernandes =

Brazilian politician

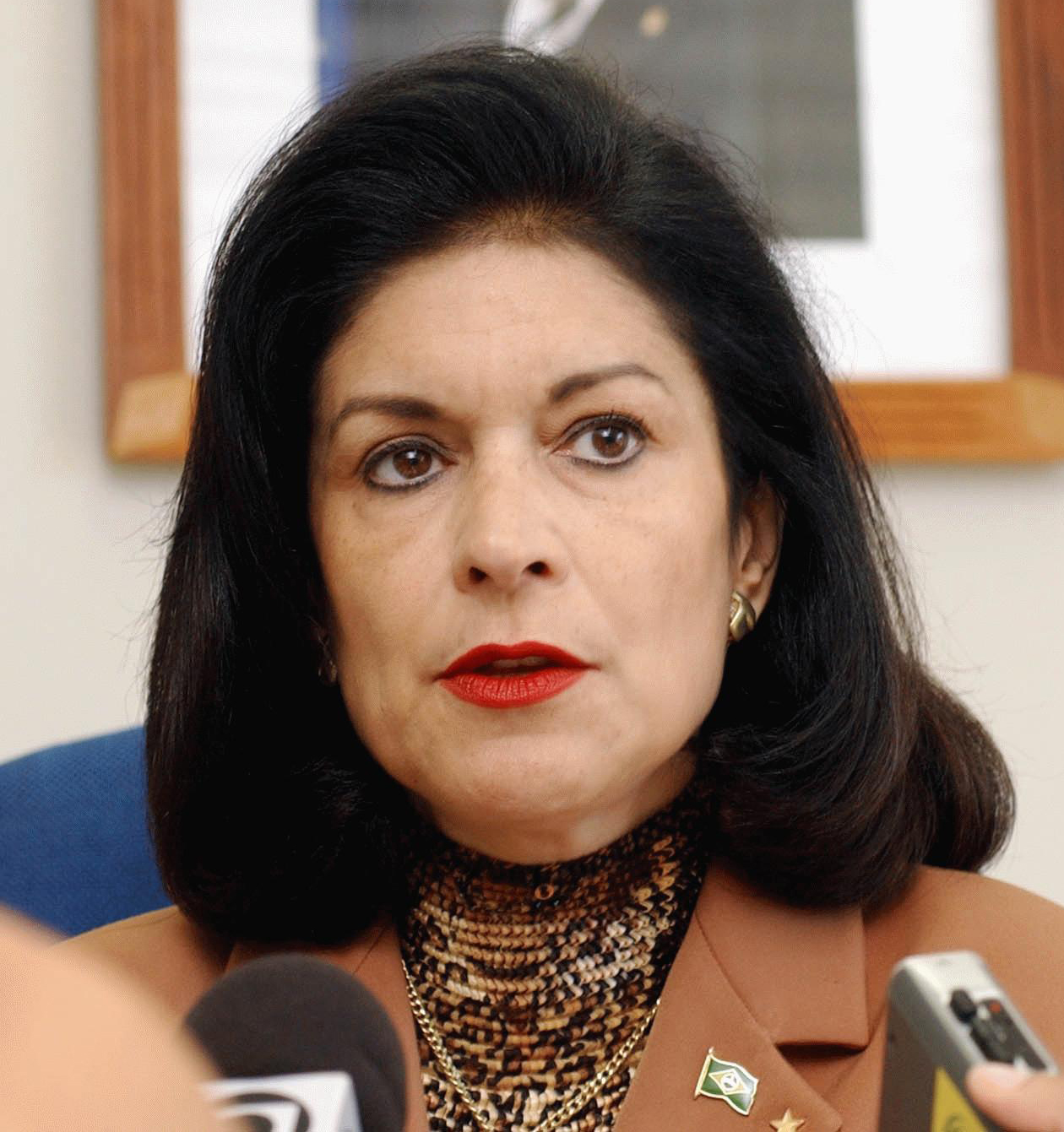
- Fernandes in 2003

Federal deputy for Rio Grande do Sul
- In office 17 February 2009 – 31 January 2011
- Succeeded by: Paulo Paim

Minister of the Special Secretariat of Policy for Women
- In office 1 January 2003 – 29 January 2004
- President: Luiz Inácio Lula da Silva
- Succeeded by: Nilcéa Freire

Senator for Rio Grande do Sul
- In office 1 February 1995 – 1 January 2003

Councilor of Santana do Livramento
- In office 1982–1994

Personal details
- Born: 18 July 1949 (age 77) Santana do Livramento, Rio Grande do Sul, Brazil
- Party: PCdoB (2013–present)
- Other political affiliations: PDT (1982–1992, 1996–1999); PTB (1992–1996); PT (1999–2013)
- Spouse: Carlos Alberto Tabará Fernandes (Husband)
- Children: 2
- Occupation: Teacher, trade unionist, politician

Emília Teresinha Xavier Fernandes (born 18 July 1949) is a Brazilian politician affiliated with the Communist Party of Brazil (PCdoB). She was a teacher for 23 years and trade unionist. She was the first woman to be elected senator in Rio Grande do Sul.

== Life and education ==
Fernandes was born in Santana do Livramento, Rio Grande do Sul, Brazil. She graduated from pedagogy in 1978 and completed a postgraduate degree in educational planning in 1981 from Universidade da Região da Campanha.

== Career ==
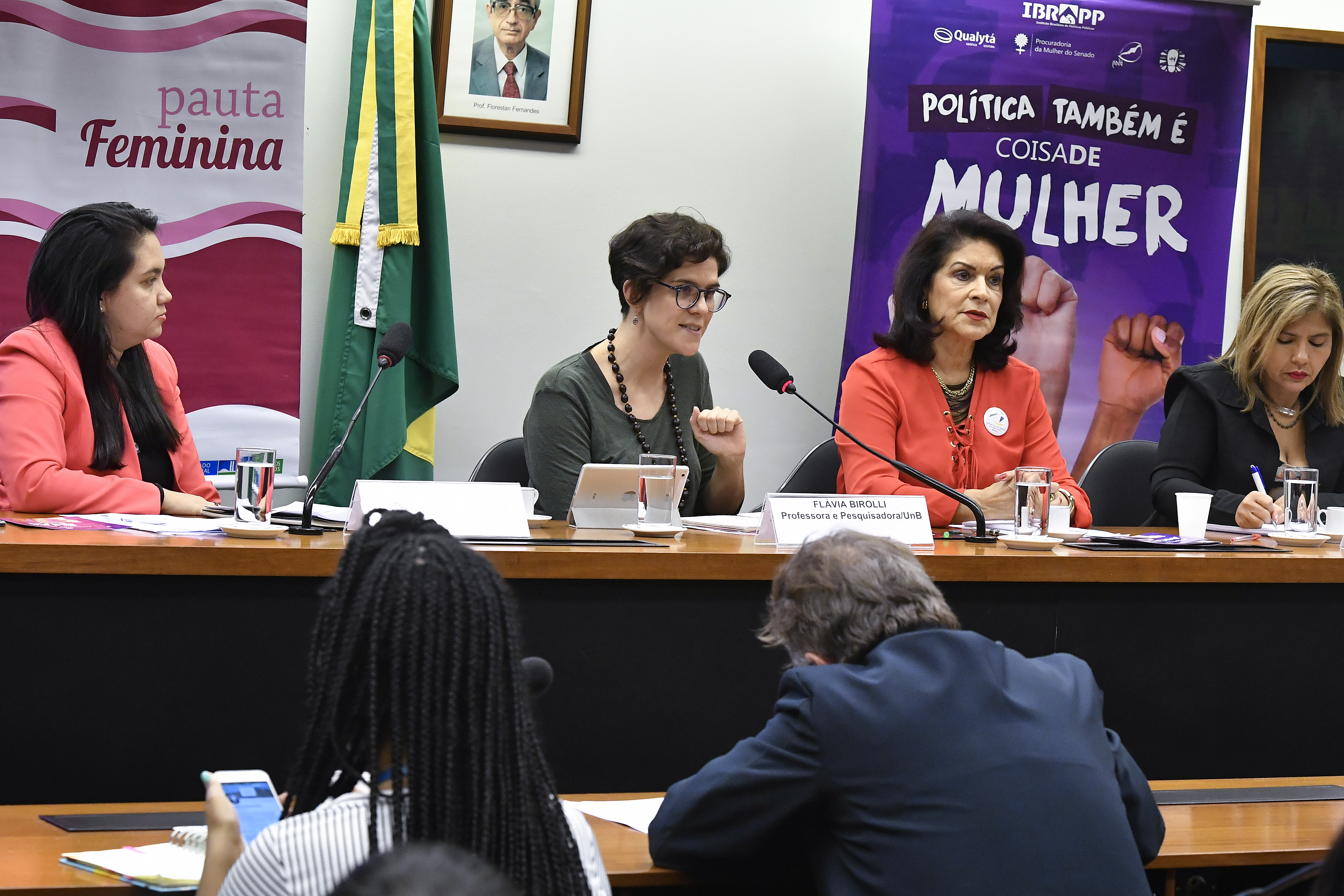
Celebrating 12 years of Lei Maria da Penha: Prof. Noëlle Silva, Flávia Biroli (Mercosur Women's Forum), Emília Fernandes (Brazilian Women's Union) and Vanja Andrea Reis dos Santos

Fernandes joined the state public service in 1972 as a teacher, four years later she became the director of the Moisés Viana State School till 1982. She was a teacher for 23 years. She began her political career contesting as councilor in her hometown in the Brazilian Labour Party (PTB). She won the councilorship election and was sworn in during February 1983. She was reelected as councilor in November 1988 and was sworn in during February 1989. She was elected as a senator of Rio Grande do Sul in the October 1994 election. She resigned as a councilor and took her seat in the senate in February 1995, becoming a member of the social affairs committee and vice president of the house's education commission. In 1996, she became a member of the senate's budget, education and foreign affairs commission. From December 1996 to July 1997, she served as a member of the Parliamentary Commission of Inquiry (CPI). In October 1998 election, she ran in the governorship election of Rio Grande do Sul through the coalition Frente Trabal Trabalhar Rio-Grandense and was defeated in the first round. In 1999, she became the head of the Radio and TV subcommittee (CESRTV) in the senate house and was also the first woman to chair a permanent commission of the federal senate. In 2000, she served as vice president of the Mixed Commission on Education. In 2002, she tried returning to the senate house, but lost to Paulo Paim from PT.

Fernandes tenure at the senate was expected to finish on 1 February 2003, but she resigned on 1 January 2003 to assume the post of Minister of the Special Secretariat of Policy for Women in President Luiz Inácio Lula da Silva tenure.

In 2006, she ran for federal deputy for her state, but obtained only one substitute. However, in February 2009 she took office due to the death of the incumbent Adão Pretto and also ran the following year. In 2013, Fernandes joined the Communist Party of Brazil (PCdoB).

== Personal life ==
Fernandes parents were Antônio Firpo Xavier and Elça Morais Xavier. She is married to Carlos Alberto Tabará Fernandes and they have two children.
