= Adão Pretto Filho =

Brazilian politician (born 1987)

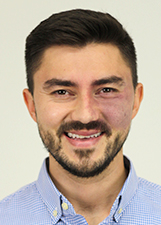
- Pretto in 2020

Member of the Legislative Assembly of Rio Grande do Sul
- Incumbent
- Assumed office 1 February 2023

Personal details
- Born: 2 May 1987 (age 38)
- Party: Workers' Party
- Parent: Adão Pretto (father)
- Relatives: Edegar Pretto (brother)

Adão Pretto Filho (born 2 May 1987) is a Brazilian politician serving as a member of the Legislative Assembly of Rio Grande do Sul since 2023. He is the son of Adão Pretto and the brother of Edegar Pretto.
