= Adão Pretto =

Brazilian politician and farmer

Federal deputy
- In office 1986–2009

Personal details
- Born: December 18, 1945 Redentora, Rio Grande do Sul, Brazil
- Died: February 5, 2009 Porto Alegre, Rio Grande do Sul, Brazil
- Party: Workers' Party
- Children: Edegar Pretto; Adão Pretto Filho
- Occupation: farmer Statesman

Adão Pretto was a farmer, Brazilian politician and founder of the "landless movement". In 1990, he was elected as a federal deputy auditor and re-elected as congressman in 1994, 1998, 2002 and 2006.

== See also ==
- Central Única dos Trabalhadores
- Landless Workers' Movement
