= Maria da Penha =

Brazilian activist (born 1945)

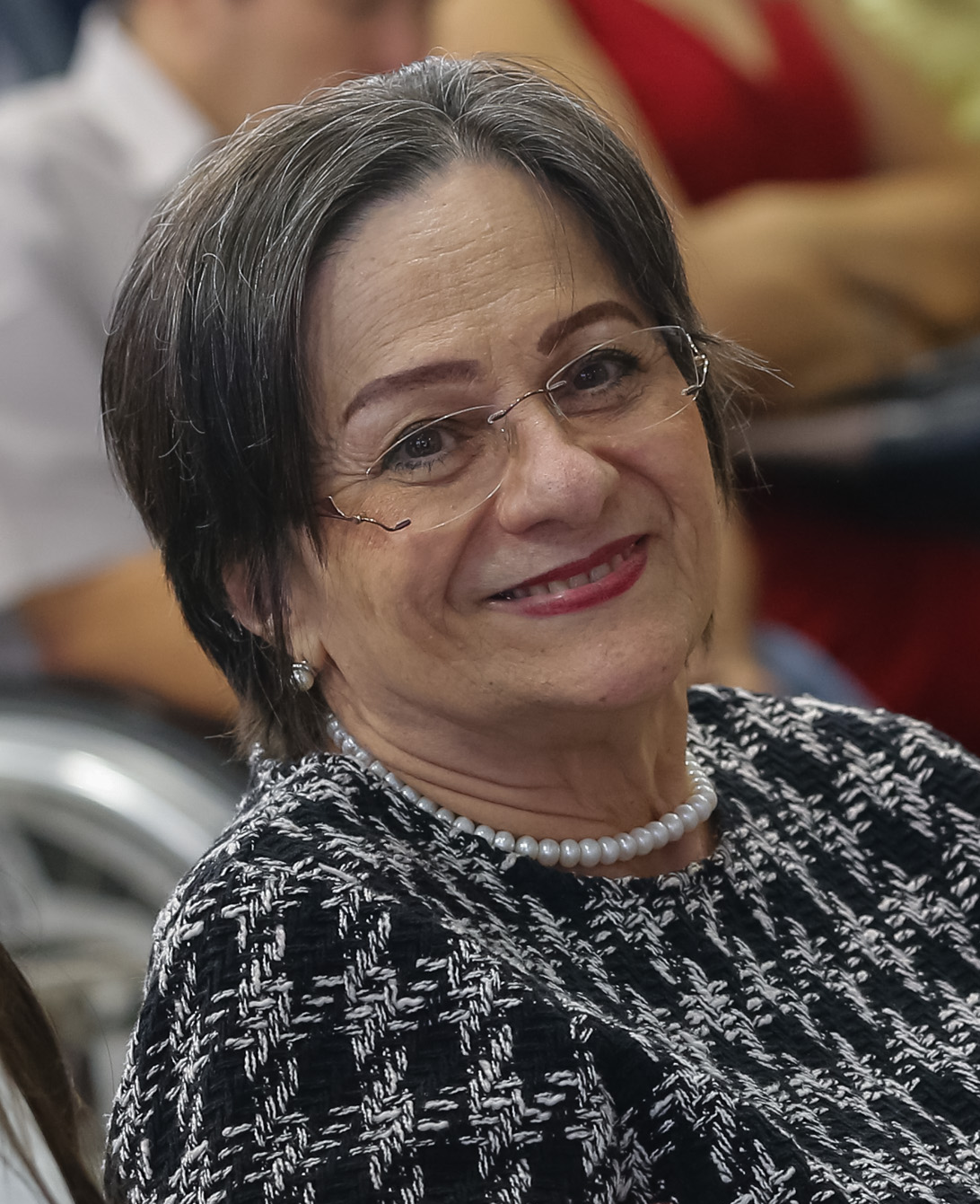
- Maria da Penha in 2018
- Born: Maria da Penha Maia Fernandes; 1 February 1945 (age 81); Fortaleza, Ceará, Brazil
- Occupations: Biopharmacist; activist against domestic violence
- Spouse: Marco Antonio Heredia Viveros (m. 1976, divorced)

Maria da Penha Maia Fernandes (Brazilian Portuguese: [maˈɾi.ɐ dɐ ˈpẽɲɐ]; born 1 February 1945) is a Brazilian biopharmacist and women human rights defender. She advocates for women rights, particularly against domestic violence. Born in 1945 in Fortaleza, in the Brazilian state of Ceará, Maria da Penha was a victim of domestic violence by her husband. She brought a case against her attacker to be condemned, first in the Supreme Federal Court of Brazil and later in the Inter-American Court of Human Rights.

On August 7, 2006, the president of Brazil Luiz Inácio Lula da Silva put the Federal Brazilian Law 11340 into practice. Now known as the "Maria da Penha Law", it increased the severity of punishment for domestic violence against women, whenever it occurred in a domestic or family environment. In cities with 60,000 people or more, domestic violence courts and shelters for women were established. Penha says, "The problem is not the law but in its application. Unfortunately, these instruments exist only in big cities."

== History ==
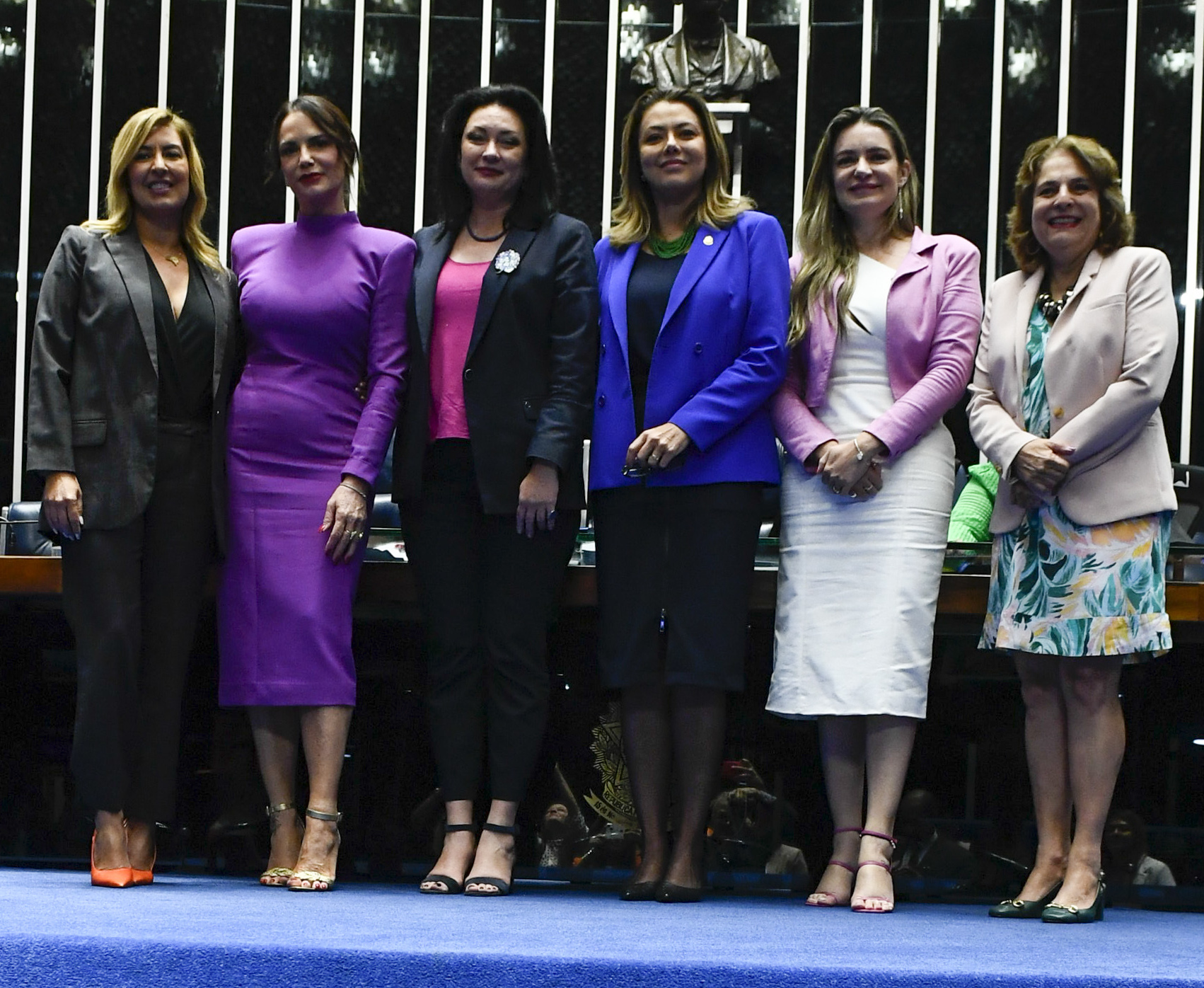
Celebrating the 17th anniversary of her law in 2023: Renata Gil, Luiza Brunet; UN Women Brazil Anastasia Divinskaya; president and petitioner senator Leila Barros (PDT-DF); senator Augusta Brito (PT-CE) and Márcia Abrahão

She married Colombian economist and teacher Marco Antonio Heredia Viveros in 1976. She says, "When his Brazilian citizenship was granted, he showed his true colours. I had no idea of how to make him go back to what he was like before." Regarding the abuse she was subjected to, she said, "I didn't know if he would wake up in a good mood or a bad mood. He became violent, hitting the children for no reason. That started to make me feel unsafe in my marriage." In 1983, he attempted to kill her twice. The first time he shot her while she was asleep, but she survived. Heredia told the police that the house had been broken into, and the intruders had shot Maria. Penha returned from the hospital, paralyzed from the waist down. He then told her she was not allowed to have friends or family visit her without his consent. A second attempt on her life was made soon after she returned, when he tried to electrocute her while she was in the shower. In the following year, Maria da Penha began a legal process against Heredia. Seven years later, he was sentenced to 15 years in prison. The defense appealed the sentence and the conviction was overturned. A new trial was held in 1996 and a sentence of 10 years was applied. In 2001, Heredia was sentenced to eight years in prison. Through legal resources, he was jailed for two years. Heredia was released in 2002.

In 2001, the episode came to the Inter-American Commission on Human Rights of the Organization of American States (OAS) and for the first time in history it was considered a crime of domestic violence. The Commission published a report blaming the Brazilian government for negligence and omission regarding domestic violence. On August 7, 2006, the Brazilian government sanctioned the law against domestic violence toward women, entering into force on September 22 of that year.

Today, Penha is coordinator of studies of the Associação de Parentes e Amigos de Vítimas de Violência (APAVV – Association of Relatives and Friends of Victims of Violence), in the Brazilian state of Ceará. She attended the ceremony of the sanction of Brazilian law that bears her name, together with other ministers and representatives of the Brazilian feminist movement.
