= Edegar Pretto =

Brazilian politician (born 1971)

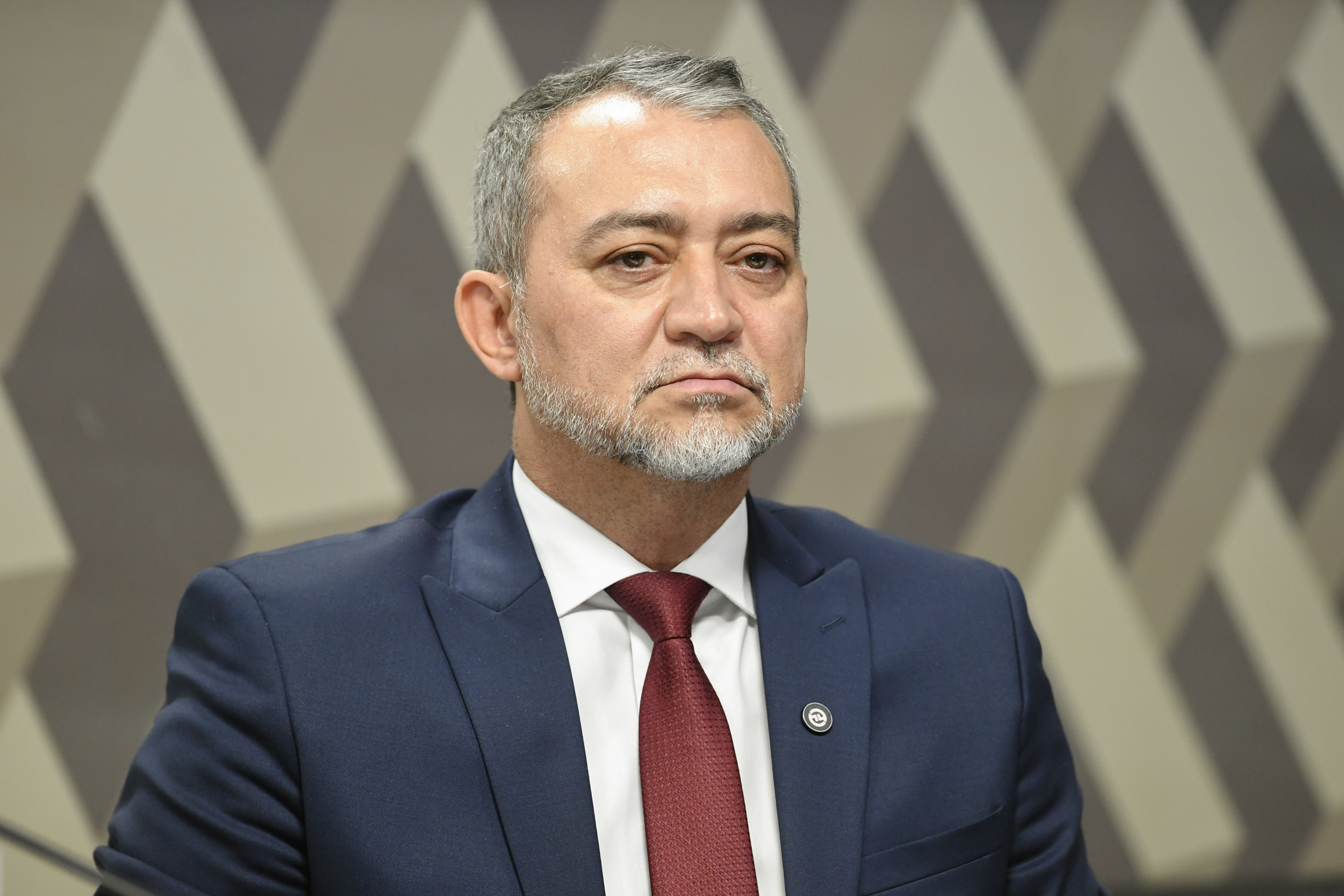
- Pretto in 2025

President of the National Supply Company
- Incumbent
- Assumed office 22 March 2023
- Preceded by: Guilherme Ribeiro

Personal details
- Born: 17 June 1971 (age 54)
- Party: Workers' Party (since 1989)
- Parent: Adão Pretto (father)
- Relatives: Adão Pretto Filho (brother)

João Edegar Pretto (born 17 June 1971) is a Brazilian politician serving as president of the National Supply Company since 2023. He was a member of the Legislative Assembly of Rio Grande do Sul from 2011 to 2022, and served as president of the assembly from 2017 to 2018. He is the son of Adão Pretto and the brother of Adão Pretto Filho.
