= Violence against women in Brazil =

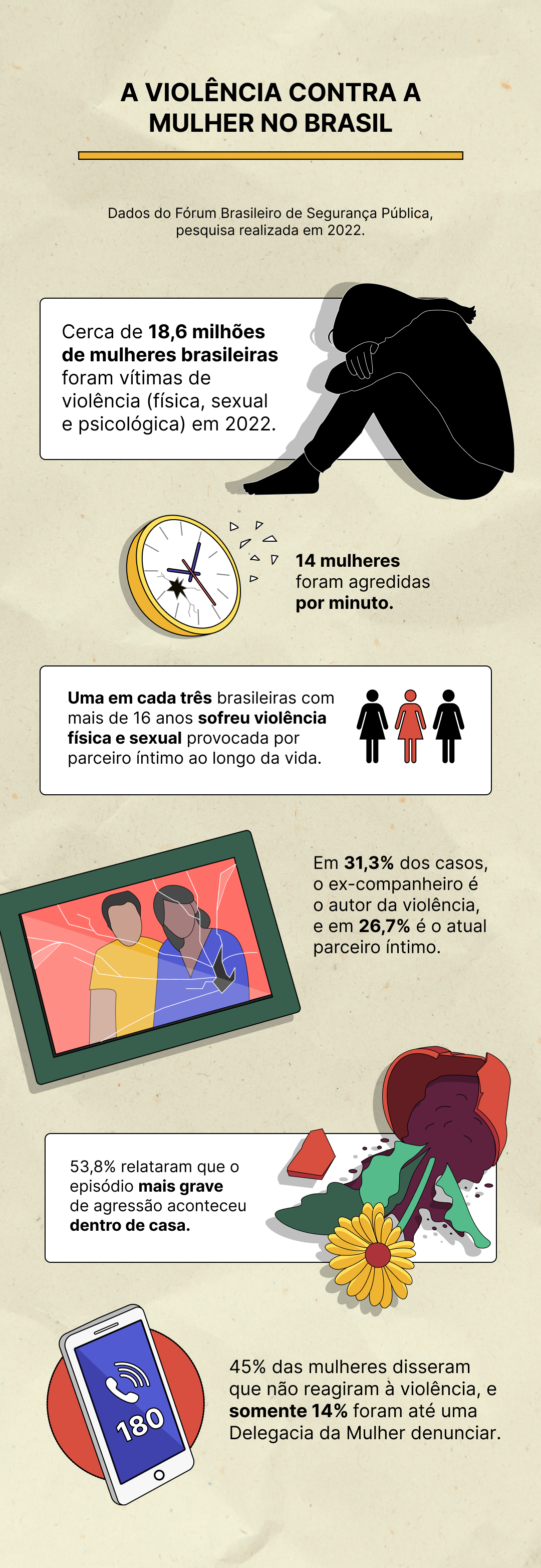
Some data on violence against women in Brazil.

Violence against women in Brazil is a frequent issue in the country. According to data from the Brazilian Public Security Forum, in conjunction with the Datafolha Institute, the majority of the Brazilian population feels that violence against women increased between 2007 and 2017, with the highest perception in the Northeast Region of Brazil (76%), followed by the Southeast Region (73%). Furthermore, two out of three Brazilians witnessed a woman being assaulted in 2016, with the highest perception of this violence found among Black and Pardo individuals.

According to 2017 data from the National Council of Justice, there were 896,000 cases related to violence against women awaiting trial.

== Response ==
Internationally, Brazil has signed and ratified two international treaties on the subject: the Belém do Pará Convention, which entered into force on 27 December 1995, and the Convention on the Elimination of All Forms of Discrimination against Women, which entered into force on 2 March 1984.

=== Laws ===
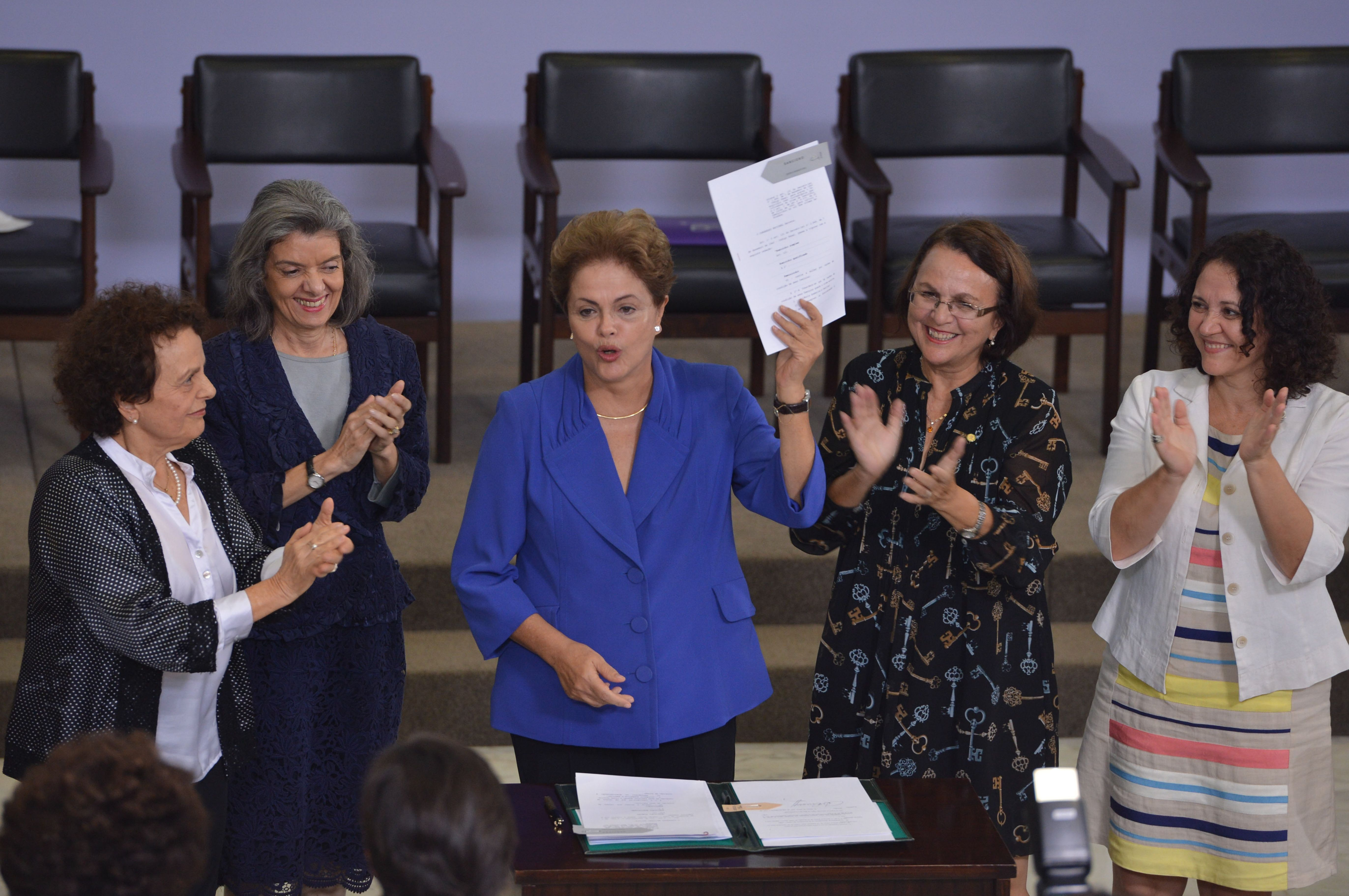
In a ceremony at the Palácio do Planalto, former President Dilma Rousseff signs the Femicide Law.

Following Brazil's condemnation by the Organization of American States for its inaction and tolerance of violence against women, the Maria da Penha Law was approved in August 2006, after pressure from feminist and human rights movements. This law defines domestic and family violence against women as "any action or omission based on gender that causes death, injury, physical, sexual or psychological suffering, and moral or patrimonial damage." It also established mechanisms to combat domestic and family violence against women, such as emergency protective measures, the creation of Domestic and Family Violence Courts with civil and criminal jurisdiction, the prohibition of pecuniary penalties, and the stipulation that women cannot waive their right to file a complaint. By the law itself, the protection offered is independent of sexual orientation.

Law No. 13.104, which included the aggravating circumstance of femicide in the Brazilian Penal Code, was published on 9 March 2015. Femicide is a crime foreseen in the Brazilian Penal Code when committed "against a woman for reasons of her gender." Paragraph 2-A of Article 121 stipulates that there are reasons related to gender when the crime involves domestic and family violence and contempt or discrimination against women.

On 28 April 2026, the Brazilian Federal Senate approved, in a vote without a roll call, the creation of the National Registry of Persons Convicted of Violence Against Women.
