= Redentora =

Municipality in Rio Grande do Sul, Brazil

Coordinates: 27°40′S 53°39′W

- Municipality
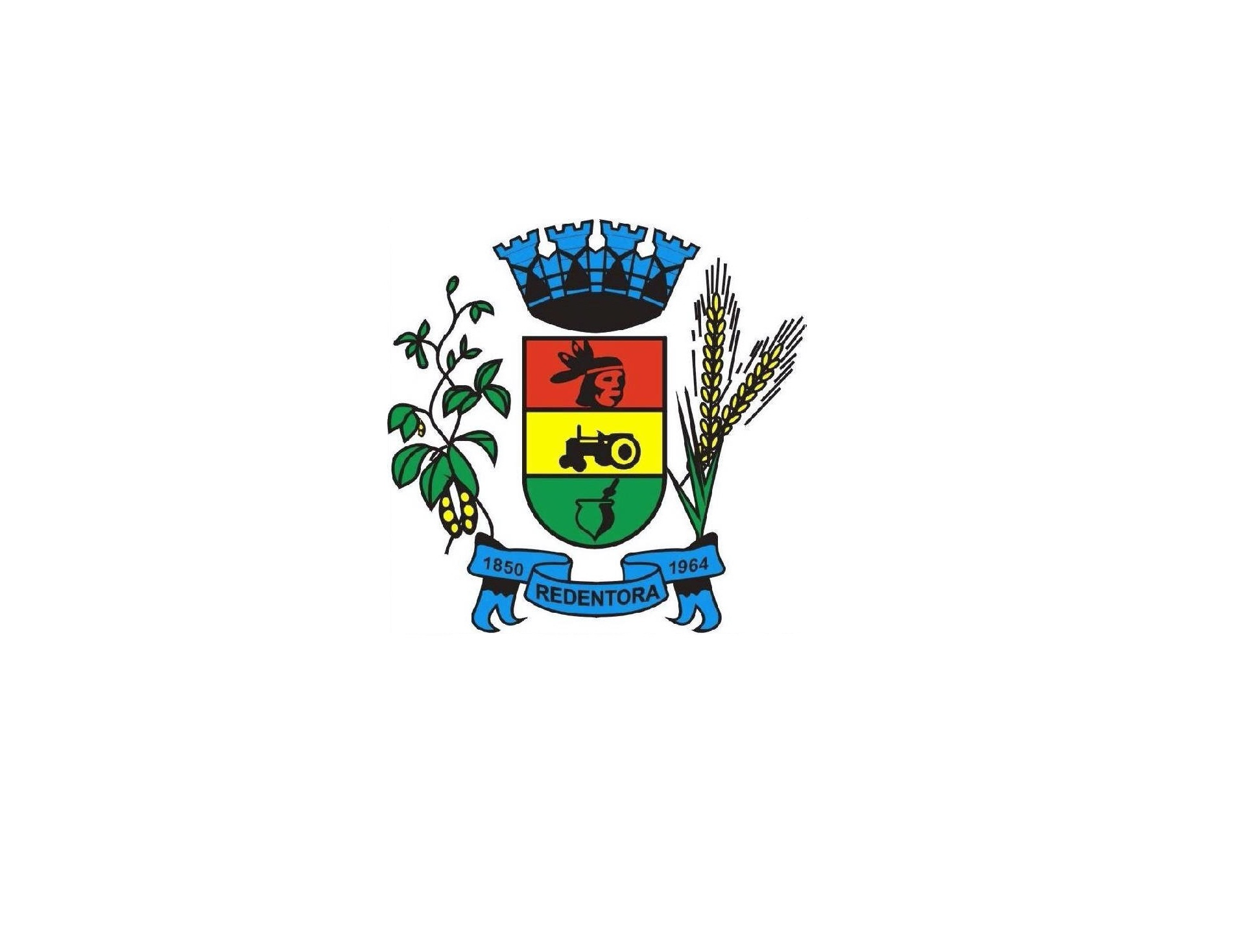
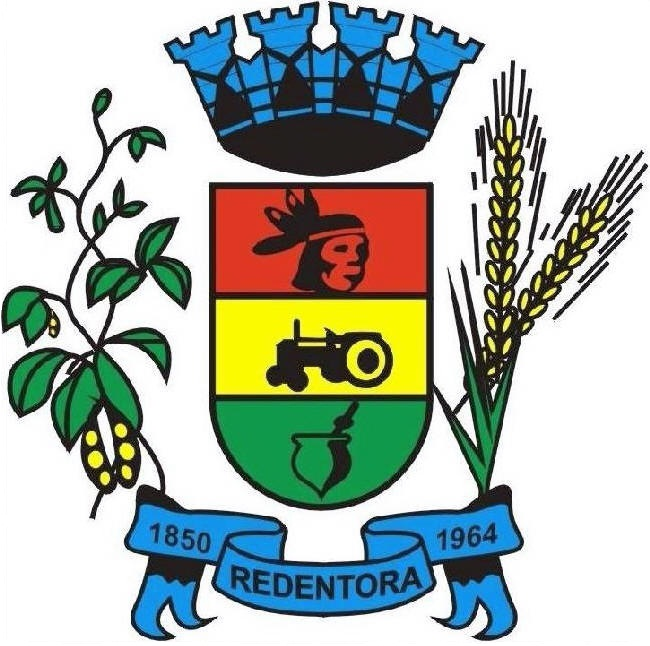
- Flag Coat of arms

- Location of Redentora in Rio Grande do Sul
- Country: Brazil
- Region: South
- State: Rio Grande do Sul
- Mesoregion: Noroeste Rio-Grandense
- Microregion: Três Passos
- Founded: 12 April 1964

Government
  - Mayor: Nilson Paulo Costa (MDB, 2021 - 2024)

Area
  - Total: 303.705 km^{2} (117.261 sq mi)

Population (2021)
  - Total: 11,782
  - Density: 38.794/km^{2} (100.48/sq mi)
- Demonym: Redentorense
- Time zone: UTC−3 (BRT)
- Website: Official website

Redentora is a municipality in the state of Rio Grande do Sul, Brazil. As of 2020, the estimated population was 11,669.

== See also ==
- List of municipalities in Rio Grande do Sul
