= Women's police station =

Police station specializing in handling crimes with female victims

Women's police stations (WPS; also units or offices) (Spanish: Comisaría de la Mujer, Portuguese: Delegacia da mulher) are police stations specializing in handling crimes with female victims. The "women's police station" concept was first introduced in the Kozhikode District of Kerala, India on 27 October 1973. In 1985, a similar concept was introduced in São Paulo, Brazil; this station processed over 2,000 reports in its first six months of operations. Similar stations have also been established by police in Africa.

Officers at these stations are only allowed to respond to certain crimes, such as psychological violence, domestic violence, family violence, as well as specific types of threats and sexual violence. Some units offer financial help, counseling, and medical care for women who are having trouble.

== Aim ==
Women's police stations are located in mostly Latin American countries where rates of rape and violence against women are high. In 2022, over 4,050 women were recorded victims of femicide across 26 countries and territories in Latin America and the Caribbean. That year, Brazil recorded 699 femicides; however, researchers found that in areas with women's police stations, the homicide rate for women aged 15 to 24 decreased by 50%, and by 17% for women overall. However, some women in Latin America do not even know about their rights to accessing these stations; in Brazil, a majority of surveyed women had received training or information about their rights at least once from various sources, with 54% reporting access to such resources. This compares to 42% in Nicaragua, 34% in Peru, and 23% in Ecuador.

== Results ==
Women's police stations have greatly expanded since 1985. As of 2010, Brazil had the most WPS, with 475, followed by 34 in Ecuador, 59 in Nicaragua, and 27 in Peru. Women's police stations have played a critical role in broadening victims' citizenship rights by providing a platform to report violence, which was once overlooked and viewed as a private matter. In São Paulo, these stations registered 310,058 cases of violence against women in 2000 alone. Language barriers and the inability to get to a station is still a problem. Women's police stations are located in more populated areas making it hard for women in rural areas to get to them, and women who do not speak the same language as the policewomen can not communicate effectively.

Over 80% of Brazilians consider WPS the most effective government policy to address domestic violence while more than 50% of citizens in cities with WPS can identify their locations. However, the effectiveness of WPS is heavily contingent on perceptions of police legitimacy to encourage reporting. Empirical evidence suggests that WPS in Brazil can produce positive effects on perceptions of trust in police for both men and women, contributing to better evaluations of police effectiveness. There is also evidence on the positive effect of WPS in men's attitudes condemning violence against women in municipalities in Brazil with the specialized services.

== See also ==
- Women-only space
- Women's shelter
