= Vela Blagoeva =

Bulgarian writer, journalist and teacher

- Вела Благоева
- Born: Victoria Atanasova Zhivkova (Bulgarian: Виктория Атанасова Живкова); 29 September 1859; Tarnovo, Ottoman Bulgaria
- Died: 21 July 1921 (aged 61); Sofia, Kingdom of Bulgaria
- Occupations: teacher, socialist writer, women's activist
- Years active: 1871–1921
- Known for: Bulgarian Women's Union
- Spouse: Dimitar Blagoev

Vela Blagoeva (Bulgarian: Вела Благоева; born Виктория Атанасова Живкова; 29 September 1859 – 21 July 1921) was a Bulgarian writer, journalist and teacher. She is noted as one of the founders of the women's movement in Bulgaria. After completing a basic education in the Ottoman Empire, she taught until she received a scholarship to further her education in Russia. While taking courses in the Russian normal school and pedagogy training courses, she became a socialist. Returning to Bulgaria, she taught school and wrote editorials for a wide number of publications. In 1901, she joined with a group of feminists to found the Bulgarian Women's Union. Two years later, she organized the first Socialist women's organization and conference held in Bulgaria.

== Biography ==
Victoria Atanasova Zhivkova was born on 29 September 1859 in Tarnovo, in Ottoman Bulgaria to Neda Spiridonova and Atanas Zhivkov. She was the youngest of five children, including sisters, Mariola and Rose, and brothers, Georgi Zhivkov who was a politician and served three times as head of the National Assembly of Bulgaria, and Nikola Zhivkov, founder of the first kindergarten in Bulgaria and poet who wrote the lyrics of the national anthem, Shumi Maritsa. Their father died while the children were young and her older brothers took responsibility for raising the family. She finished the middle school for girls in Tarnovo and went to high school in Gabrovo, graduating from the Gabrovo Girls' School in 1871. She became a teacher and taught in Berkovitsa, Istanbul, Tarnovo and Varna. In 1874, Zhivkova and her brother Nikola used their summer holiday to collect monies to build a girls' school and church in Varna. During the Russo-Turkish War, she served as a nurse at the 50th field hospital in Svishtov. When the war ended in 1878, Zhivkova obtained a scholarship from the Slavic Charity Committee of St. Petersburg and began attending pedagogical courses at the Mariinsky high school for girls, graduating in 1881. She returned to Bulgaria and taught in Edirne and later in Bitolia. Returning to Russia, between 1882 and 1884, she studied in St. Petersburg taking the Bestuzhev Courses to earn a teaching degree. While in Russia, she was influenced by the student protests against the tsarist autocracy and met St. Petersburg University student Dimitar Blagoev, whom she married.

=== Career ===
Blagoeva returned to Sofia in 1884 and began teaching at the Sofia Exemplary Girls' School. In July 1885, she established with Dimitar the first socialist journal in Bulgaria, Modern Trends (Bulgarian: Съвременний показател) which they co-edited. She wrote articles about discrimination against teachers, equality and women's education. For the duration of the Serbo-Bulgarian War she volunteered as a nurse at Slivnitsa and Pirot. Because of her outspoken political ideology and support for Socialism, Blagoevna was repeatedly transferred or dismissed from teaching posts. Between 1884 and 1912, she taught in a succession of schools in Sofia (1884–1885), Shumen (1886–1887), Vidin (1897–1890), Veliko Tarnovo (1890–1892), Stara Zagora (1892–1893), Plovdiv (1893–1896), Tulcha (1901–1902), Plovdiv (1902–1903), Sofia (1905–1907) and Marashki Trustenik (1907–1912). In 1912, she had health issues and though she retired from teaching, she continued with other endeavors.

In 1894, Blagoeva began the magazine Case (Bulgarian: Дело) which was founded to disseminate socialist literary works of Bulgarian authors. She featured the poems by Kiril Hristov, Dimitar Polyanov (1876–1953) and Ivan St. Andreychin (1872–1934), and prose from Anton Strashimirov. She edited the journal until 1896, when she was forced to suspend publication, primarily because of her husband's activities. In 1901, she was a co-founder of the first national women's organization, Bulgarian Women's Union (Bulgarian: Български женски съюз) (BZhS) along with Dimitrana Ivanova, Ekaterina Karavelova, Anna Karima, Kina Konova, Julia Malinova, and others. Two years later Blagoeva led the faction that split from the BZhS for ideological differences. She believed that the BzhS had become too focused on upper-class women's issues alone and was not focused on the worker's needs. She founded a journal called Women's Labor (Bulgarian: Дамски труда) where she began advocating for worker's rights.

In 1905, Blagoeva founded the first educational group for women workers which focused on a socialist message and by August of that year had organized a conference for socialist women in Sofia. These actions drew criticism, including from her husband, on the basis that male colleagues believed that women should remain part of the united workers movement. While she remained against attempts to unite all women under one umbrella organization, Blagoeva argued with male colleagues that women had the right to make their own decisions. While all of her writings were devoted to socialism, she wrote about women's emancipation from the societal strictures of patriarchy and subordination and urged women's independence, equal education, paid labor, access to education and the abolition of punishment for prostitution. She published widely in newspapers and journals including Bulgarian collection (Bulgarian: Bulgarska sbirka), Day (Bulgarian: Den), Democratic review (Bulgarian: Democraticheski pregled), Firefly (Bulgarian: Svetulka), Just Deed (Bulgarian: Pravo delo), New Times (Bulgarian: Novo vreme), Red laughter (Bulgarian: Cherven smjah), School review (Bulgarian: Uchilishten pregled) and Teacher (Bulgarian: Uchitel) and edited Deed (Bulgarian: Delo), Women's Bulletin (Bulgarian: Zhenski Bjuletin). Often her earnings, due to her husband's unemployment for his dissidence, were the sole support of their family.

=== Private life ===
Blagoeva and Dimitar had four children: Stela (1887-1954), Natalia (1889-1943), Vladimir (1893-1925) and Dimitur (1895-1918). Dimitur was killed during World War I. Blagoeva died in Sofia on 21 July 1921. Posthumously, a school in her hometown was named in her honor.

== Selected works ==
- Методика на българския език за народните елементарни и трикласни училища [Methods of Bulgarian folk language for elementary schools and three grades] (in Bulgarian). 1892.
- Царица Теодора. Скица из българския живот от XIV век [Queen Theodora. Sketch of Bulgarian life from the XIV century] (in Bulgarian). 1894.
- Процес [Process] (in Bulgarian). Plovdiv, Bulgaria: Ignatov. 1898. OCLC 252240435.
- След бурята [After the Storm] (in Bulgarian). 1904.
- Две повести из народния живот на българите [Two novellas around the folk life of the Bulgarians] (in Bulgarian). Plovdiv, Bulgaria: Chrělkov. 1904. OCLC 252240846.
