= Committee of the Bulgarian Women's Movement =

National Committee on the Bulgarian Women's Movement
- Комитет на Движението на българските жени
- Formation: 1968
- Dissolved: 1990
- Location: People's Republic of Bulgaria
- President: Elena Lagadinova
- Publication: Woman Today (bg: Zhenata Dnes)

The Committee of the Bulgarian Women's Movement (CBWM) (Bulgarian: Komitet na bâlgarskite zheni, sometimes Committee of Bulgarian Women) (1968–1990) was a government-affiliated organization in Bulgaria that aimed to improve women's participation in the labor force, decrease the declining birth rate, and promote gender equality during the Bulgarian socialist era. It accomplished these goals by advocating for women's rights, redefining gender roles, and securing state support for women's issues. Notable accomplishments include maternity leave and abortion rights and a program of social engineering to encourage men to take a more active role in child-rearing and homemaking activities. The CBWM played a prominent role in securing development aid for struggling economies in Africa and trained female leaders in Bulgaria to help feminist activists from Zambia. The committee has been recently recognized by scholars for its acute impacts of women's rights at the international level, with many progressive policies emerging directly from the committee's initiatives and influences. The CBWM was dissolved in 1990 after the fall of communism in Bulgaria.

== History ==
There were a number of preceding groups and bodies which worked to advance women's rights prior to the founding of the CBWM. One such group was the Bulgarian Women's Union, which was established in 1901. Throughout the first half of the 20th century, Bulgarian women continued to organize, and in the Dimitrov Constitution of 1947, legal equality between men and women was ultimately granted. The Bulgarian Popular Women's Union, a women's committee that was subsequently turned over to Rada Todorova, was founded in 1945 by Tsola Dragoicheva. The BPWU concentrated on expanding women's access to education and jobs while also working to eradicate illiteracy among women. The BPWU was disbanded in 1950 by Valko Chervenkov's Stalinist regime, and all domestic operations pertaining to women's issues were delegated to various other organizations. The Committee of Democratic Bulgarian Women was still in place, but it was only permitted to speak on behalf of Bulgaria in foreign fora. Bulgarian women did not have a centralized group devoted to advancing their rights and interests until the CBWM was founded.

Established in 1968 as a mass organization within the Bulgarian Communist Party, the CBWM was initially tasked with promoting women's education and employment opportunities. In the 1970s, the organization shifted its focus to address issues such as equal pay and childcare. The CBWM had a decentralized structure, with municipal branches and a national bureau that represented the organization to the Bulgarian government and on the international stage. The committee accepted women who were bezpartien (without party affiliations), and their activities were open to all. The only paid state employees were the presidents of the municipal bureaus and members of the national bureau. The women who held the remaining jobs did so voluntarily since they had other formal employment obligations. Regardless of the greater strain of this voluntary activity, everyday women all around the nation actively supported the CBWM.

== Early years ==
The CBWM played a pivotal role in the progression of women's rights in Bulgaria during their early years. In 1969, the CBWM and the editorial collective at Zhenata Dnes (Woman Today) initiated a national survey to understand why women were not having more children, as the falling birthrate was a pressing issue at the time. The survey found that women were struggling to manage childcare while working outside the home. Women spent eight hours a day at work, and an additional one to two hours commuting, while also spending four and a half hours on household chores, leaving little time for other activities. This double burden was causing women to have less time for their children and ultimately resulting in a falling birthrate.

The CBWM supported a vast extension of governmental entitlements for mothers instead. They advocated for the maximum socialization of domestic work and urged the government to build more kindergartens and daycare centers, as well as the implementation of a new maternity leave policy that would grant women a two-year paid vacation from work with the assurance that their positions would be kept for them during that time. They also fought for maternity leave to count towards women's pensions as time worked. The CBWM proposal also included a clause for the state to pay new mothers child allowances following the birth of a child. The CBWM promoted the development of cafeterias at workplaces where meals could be prepared for women to take home after their manufacturing hours. These regulations would ideally lessen the combined burden that each woman must bear. No other socialist nation had such comprehensive maternity benefits in place to support working moms when this was presented in 1970.

Their advocacy led to a key Politburo decision that established many of the new social entitlements for mothers in March 1973. The decision included explicit language aimed at convincing Bulgarian men to be more active in the home, as exemplified through the decision of the Politburo of the Central Committee of the Bulgarian Communist Party (1974):

The reduction and alleviation of women's household work depends greatly on the common participation of the two spouses in the organization of family life. It is therefore imperative a) to combat outdated views, habits, and attitudes as regards the allocation of work within the family; b) to prepare young men for the performance of household duties from childhood and adolescence both by the school and society and by the family...

The CBWM's efforts in promoting women's rights had a significant impact on Bulgarian society and paved the way for further advancements in the years to come. In particular, the CBWM's focus on state support for mothers helped to address the double burden that many women faced, which was essential for improving women's access to education and employment. As a result of the CBWM's advocacy, Bulgaria became a leader in maternity leave policies, and other socialist countries eventually followed suit in enacting similar policies.

== Organization ==
The structure of the CWBM followed the conventions of many other mass organizations that were established within the Teodor Zhivkov political regime, with functional duties dispersed between national and municipal representatives. Following the dissolvement of Bulgarian Popular Women's Union, the Zhivkov government undertook reorganization of the CWBM, resulting in the concentration of the newly constituted CWBM's powers and influence in 1968. Committee leadership at the national level consisted of a president and several secretaries who were elected at national conferences. These election results often worked to confirm already established political appointments. Committee staff at the national level, as well as regional presidents, were the only waged positions. The national branch worked to facilitate large scale programs and initiatives, such as the widespread collection of demographic and sociocultural data for analysis and the formulation of national policy recommendations.

At the regional scale, every Bulgarian municipality included a CWBM branch that was headed by a locally elected president and secretaries. The remainder of the municipal branches were staffed majorly by local female volunteers, and accepting individuals who aligned with any political party, including those self-declared as 'unaligned', as well as those with varying levels of formal education. This structure, unlike that of many other organizations, maximized representation of Bulgarian women. Municipal branches largely worked to collaborate with other local women's organizations in order to facilitate activities that municipal female populations would request, such as cultural knowledge programs in rural populations.

=== Zhenata Dnes (Woman Today) ===
At the national scale, the CWBM also employed a magazine staff in charge of authoring, editing, and publishing the Bulgarian magazine Zhenata Dnes (Woman Today). This magazine functioned both as a mechanism for spreading Bulgarian Socialist propaganda, but also as a reflection and subtle critique of the impacts of socialism on the lives of Bulgarian women. The magazine underwent censorship and regulation practices imposed by the government's Central Committee, limiting the level of criticism and topics that could be reasonably published in its operation. The magazine further acted as a quasi-democratic forum for women's issues, as it encouraged readers to send letters outlining citizen concerns, which would inform wider analysis in contemporary issues and popular values. Under the creative direction of Editors-in-Chief such as Sonya Bakish and Elonora Turlakova, the Woman Today magazine permitted the committee to enjoy relative independence from the national government, largely due to holding a higher degree of financial autonomy.

== Notable members ==
Throughout the committee's operation, a number of women have held influential roles within the organization that particularly contributed to its wide array of successes.

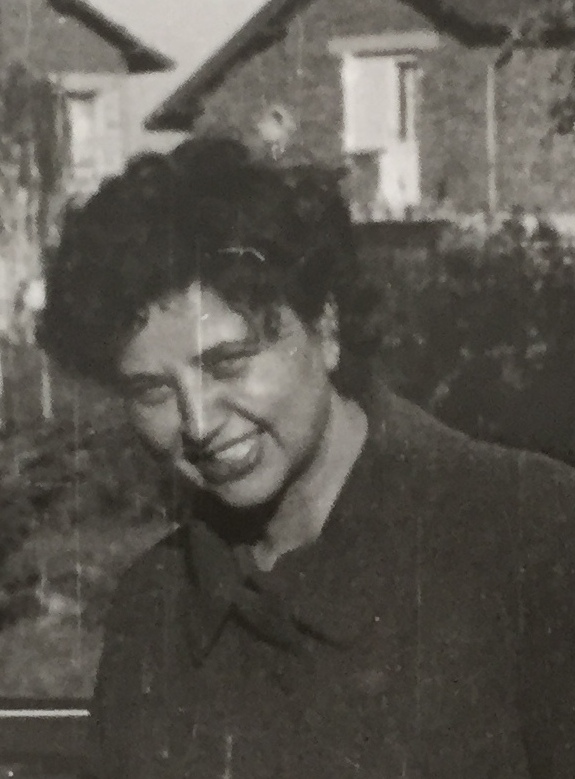
Elena Lagadinova

=== Elena Lagadinova ===
Elena Lagadinova (Bg: Елена Атанасова Лагадинова) (May 9, 1930 – October 29, 2017) was instated as the first and only president of the CBWM after being hand selected by then Prime Minister Todor Zhivkov. Lagadinova also served as the First Secretary of Zhivkov's Fatherland Front. Formally trained as an agronomist and genetic engineer, Lagadinova worked to incorporate quantitative analytical approaches to women's issues in Bulgaria through significant collaboration with the Central Statistical Office in a massive survey effort. Through private communications, Lagadinova chastised the Central Committee and Prime Minister on governmental policy and responses to a number of women's issues, including contentious topics such as abortion, as well as private employers who were found to be violating national labor codes. Lagadinova served as the General Rapporteur on the third United Nations World Conference on Women.

=== Sonya Bakish ===
Sonya Bakish (Bg: Соня Бакиш) (June 6, 1923 – April 22, 2010) was a member of the Women Today editorial collective, serving as its editor-in-chief for twenty-two years. As the wife of Bulgarian communist politician Stanko Todorov, the longest-standing Prime Minister of Bulgaria, Bakish enjoyed greater editorial autonomy in the publication of Women Today. Bakish's "very strong personality" enabled her to take on a lot of personal initiatives in her role, including encouraging her journalists to write on topics typically avoided in popular media, such as sexual issues and critiques of the state socialist system. Bakish's ability to defy conventions in her publications, and object censorship done by the Central Committee, led to increased popularization of the magazine.

== Notable accomplishments ==
=== Maternity leave and abortion rights ===
In 1971, Bulgaria became the first socialist country to grant maternity leave as a constitutional privilege, thanks largely to the efforts of the CWBM and Lagadinova, in particular. In addition, despite the abortion rate far outstripping the birth rate, the Politburo heeded the CBWM's advice to avoid an outright ban on abortion as had been done in Romania. Instead, the Politburo agreed to limit abortions only for women with fewer than two children, although in practice this limitation was relatively easy for women to circumvent.

=== Redefining gender roles ===
While it may have been the Politburo's intention to use the CBWM to address the declining birth rate while maintaining full female labour participation, in actuality the CBWM used its powerful platform to redefine many aspects of gender roles, within what is still today, a largely patriarchal society. Part of this was the belief among the Committee's ranks that children were not the sole responsibility of women. The organisation embarked on an ambitious and long-lasting program of social engineering using Zhenata Dnes (Woman Today) to normalise the idea that men should be more active in child-rearing and other homemaking activities. Evidence of the powerful effect this had on women's self-perceptions can be found in a poll conducted by the CBWM in 1979, which indicated that an increasing number of women (39.9% of those surveyed) identified themselves as "modern women", who "placed an equal emphasis on her family responsibilities and her professional life, finding self-worth in both spheres".

=== Women's advocacy ===
The redefining of many gender roles was not just limited to the household. The passionate involvement of women in the organization gave it the ability to influence many aspects of the Politburo's policymaking, as evidenced by their success in swaying the Politburo's opinion away from an outright ban on abortion. Archival evidence also demonstrates how vital the CBWM was in relaying the concerns of ordinary Bulgarian women to the most powerful elites in the Bulgarian government, thus placing feminist issues at the forefront of political thinking. Finally, women's rights and state support for women's issues were expanded significantly in 1973 when the "Enhancing the Role of Women in the Building of a Developed Socialist Society" laws came into effect. Under these new laws, the CBWM had the power to hold employers and state agencies accountable to the new laws, enhancing the role of women in the enforcement of their own protections.

== Wider contributions ==
Under the work of the committee, Bulgaria became one of the most progressive countries in regards to legislation concerning women across both socialist and capitalist states. At the 1975 United Nations World Conference on Women, Bulgaria was able to brag of these successes to other countries, after which the Committee began to forge connections abroad, notably within African states and with other socialist women's organizations. Progressive women-oriented policies of Bulgaria, including the provision of lenient pregnancy leave, maternity provisions to support working mothers, and increased access to abortions in the state provided a role model for other states to refer to. Further, during the Cold War, as capitalist and communist political ideologies aimed to be recognized as the better conduit of female wellbeing and equality, geopolitical competition between the socialist and capitalist blocs further fuelled support and development of women's rights on the international stage. At the 1985 United Nations World Conference on Women, the committee's president, Elena Lagadinova, was unanimously voted to represent all participating socialist countries as recognition for the extremely prominent role that Bulgaria played in training African women's activists during the UN Decade for Women.

The CBWM also played a prominent role in securing development aid for struggling economies in Africa, particularly in Zambia. Moreover, the organization used its apparatus for training female leaders in Bulgaria to help train feminist activists that had arrived from Zambia to learn how to apply state feminist lessons that Bulgarian women had learned over decades of participating in government. Furthermore, this training could also be applied to help these students advocate more successfully in international organizations, like the UN, as Bulgarian women had done during the UN Decade for Women. Kristen Ghodsee, a prominent scholar on the history of Bulgarian feminism, argued that women's movements played a large role in the superpower rivalries of the Cold War and suggested that the competition between communist and capitalist ideologies remarkably placed women's issues at the forefront of the global agenda.

=== Legacy in Bulgaria ===
The post socialist Bulgarian government enshrined many of the CBWM's accomplishments in the new constitution, including lenient abortion rights and maternity leaves that remain "among the most generous in the European Union". However, the Committee was not so widely-appreciated among all women in Bulgaria and represented a missed opportunity for many of Bulgaria's ethnic minorities. The Politburo's efforts to integrate Romani women into wider Bulgarian society, spearheaded by the CBWM, may have been successful at improving literacy rates and social participation among Romani women, however it was unable to inspire an independent Romani women's organization. In many ways, the successes of Bulgarian feminism are overshadowed by the fact that it was ethnic Bulgarians who remained at the forefront of these efforts and failed to account for the intersectionality of feminism and ethnicity in a country as multiethnic as Bulgaria.

Tourism remains a largely female-dominated industry, even within higher levels of management, mainly due to the slow and steady transition from state ownership to privatization in the tourism industry. Having pushed for the full participation of women in state-run enterprises through decades of social engineering and advocacy, the CBWM is credited with cementing government support for women in the workforce, even in the post-socialist era.

== Dissolution and subsequent committees ==
The CBWM disbanded in 1990 with the fall of communism. Numerous organizations have since emerged and continue to be actively working on women's rights and gender equality in Bulgaria. The Bulgarian Gender Research Foundation (BGRF), founded in 1998, has conducted extensive research and published reports on gender equality, discrimination, and women's rights in Bulgaria. The Bulgarian Fund for Women (BFW), created in 2004, aims to empower women by providing grants and support to women's NGOs and feminist groups in Bulgaria, focusing on issues such as violence against women, gender-based discrimination, and economic empowerment of women.

== See also ==
- Bulgarian Women's Union (CBWM preceding organization)
- Women in Bulgaria
- Marxist Feminism
