= Ekaterina Karavelova =

Bulgarian educator, translator, publicist, suffragist and women's rights activist

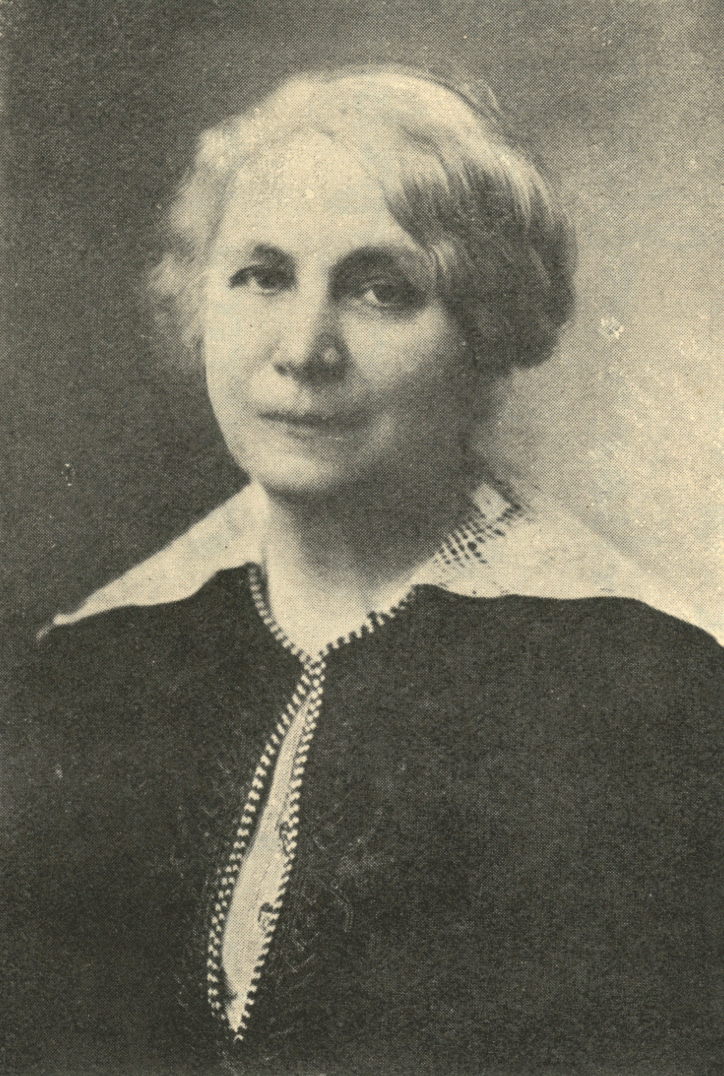
- Born: 21 October 1860; Ruse, Bulgaria
- Died: 1 April 1947 (aged 86); Sofia, Bulgaria
- Occupations: educator; translator; publicist; suffragist; women's rights activist

Ekaterina Karavelova (Bulgarian: Екатерина Каравелова), (21 October 1860 in Rouschuk – 1 April 1947 in Sofia), was a Bulgarian educator, translator, publicist, suffragist and women's rights activist.

== Early life and education ==
Ekaterina Karavelova was born on October 21, 1860, in Ruse, Bulgaria. Her father, a furrier, provided for the family through his work. Unfortunately, he died at a young age, leaving her mother to support their four children. She took on the responsibility by working as a laundress to raise Ekaterina, her two sisters, Sia and Mariola, and her brother Atanas.

Ekaterina's aunt, Kiryaki Nikolaki Minkova, a wealthy relative, played a significant role in her life and became her guardian. Thanks to her aunt's support, Ekaterina, at just nine years old, was sent to an aristocratic household in Moscow to continue her education. There, she completed her studies and earned a gold medal at a girls' high school. By the age of 17, she was fluent in Russian, French, German, and English.

== Career ==
In 1878, she returned to Bulgaria. With her extensive knowledge, Ekaterina pursued a career in teaching, working for 14 years in the cities of Ruse, Sofia, and Plovdiv. She later described how she started her teaching career: "The gymnasium in Ruse was used as a warehouse. September came, and there was no plan for reopening. I told my mother I would take the sheets from the living room, set up a few tables, and invite some children to study at our house. By the first week, my class was full of children of all ages...". This initiative marked the beginning of her dedication to education, where she stood out for her passion and creativity.

In Ruse, Ekaterina reconnected with Petko Karavelov, an old friend from Moscow, who later became the leader of the Liberal Party and brother of the writer Lyuben Karavelov. Though Ekaterina initially considered him a friend, Petko was deeply in love with her and proposed to her three times before she agreed. Ekaterina and Petko Karavelov married in 1880 and had three daughters: Rada (1880-1883), Viola (1884-1934), and Laura (1886-1913).

In 1880, Petko Karavelov became Prime Minister of Bulgaria, and the couple moved to Sofia. With her diplomatic skills and translation abilities, Ekaterina became a key collaborator for Karavelov in his political career. Her education in Russia and her husband's position allowed her to quickly integrate into the political elite of the newly formed Bulgarian state, where she supported his activities. She worked as his secretary and translator.

In 1881, during a period of political unrest and internal tensions, Prince Alexander I of Battenberg suspended the constitution. The Karavelovs moved to Plovdiv, where they began teaching and published the newspaper Independence, which included works by their close friend, Pencho Slaveykov.

In the May 1884 elections, the Liberal Party won a landslide victory, and Petko Karavelov became Prime Minister for a second term. This was a period of professional success for him, with Ekaterina remaining by his side as his trusted collaborator. However, political preferences shifted, and when Stefan Stambolov came to power in 1887 following the overthrow of Prince Alexander I of Battenberg, Karavelov became an opponent. In March 1891, Finance Minister Hristo Belchev was assassinated, and following his death, the police arrested opposition leaders, including Petko Karavelov, accusing him of involvement in the murder. The men were imprisoned in the Black Mosque (now the Saints Sedmochislenitsi Church), where, according to rumors, they were subjected to severe torture. In response, Ekaterina Karavelova took the initiative to gather the signatures of the mothers and wives of the prisoners. Together, they appealed to foreign diplomats in Bulgaria, expressing their concerns for the lives of their loved ones. This act of bravery was seen by the government as an act of betrayal. Ekaterina and the other women were arrested and placed under house arrest, with guards stationed outside their homes. During the trial, the prosecutor accused Ekaterina of treason for her intervention with foreign diplomats on behalf of the prisoners. She was sentenced to death by hanging.

Ekaterina managed to avoid the death sentence, while Petko Karavelov was released from prison in 1901. After his release, he resumed his position as Prime Minister of Bulgaria, but he died in 1903, possibly from a stroke or another health condition.

From 1912 to 1918, Ekaterina worked as a nurse, caring for wounded soldiers and the sick during the Balkan Wars (1912-1913) and World War I (1914-1918).

== Literary career ==
Ekaterina Karavelova had a prolific career as a writer, translator, and journalist. She contributed to various publications such as Cry for the Free People, The Constitution of Tarnovo, Homeland, Rainbow, Female Voice, The World of Women, and others. She authored numerous serials, pamphlets, poems, and short stories, most of which tackled political themes. She also played a significant role in the field of translation, producing numerous versions of classic works from Russian, French, German, and English literature. She translated prestigious authors such as Tolstoy, Dostoevsky, Hugo, Maupassant, Flaubert, and Dickens.

== Activism ==
As a teacher, Ekaterina had a profound impact on an entire generation of women who attended Sofia's first girls' high school, including Anna Karima and Ekaterina Zlatoustova.

In 1899, she founded the cultural women's organization Maika (which means "Mother" in Bulgarian) and served as its president until 1929. Ekaterina firmly believed that the independence and equality of women depended on the ability to earn a personal income. Therefore, she actively championed vocational education for women. In this spirit, the Maika association launched campaigns to establish vocational schools, including the first girls' vocational school in Bulgaria, the Maria Luisa school.

In 1901, Ekaterina co-founded the Union of Bulgarian Women with Vela Blagoeva, Kina Konova, Anna Karima, and Julia Malinova. This was the first feminist organization in Bulgaria, bringing together all local feminist groups established since 1878. The Union was created in response to the restrictions on women's education and their limited access to university studies in the 1890s, with the goal of fostering their intellectual growth. To this end, the Union organized congresses and used the Zhenski publication to communicate its ideas. The Union played a significant role in shaping debates on women's education and the professional status of teachers.

From 1915 to 1925, Ekaterina Karavelova served as vice president of the Union of Bulgarian Women, before becoming president of the Bulgarian branch of the International Women's League for Peace and Freedom in 1925. This organization aimed to unite women from different political, philosophical, and religious backgrounds to study the causes of war and promote lasting peace. It focused on issues such as peace, eliminating discrimination, protecting human rights, and advocating for disarmament at every level. Ekaterina represented Bulgaria at many international forums, including those in Washington and Dublin. During the 1926 Dublin Congress, she declared: "Our ideal is not the peace that governments impose without understanding the true aspirations of the people, but the peace of a true democracy."

In 1932, Ekaterina co-founded the Bulgarian-Romanian Association, and in 1935, she also co-founded the Bulgarian Writers' Association, taking on the role of president.

She represented Bulgaria as a delegate at numerous international conferences. In 1935, she spoke out against the death penalty for political prisoners in Bulgaria, and in 1938, she was part of a commission that opposed the closure of Bulgarian schools in Romania.

Ekaterina Karavelova was one of the first and most influential Bulgarian women to pave the way for women's affirmation as defenders of the Bulgarian national spirit. She remained dedicated to advocating for women's rights throughout her life and remained active in Bulgaria's social and cultural spheres until the end of her days.

== Involvement in the Committee for the Protection of the Jews ==
Her dedication to defending Bulgarian Jews was both long-lasting and relentless. With an unyielding resolve, she firmly believed that every human being was entitled to a life of freedom. At the age of eighty-three, she walked the streets of Sofia alone, determined to personally contribute to halting the deportation of Bulgarian Jews. However, many years passed before it was the Bulgarian Jews living in Israel, not the Bulgarians, who provided documentary evidence that their rescue was largely due to Ekaterina Karavelova's efforts.

Ekaterina Karavelova played a crucial role in founding the Committee for the Protection of Jews, working alongside writer Anton Strashimirov and professors Asen Zlatarov and Petko Stainov.

On January 23, 1941, the Law on the Protection of Nations was enacted. It governed public relations regarding the status of secret organizations, Jewish people, their properties, as well as anti-national and suspicious activities during World War II. In August 1942, a decree imposed stricter measures on Jews, and the Commissariat for Jewish Affairs (KEV) was established under the direction of Aleksandar Belev. Bulgarian Jews were required to wear the yellow star, and their homes and businesses were marked with distinctive signs. On March 2, 1943, the Bulgarian government secretly authorized the deportation of 20,000 Jews. Jews in Sofia were ordered to leave the capital within three days. Jewish leaders reached out to King Boris III's secretary, and Ekaterina Karavelova, who promises to speak directly to the king.

Following the advice of Metropolitan Stefan, the chief rabbi, Dr. Hananel, took several delegates to Ekaterina Karavelova's home, where they jointly drafted a petition to the king. Ekaterina added a few words: "Sinko, you are a father, do no harm to anyone." The petition was signed by all, after which they went to Princess Eudoxia, papal vicar Monsignor Giuseppe Mazzoli, and Catholic priests close to Queen Joanna—known for her compassion toward Jews—to gather their support.

== Private life ==
She was married to Petko Karavelov, a prominent politician, leader of the Liberal Party, and four-time Prime Minister of Bulgaria. Together, they have three daughters: Rada (1880-1883), Viola (1884-1934), and Laura (1886-1913).

The lives of their children are marked by tragedy. Their eldest daughter, Rada, dies at the age of three from a prolonged illness. Viola, after the loss of her husband, falls into a deep depression and passes away in 1934. Laura tragically takes her own life following a troubled relationship with the poet Peyo Yavorov.

Viola marries journalist Joseph Herbst, who disappears after the Saint Nedelya Church bombing, likely being killed after his arrest. She loses her sanity and spends the remainder of her life in Karlukovo, where she dies in 1934.

Laura, on the other hand, is forced by her mother to marry Ivan Drenkov, a politician from the Democratic Party. They have two children: Kiril, who dies shortly after birth, and Petko, who is later raised by his grandmother. In 1912, Laura annuls her marriage to marry the poet Peyo Yavorov, whom she has secretly loved for years. Their marriage ends in tragedy two years later when Laura takes her own life by shooting herself in the chest. Devastated, Peyo Yavorov also attempts suicide. Although he survives the first attempt, he ultimately ends his life a few months later by repeating the act. Ekaterina, until her death, remained convinced that Yavorov killed her daughter.

== Death and legacy ==
Ekaterina Karavelova died on April 1, 1947, at the age of 87 in Sofia. She was buried behind the altar of the Saints Sedmochislenitsi Church, next to her husband, the prominent politician and statesman Petko Karavelov.

Karavelova Point in Antarctica is named after her.

== Honours and awards ==
Throughout her life, she was honored with several awards, including the Order "For Philanthropy", the Order "For Civil Merit" 1st class, the Silver Order "For Culture and Art", and two Red Cross medals, recognizing her tireless efforts and contributions.

- Holder of the Order "For Philanthropy"
- Order 'For Civil Merit' I degree
- Holder of the Order "For Culture and Art" - silver
- Commemorative Cross 'For the Independence of Bulgaria 1908
- Twice awarded the 'Red Cross' medal

== See also ==
- List of peace activists

== Sources ==
- Francisca de Haan, Krasimira Daskalova & Anna Loutfi: Biographical Dictionary of Women's Movements and Feminisms in Central, Easterna and South Eastern Europe, 19th and 20th centuries Central European University Press, 2006
