= Jeni Bojilova-Pateva =

Bulgarian activist (1878–1955)

- Born: Dzhenda Bozhilova; 1 December 1878; Gradets, Principality of Bulgaria
- Died: 17 June 1955 (aged 76); Sofia, People's Republic of Bulgaria
- Spouse: Ivan Patev
- Writing career
- Pen name: Jenny Bojilowa; Jenny Bojilova Pateff; Jenny Pateff; Zheni Bozhilova-Pateva; Zheni Pateva

Jeni Bojilova-Pateva, also transliterated as Zheni Bozhilova-Pateva, (Bulgarian: Жени Божилова-Патева; 1 December 1878 – 17 June 1955) was a Bulgarian teacher, writer, women's rights activist, and suffragist, who became involved in the pacifist movement. After graduating with teaching credentials in 1893, she began her profession, but was barred from teaching when a law was passed in 1898 that limited the rights of married women. She turned to activism and journalism, becoming involved in the international women's movement that year. A highly prominent feminist, she was one of the founders of the Bulgarian Women's Union in 1901. During 1905 in Burgas, she founded "Self-Awareness", a feminist group, and served as its chair for 25 years. As editor of the Women's Voice she published articles on developments in the women's movement in Bulgaria and abroad, as well as about issues affecting women. Throughout her career, she published over 500 articles and books.

A believer in women's suffrage, Pateva participated in numerous international conferences and frequently served as speaker at congresses. Her book, В помощ на жената (To Help Women), written in 1908, became foundational to the ideology of the Bulgarian Women's Union, laying out reforms needed to adapt policies affecting women and children. When the Women's International League for Peace and Freedom was founded in 1915, she became a prominent member of the pacifist movement. In 1944, when state socialism was established in Bulgaria, women gained the right to vote, but the league was among many grassroots organizations that were abolished. When Pateva asked for permission to open a cultural and educational society in 1945, she was branded an enemy of the people. Two years later, her protests over the death penalty and the sentencing of Nikola Petkov resulted in her home and her son's factory being nationalized, leaving them penniless.

== Early life ==
Dzhenda Bozhilova, as she was baptized, was born on 1 December 1878, in Gradets, in the Principality of Bulgaria to Genka Andreeva and Dimov Bozhil. Her father, a veteran of the Russo-Turkish War, was a tailor and cattle breeder, who advocated strongly for education. Bozhilova completed primary school in Gradets and then attended secondary school in Sliven. She went on to further her education at the "Nanchovo" Municipal Gymnasium, being graduated in 1893 with teaching qualifications.

== Career ==
=== Teaching ===
The following year, Bozhilova began her teaching career at a school in Karnobat. In 1896, she moved to Razgrad, taking a post at the girls school. In 1897, she married Ivan Georgiev Patev, who was from her hometown and also a teacher. As they had an egalitarian marriage, Pateva and Patev agreed to help each other in their goals to attain higher education. He went abroad to study in Geneva and returned in 1899. While he was away, Pateva supported him from her earnings. When Patev returned with a doctorate in law, he supported Pateva, as she went abroad to study in 1901. She began her studies in Berlin and Jena and, in 1902, took courses in Paris, studying philosophy and sociology, as well as German, French, and Russian. Although she did not complete a degree, Pateva returned to Bulgaria in 1903, influenced by the international women's movement while away. The couple settled in Burgas and had three children during the next 16 years: Luben (known as "Leo", born 1904), Bozhan (born 1905), and Lilian (known as "Lily", born 1913).

=== Women's rights activism (1898–1908) ===
Pateva began her political involvement in public affairs when a law was passed by the Bulgarian National Assembly on 18 December 1898, which barred married women from engaging in the teaching profession. In protest, she wrote Отворено Писмо (Open Letter), addressing it to all the teachers in the principality and advising them to oppose the law's legitimacy. To unite women behind the cause and promote them working on other issues facing women and children, Pateva, along with Anna Karima and Julia Malinova, began organizing and, in 1901, co-founded the umbrella organization, the Bulgarian Women's Union, the first national women's organization in Bulgaria. Karima was the first chair of the organization and Pateva served on the board of directors. Despite pressure from women's groups and teachers, the law remained in effect until 1904.

In 1901, Pateva began lecturing as an orator for the international women's movement for the group, Милосърдие (Charity), in Burgas and, in 1902, went to Yambol to help with the reorganization of the Развитие (Development) group. In 1903, she was elected chair of Милосърдие, but because members of the association did not want to join the Bulgarian Women's Union or expand their focus from charitable deeds, she resigned and withdrew from the organization. That year, the Women's Union faced a crisis when Karima and Malinova became embroiled in a serious dispute that eventually split the organization. Their position was that all women had similar concerns and that the goals of the union should represent them without regard to class or party. The other faction, led by Blagoeva and Konova, took the view that the union should be proletarianized and membership should be drawn from the working class. Pateva wrote a book about the problems, Разногласия в Българския женски съюз (Disagreement in the Bulgarian Women's Union), which was published in 1903. She also began writing for Женски глас (Women's Voice), a newspaper for which in 1904, she became an editor.

Along with Penka Russeva-Belmustakova and Yordanka Guszova, in 1904, Pateva founded an educational group for women to attend language and literacy courses and to organize programs to improve access to professional and university study for women. They formalized the organization as, Самосъзнание (Self-Awareness), the following year, as an educational and charitable society and aligned it under the Bulgarian Women's Union, with Pateva designated as its chair. In the spring of 1905, she attended the Women's Union's Congress, held in Sofia and was tasked with using her position as editor of Женски глас to publish articles about the umbrella organization, soon to become their official media outlet. From 1907, Самосъзнание began offering general education courses, classes on tailoring and other trades, and running a sewing class for the Women's Labor Office. The year 1907 also saw women's suffrage become one of the official aims of the Bulgarian Women's Union.

In 1908, Pateva represented Bulgarian Women's Union at the Fourth Congress of the International Woman Suffrage Alliance (IWSA) in Amsterdam. She strongly petitioned for the acceptance of the Women's Union as a member of the IWSA, gaining approval from those who voted on it. In 1909, she published an article in the newspaper Ден (Day) arguing for women's emancipation and the next year, when the editorial offices of Женски глас moved to Sofia, she retained her position as editor. Also in 1908, Pateva published a second book, В помощ на жената (To Help Women), in which she called for a broad range of reforms. She recommended laws for the protection of children and women laborers, as well as maternity guidelines; for the creation of social institutions by the state that provided food, shelter, and nursery facilities for children of working women; policies against alcohol abuse and prostitution; for the protection of illegitimate children; and for social welfare laws that protected orphans, the infirm, and the unemployed. She insisted that women should be allowed an education and participation in public life so that they could take care of themselves and their families, have professions, and gain independence and self-esteem as citizens. The book became the backbone of the Bulgarian Women's Union's ideology.

=== Women's rights and peace activism (1911–1924) ===
Pateva spoke at the Sixth Congress of the IWSA that was hosted in Stockholm in 1911 and she wrote a report on the proceedings for the newspaper Утро (Utro), arguing for women's full equality in all areas of public life. During the Balkan Wars (1912–1913) she published Апел към балканските жени (Appeal to the Balkan Women), urging women to try to achieve peace. At the start of World War I, Pateva initiated programs to support prisoners of war and their families, including a movement to sew underwear for soldiers. Even though the activities of the Women's Union were suspended during most of the conflict, she traveled throughout Europe participating in women's conferences and sharing her vision of humanism and non-violence, arguing for women's participation in negotiating world peace. She spoke at the Special International Congress of Women held in 1915 in The Hague, in which the Women's International League for Peace and Freedom (WILPF) was founded, urging disarmament and presenting a plan for reconstruction of war-ravaged nations. Returning to Bulgaria, in 1918, Pateva founded the national branch of WILPF in Burgas, and in the May, organized a conference together with Malinova and Victoria Angelova to reactivate the Bulgarian Women's Union. The following year, along with other members of the group, she wrote a protest letter to American President Woodrow Wilson calling for the lifting of the isolation imposed on the Central Powers by the Treaty of Neuilly-sur-Seine.

As an official representative of the Government of Aleksandar Stamboliyski, Pateva took part in the International Council of Women (ICW)'s congress held in Kristiania, Norway in 1920, presenting in French, her paper Положението на жената и детето в България (The Situation of Woman and Child in Bulgaria). In 1922, she attended the Special Congress of the ICW held in The Hague, making a speech about the perils of war and reiterating the need for total disarmament and cooperation among people to develop a culture of brotherhood, freedom, and self-determination. She made a statement about the political rights of women at the Ninth Congress of the IWSA that was hosted in Rome during 1923. That year, when martial law was declared in response to a coup d'état in Bulgaria and the legislature passed a law in favor of capital punishment, she publicly spoke against the policy and wrote articles urging women to oppose the legislation, becoming one of the first to challenge the law. She reiterated her views at the nineteenth Convention of the Bulgarian Women's Union, imploring mothers, who knew the pain of giving birth and raising children, to stand against murder of human life, war, and the death penalty.

=== Later career (1925–1945) ===
In 1925, after 20 years as the chair of Самосъзнание, Pateva resigned over the ideological stance that members and the parent Bulgarian Women's Union had taken to support the dictatorial fascist regime of Aleksandar Tsankov and his white terror policies against intellectuals and political opponents. The following year, she organized the Женско миротворно общество в България (Women's Peace Society in Bulgaria), which she chaired until 1944. The organization actively opposed exile and repression by authorities. During the next decades, she worked at writing articles for the Вестник на жената (Women's Journal) and attending women's and peace conferences. She attended the Tenth Congress of the IWSA held in Paris in May 1926 and in July was in Dublin to attend the WILPF Congress. In 1927 Pateva spoke at the International League for Women for Peace and Liberty meeting in Gland, Switzerland and attended the International Federation of University Women Conference in Geneva in 1929; the Belgrade Peace Conference in May 1931; the War Resisters' International conference in Lyon in August 1931; the Universal Peace Congress hosted in Paris in 1937; and both in 1939 and 1940, she attended events in Rotterdam.

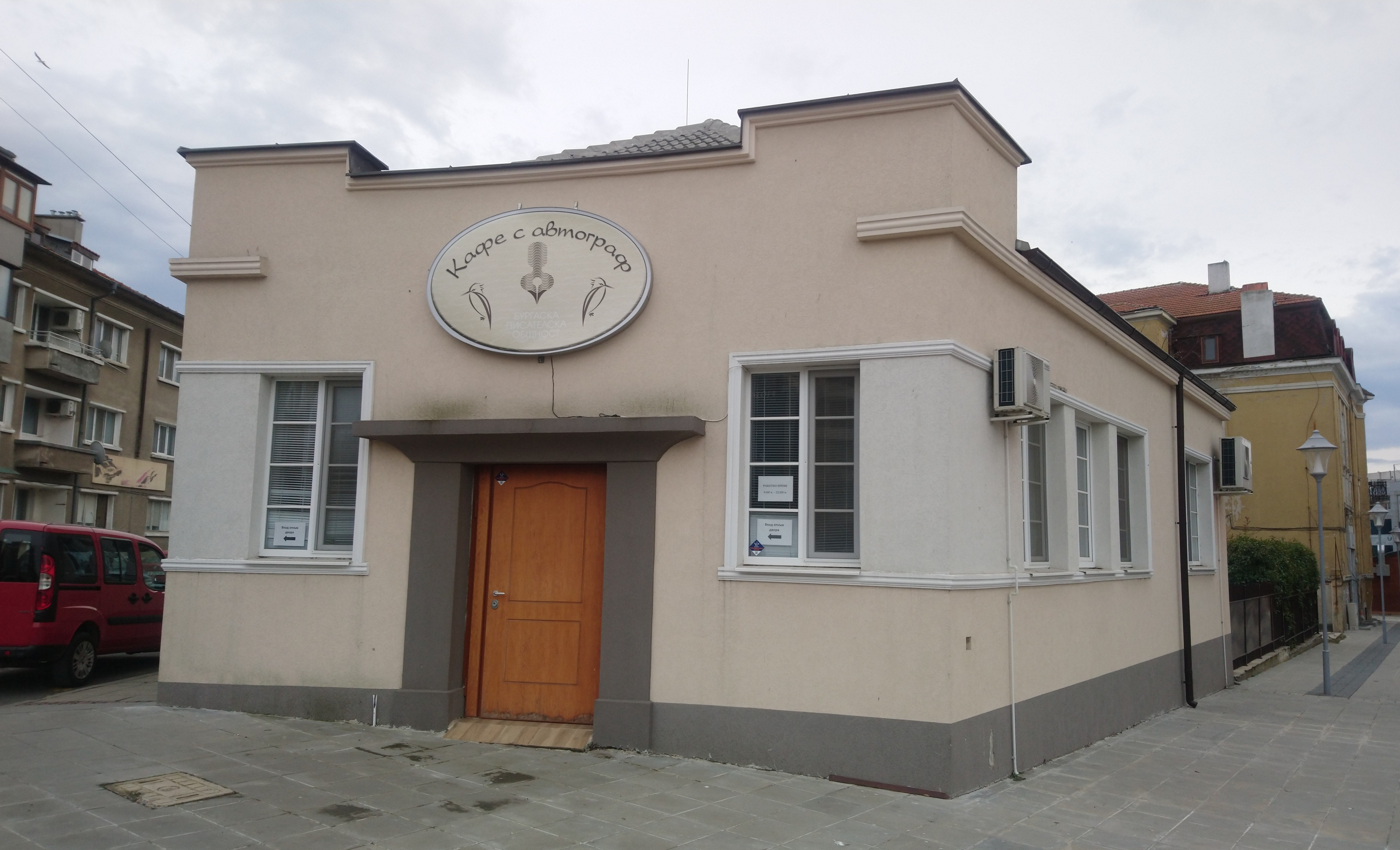
Writers' House, Burgas

Throughout her career, Pateva spoke at more than 100 public lectures and published approximately 500 articles and books on the topics of women's rights, pacifism, and vegetarianism, to which she adhered. In 1931, she was awarded an honorary membership in the French branch of the Union internationale des écrivains révolutionnaires (International Union of Revolutionary Writers). Her home was a gathering place for prominent Bulgarian public figures and intellectuals, including Alexander Balabanov, Adriana Budevska, Petko Rosen, Nikola Sakarov, Aleksandar Stamboliyski, Naycho Tsanov, and Asen Zlatarov. In 1944, a second coup d'état brought in a communist regime, which implemented state socialism, giving women the vote, yet simultaneously abolishing women's and other grassroots organizations.

In 1945, Pateva approached the Minister of National Education and Culture asking for permission to form the Свободно народно прогресивно културно огнище Самосъзнание (Free People's Progressive Cultural Center of Self-Knowledge). She stated that the intent of the self-supporting organization would be to provide women and youth opportunities to improve their talents and develop skills to engage in cultural activities that would benefit the Bulgarian people. Her request was denied and the authorities declared the Patev family enemies of the people for their wealth and status as part of the Burgas elite. In 1947, when Nikola Petkov's death sentence was announced, Pateva sent correspondence to Georgi Dimitrov and Vasil Kolarov, demanding that the legislature abolish the death penalty. The letter produced dire consequences when both her home and her son Bozhan's factory were nationalized. Left without means of support, she wrote the government asking for a pension, which was denied.

== Death and legacy ==
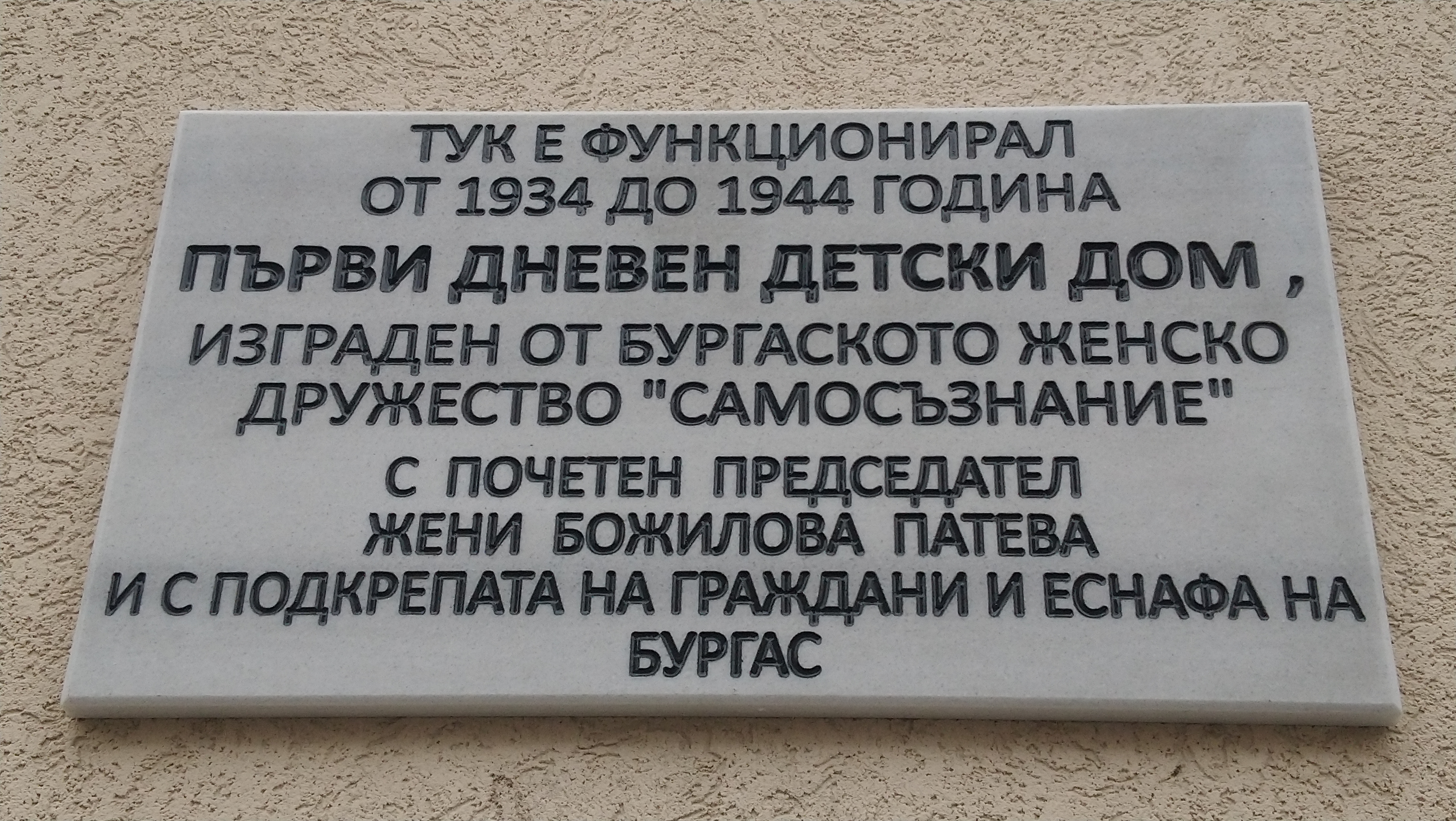
Memorial plaque to Pateva at the Writers' House

Pateva died penniless on 17 June 1955 in Sofia. In 1994, the women's organization she had founded and chaired for 20 years, Самосъзнание, was revived. In 2016, the Burgas Writers' House was adorned with a plaque honoring her. She is remembered, along with Anna Karima, as one of the two "most prominent leaders of the women's movement" in their era, according to historian, Krassimira Daskalova.
