= Kina Konova =

Bulgarian educator, translator, publicist, suffragist and women's rights activist

Kina Konova (Bulgarian: Кина Конова) (Sevlievo, September 1872- Sofia, 2 May 1952), born Kina Mutafova, was a Bulgarian educator, translator, publicist, suffragist and women's rights activist. She was a co-founder and leader of the first local women's socialist organization in Bulgaria, the Society of Friends. Women's Branch (1889), and she was a founder of the local women's society Nadezhda (hope) in 1897.

== Life ==
Active as a teacher, Kinova was an early participant in the debate about women's education and the status of female teachers. In 1901, she was a co-founder of the Bulgarian Women's Union alongside Vela Blagoeva, Ekaterina Karavelova, Anna Karima and Julia Malinova. The organization was an umbrella organization of the 27 local women's organisations that had been established in Bulgaria since 1878. The Bulgarian Women's Union was founded to increase access for women to education and entry of women into universities in the 1890s. To promote and encourage women's political development and increase participation in public affairs, the Bulgarian Women's Union arranged national congresses and used the newspaper Zhenski glas (Women's Voice) as its organ.
