= Malinova =

Malinova may refer to:

- Malinová (Rakovník District), Czech Republic
- Maļinova, Latvia
  - Maļinova Parish
- Malinová, Slovakia
- Feminine form of the Bulgarian surname Malinov
