= Malinov =

Malinov (Bulgarian: Малинов), feminine: Malinova is a Bulgarian surname. Notable people with the surname include:

- Aleksandar Malinov (1867–1938), Bulgarian politician and Prime Minister of Bulgaria
- Dara Malinova, Bulgarian rhythmic gymnast
- Julia Malinova, Bulgarian suffragist and women's rights activist
- Kristiyan Malinov (born 1994), Bulgarian footballer
- Ofelia Malinov (born 1996), Italian volleyball player of Bulgarian descent
- Petar Malinov (born 1970), Bulgarian footballer
- Svetoslav Malinov (born 1968), Bulgarian politician
