= Praskovya Frantsevna Kudelli =

Russian revolutionary

- Прасковья Францевна Куделли
- Born: October 26, 1859; Krasnodar, Russia
- Died: May 26, 1944 (aged 84); Leningrad, Russia
- Occupation: Revolutionary
- Political party: CPSU
- Awards: Order of Lenin

Praskovya Frantsevna Kudelli (October 26, 1859 – May 26, 1944) was a Russian publicist, educator, and revolutionary.

== Early life ==
Praskovya Frantsevna Kudelli was born on October 26, 1859, in Ekaterinodar, now Krasnodar, Russia to a physician's family and raised her in her stepfather's household, who was a nobleman and colonel. She was educated at Kerch Institute for Noble Maidens and later graduated from the Higher Women's (Bestuzhev) Courses in Saint Petersburg.

== Revolutionary career ==
In 1878, while attending the Bestuzhev courses, she started participating in the student revolutionary movement and aligned herself with the Narodniks. Students in these circles read the journals Narodnaya Volya and Vestnik Narodnoy Voli. Kudelli recalled that a dissatisfaction with the existing order and sense of impending revolution took root during this time.

Between 1893 and 1895, she was introduced to Marxist theory; she followed debates between the Narodniks and Marxists, read the pamphlet, "Who are the "Friends of the People?", and contributed to the journals Zhizn, Mir Bozhy, and a number of children's magazines. From 1893, she started teaching at an evening Sunday school along with Nadezhda Krupskaya and Lydia Mikhailovna Knipovich. Through Krupskaya, she met Vladimir Lenin, who sat in on one of her classes. Ivan Babushkin also attended her classes.

In 1896, Kudelli was interrogated by police following the Narodnaya Volya printing press incident known as the "Lakhta Affair." In 1897, after M.F. Vetrova self-immolated while imprisoned in the Peter and Paul Fortress, Kudelli wrote a pamphlet expressing her indignation and fervor titled In Memory of M.F Vetrova. In 1901, she began sending reports to Iskra after connecting with a local group of Social Democrats.

After her exile ended, she travelled to London, Lausanne, and Geneva to attend Marxist lectures, meetings, and study circles and returned four months later to Saint Petersburg with a strengthened Marxist worldview. In 1902, she became involved with a propaganda group where she led a study circle; her work was interrupted by an accidental arrest, and she spent five months in a detention center before being exiled to Tver. There she joined the Tver Committee of the RSDLP and engaged in propaganda propagation by writing leaflets and teaching lectures.

In 1903, she joined the Bolshevik Party. In September 1903, she was arrested again and spent four months in prison. She was exiled from many cities within Russia, so she chose to live in Tula to continue her political work and joined the Tula Committee of the RSDLP. In 1905, she was sent as a delegate to the Tammerfors Conference but was unable to return to Tula due to impending arrest, so she stayed in Saint Petersburg to work as a propagandist and organizer. She was eventually elected as a member of the Saint Petersburg Committee of the Bolsheviks and in 1906 she directed the campaign for elections to the State Duma on the Petersburg Side.

She participated in the Russian Revolution of 1905. She was a delegate to the Tammerfors Party Conference in December 1905 and was a member of the Saint Petersburg Committee of the Bolsheviks in 1906.

== Death and legacy ==
Kudelli died on May 26, 1944, in Leningrad, Russia. Her grave lies within the communist section at Serafimovskoe Cemetery in the Novaya Derevnya district of Leningrad. A pink marble obelisk marks her grave and bears the inscription, "To the oldest member of the All-Union Communist Party (Bolsheviks)."

A marble memorial plaque was installed on the facade of the building which housed the Bestuzhev courses, recognizing Kudelli and five other women who were participants in the Revolutionary movement in Russia. This plaque reads:

From 1885 to 1918, the Higher Women's (Bestuzhev) Courses were located here, where N. K. Krupskaya, A. I. Ulyanova, O. I. Ulyanova, K. N. Samoylova, P. F. Kudelli, L. A. Fotieva and other prominent participants of the revolutionary movement in Russia studied.

Praskovya Kudelli's grave (front)

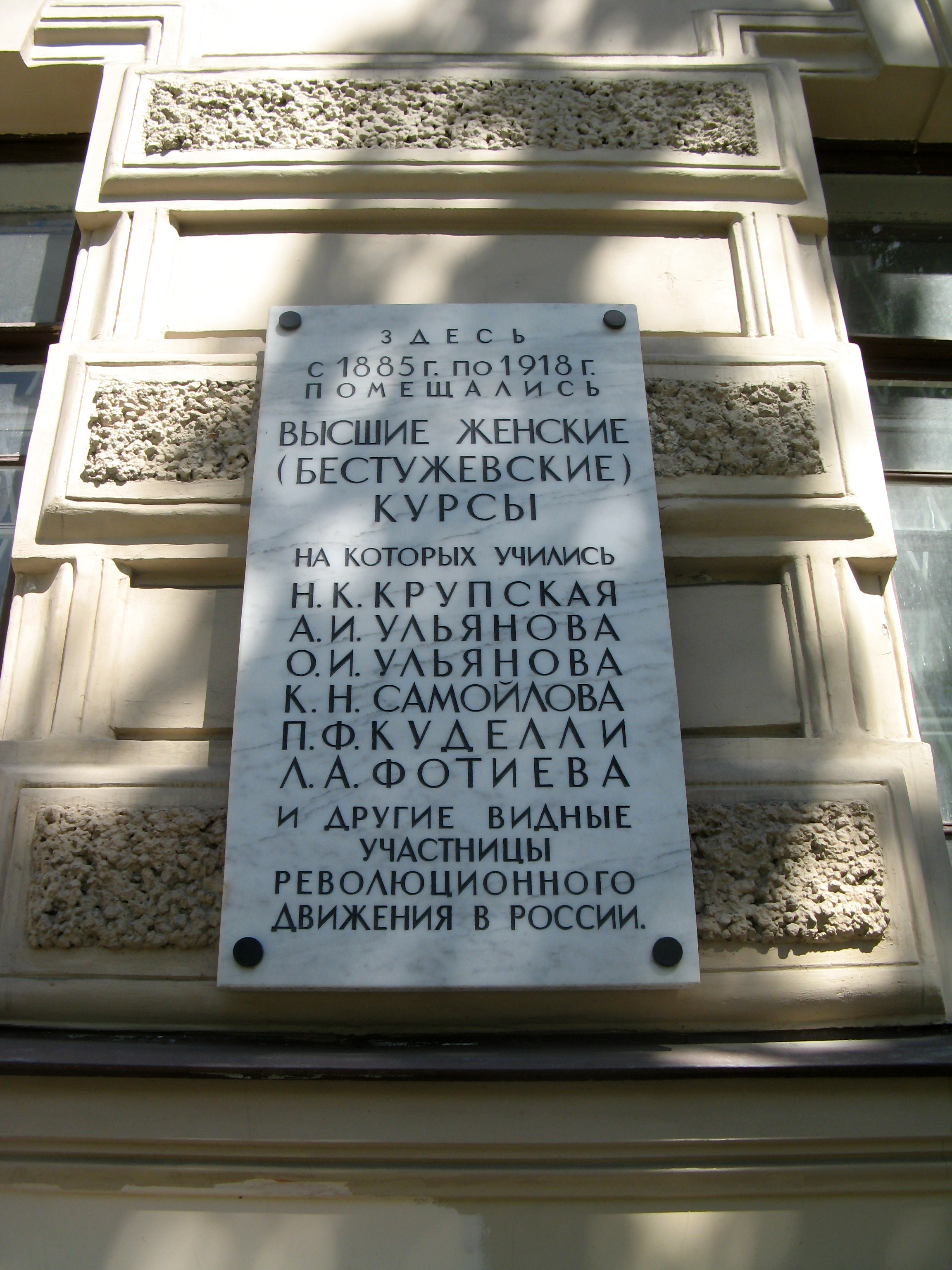
Memorial plaque for prominent members who attended the Bestuzhev courses

Praskovya Kudelli's grave (side)

== Bibliography ==
In Memory of M.F. Vetrova (1897)
