= Bulgarian Union of Progressive Women =

The Bulgarian Union of Progressive Women was a feminist political organization, founded in Bulgaria in 1908. The union was founded by Bulgarian feminists including Anna Karima, Maria Dzhidrova, and Sanda Iovcheva. These women were originally founders of the Bulgarian Women’s Union, but their dissatisfaction with the union led them to create the Union of Progressive Women. The union was a progressive movement with the ultimate goal of Bulgarian women's suffrage.

== Background ==
In 1878 Bulgaria was liberated from Ottoman rule and became an independent state with a constitutional monarchy. When this nation-state building began women’s rights and education emerged as an interest, as it had in Western Europe. This interest and discourse over women’s rights led to the formation of many different unions. However, it wasn’t until 1901 that a coalition of 27 different unions would become the Bulgarian Women’s Union. The Bulgarian Women’s Union quickly came under attack by working-class women influenced by socialist ideals brought to Bulgaria by August Bebel and Clara Zetkin. They criticized the union for only appealing to the interests of bourgeois women, and not thinking about the fact that working women would not be equal to bourgeois women, even if women gained the right to vote. This coupled with the fact that not every woman in the Bulgarian Women’s Union was actively working towards the goal of women's suffrage led to the creation of a counterpart union. In 1908 another group of progressive Bulgarian women decided to form a separate organization, known as the Union Ravnopravie or Bulgarian Union of Progressive Women." Many of the founders of the Bulgarian Union of Progressive Women, such as Anna Karima, Maria Dzhidrova, and Sanda Iovchena, had also participated in creating the Bulgarian Women's Union. The Bulgarian Union of Progressive Women initially generated much controversy as one of the motivating factors behind its formation was general dissatisfaction with the direction in which the Bulgarian Women's Union was moving towards.

== Ideological foundations and goals ==
The Bulgarian Union of Progressive Women was formed as an offshoot of the Bulgarian Women's Union, with a focus on women’s rights and direct political action. The Bulgarian Women's Union had historically focused their efforts through charity and philanthropy work, with little success achieving lawful change. Anna Karima and her fellow leaders stressed they were not splitting from the Bulgarian Women’s Union. Rather, they were looking to complement and supplement the Union's efforts by focusing on women’s rights and political action. The Bulgarian Union of Progressive Women was formed on the foundations of equal rights for women, the ability to express their opinions freely, and the ability to exercise their will in government affairs.Karima stated that according to Bulgarian law, women are "lumped in with the worst criminals, the mentally disabled, and minors." In 1909, the Bulgarian Union of Progressive Women petitioned Parliament to amend the electoral laws and allow all women to vote. During this time, Bulgarian law dictated that all Bulgarian citizens could vote. However, citizens were traditionally and customarily considered male, this tradition barred women from exercising a vote. This meant that the union was petitioning for cultural emancipation and not a legal one. A core principle of the union was that they would pursue this change within the society they operated in, instead of creating a whole new one. They stressed that the union had no intention of tearing apart the family. Instead, the goal of their movement was to help facilitate cooperation between husband and wife by making them equals. Equality within the home was the first step towards achieving equal rights for all classes and people.

== Activities and influence ==
The Bulgarian Union of Progressive Women fought an uphill battle for women's rights but managed to make changes, specifically in advancing women's education and professional development. The organization raised financial support for female vocational schools. This support was critical in breaking gender barriers in education and the workforce. They also spoke out against domestic violence and for equal pay, although they did not achieve legislative victories in these areas. Internationally, the Bulgarian Union of Progressive Women made its mark by representing Bulgarian women at global forums. Their international presence allowed for exchanging ideas and strategies with other global women's organizations, broadening the Union's impact and influence.

The Union's activities and ideologies were also reflected in their periodical publications. Publication of its own periodical Zhenski glas (Women's Voice) played a crucial role in disseminating feminist ideologies and engaging in public discourse.

== The Union's legacy ==
The Union continued their demands for women's suffrage, and in 1937, the Bulgarian Parliament passed a new election law redefining who was considered a citizen and who could vote. The new legislation provided the right to vote to married, divorced, or widowed women over the age of 21; although suffrage was limited, the Union had achieved their first victory.

The communist rise to power in 1944 replaced Bulgaria's women's unions. According to Krassimira Daskalova, "Women were granted full equality with men" following the establishment of communism in Bulgaria. Anna Karima, a cofounder of both unions, published a book that praised Soviet Russia's liberation of women. The Bulgarian National Women's Union a part of the communist party, replaced the existing unions.
