= Women in Bulgaria =

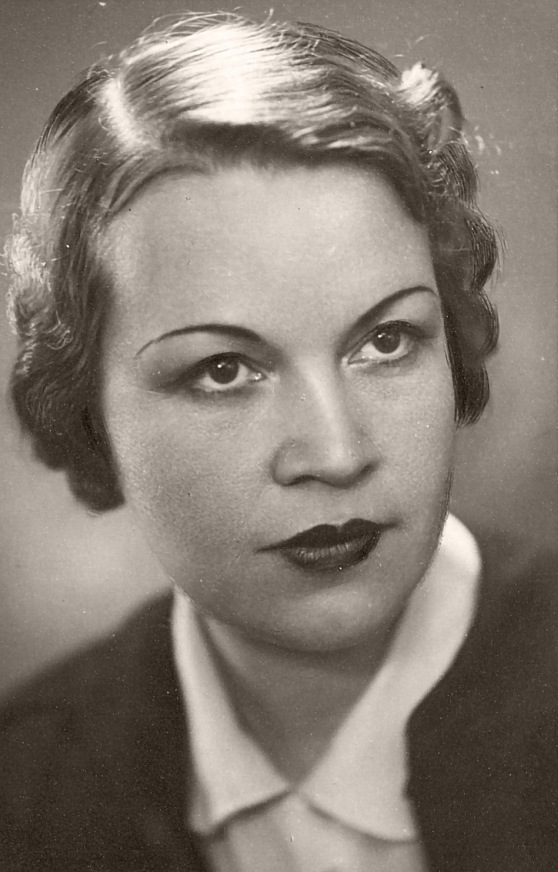
- Elisaveta Bagriana, Bulgarian poet and three time Nobel prize nominee (1893-1991)

General statistics
- Maternal mortality (per 100,000): 7 (2020)
- Women in parliament: 25.8% (2019)
- Women over 25 with secondary education: 90.9% (2010)
- Women in labour force: 58.2% (employment rate)

Gender Inequality Index
- Value: 0.210 (2021)
- Rank: 52nd out of 191

Global Gender Gap Index
- Value: 0.706 (2025)
- Rank: 83rd out of 148

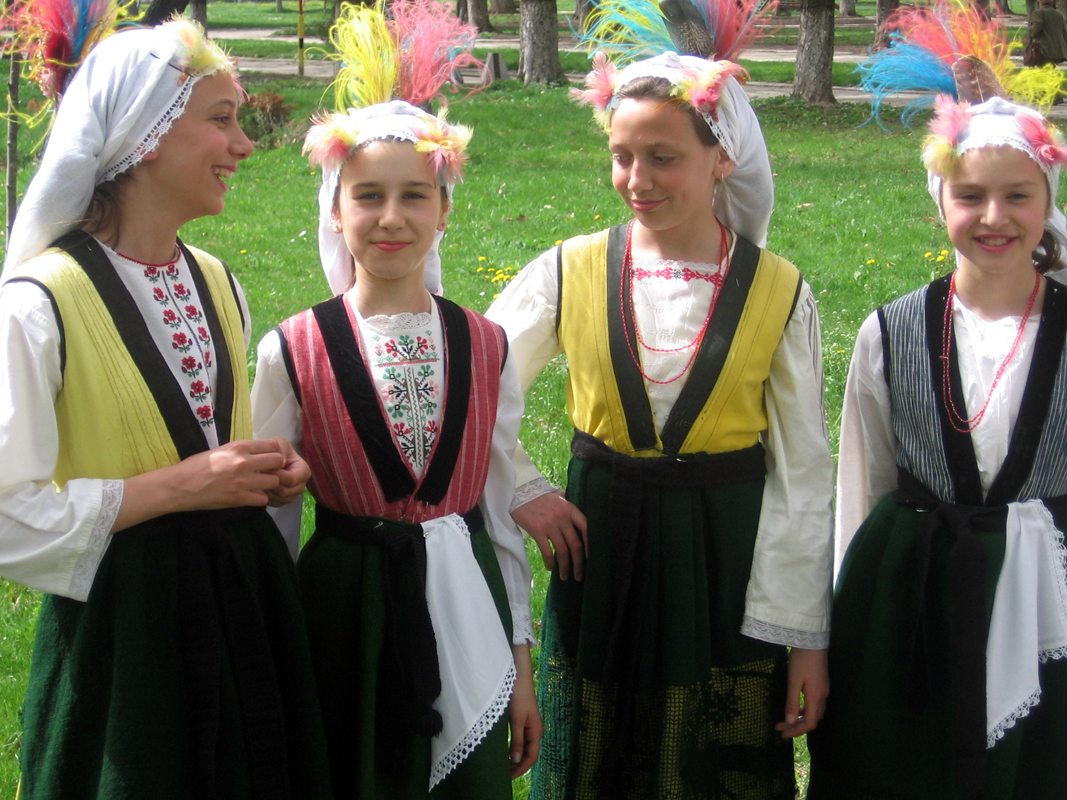
Bulgarian girls from Gabra, Sofia Province in traditional attire

Women in Bulgaria refers to women who live in and are from Bulgaria. Women's position in Bulgarian society has been influenced by a variety of cultures and ideologies, including the Byzantine and Ottoman cultures, Eastern Orthodox Christianity, communist ideology, and contemporary globalized Western values.

== Emancipation ==
While Bulgaria is often described as a patriarchal society, women do have substantial authority in household budgeting or agricultural decision making. Both men and women have the right to vote and own property. Women remain responsible for most household chores and represent more than half the registered unemployed. Vesna Nikolić-Ristanović points out how at women made up two thirds of the unpaid workers present in Bulgaria during the 1990s. They also occupy public and private leadership positions less frequently than men. In 1996, fewer than 14 percent of post-socialist parliamentary representatives have been women, and only one in five municipal councilors were women in that year. By 2019, women represented 25.8% of the Parliament.

== Voting and government ==
Limited women's suffrage was first granted in 1937, and women obtained full voting rights in 1944. During the communist era, civil rights and freedoms for both women and men were equal, no matter how limited they were due to the authoritarian nature of the government. In 1945 the first women were elected to parliament. Between 1960 and 1990 the number of women in parliament varied between 16% and 21% and in 1990 it dropped down to 8.5%. As of 2017, there were 25.8% women in parliament.

== Employment ==
Many women entered paid employment during the socialist era, when an ideology of gender equality was promoted, and they made up nearly half the workforce in the late twentieth century. Women are frequently employed as teachers, nurses, pharmacists, dentists, software developers, and in human resources, public administration, law, and as notaries. In 2016, Bulgaria ranked number one in the world in representation of women in the IT sector. Women are also largely responsible for household tasks—child care, cooking, cleaning, and shopping. Agricultural labor is divided according to gender, with men working with animals and machinery and women doing more hand labor in crop production, although flexibility exists in response to specific situations.

Mariya Stoilova found that women's economic activity in post-socialist Bulgaria was most affected by the age of the women, with older women who were in employment during the socialist system having the lowest rate of economic activity in post-socialist Bulgaria, and while younger women still faced sexist discrimination in employment opportunities, they were more economically active than older age groups of women. Despite this, the gender segregation in the workforce is somewhat less pronounced in Bulgaria than in other European countries. Compared to the European average, Bulgarian women have a higher involvement in traditionally male fields such as science, maths, computing and engineering; and a lower involvement in the service field. Also, the gender pay gap (in 2013) is 13.0% in Bulgaria, which is lower than the European Union average of 16.2%.

As of 2014, the employment rate (age 15–64) for women was 58.2% while for men it was 63.9%. However, in 2023 only 44% of the unemployed are women (compared to 56% for men). The employment rate for both sexes has been relatively low during the past two decades, due to hardships experienced by the national economy after the fall of the communism. Nevertheless, the exact involvement in the labour force is quite difficult to determine, due to the presence of the unregulated informal sector. According to World Bank, women in 2014 made up 46.6% of the total labour force, pretty much the same as in 1990 (47.9%). Bulgarian women's strong involvement in the economy can be seen in the fact that almost all employed women work full-time - the highest percentage among employed women in the EU.

Before the communist era, Bulgaria (like other Eastern European countries) was a largely rural agricultural society, with women being integrated in the rural agricultural work. As such, they occupied a relatively high status in society (although not equal to men). Under the communist regime, the country was industrialized and "modernized", and people came from rural areas to urban areas. The communist new ideology and economy integrated women in paid employment - in the late 1970s, Bulgaria had the highest percentage of working women in the world. Women were integrated in almost all fields, including science and medicine, nevertheless they were strictly under the control of the state, were educated to be submissive to the state authorities (who were mostly male), and had very little power of self-expression. The fall of the communist had mixed results for women: while their economic security was affected (although this affected men too - as both men and women lost, in large numbers, their state-guaranteed jobs), women got the newly discovered freedom to open business, freely pursue artistic and cultural activities, and have freedom of speech.

While the newly emerging, 'wild', unrestricted capitalism of the 1990s was often hostile to women, many women have, in fact, succeeded: one-third of company owners and top managers in Bulgaria are women. The high involvement of women in business is common to countries in the Eastern European region: "Overall, Eastern Europe continues to top the rankings in gender equality, with 35 percent of senior roles in the region held by women and just 16 percent of businesses with no women in senior management", according to a 2007 study.

== Education ==
The literacy rate is slightly lower for women compared to men: the literacy rate is 98.1% for females, while for males it is 98.7% (aged 15 or older, data from 2015). Illiteracy is particularly high among Roma women, as well as, Roma men.

== Constitutional rights ==
The Constitution of Bulgaria provides for gender equality: Art. 6.(1) All persons are born free and equal in dignity and rights. (2) All citizens shall be equal before the law. There shall be no privileges or restriction of rights on the grounds of race, national or social origin, ethnic self-identity, sex, religion, education, opinion, political affiliation, personal or social status or property status".

== International obligations ==
Being part of the European Union (since 2007), Bulgaria is subject to its directives. Bulgaria is also a party to CEDAW. Bulgaria has ratified the Council of Europe Convention on Action against Trafficking in Human Beings in 2007.

== Anti-discrimination laws ==
Discrimination is legally prohibited. The Protection Against Discrimination Act (2004) is Bulgaria's main anti-discrimination law. At Article 4 it states: "Any direct or indirect discrimination on grounds of gender, race, nationality, ethnicity, human genome, citizenship, origin, religion or belief, education, convictions, political affiliation, personal or social status, disability, age, sexual orientation, marital status, property status, or on any other grounds established by law or by an international treaty to which the Republic of Bulgaria is a party, shall be banned."

== Property inheritance ==
Women and men have equal legal rights. Both men and women own property such as land, buildings, and animals, and inheritance is partible (i.e., property is divided among all heirs rather than going to a single heir). In practice, some heirs may be disinherited or may receive more land than their siblings, and daughters traditionally inherited less land than sons. The latter was sometimes explained in terms of the often large dowries of household goods and sometimes land or livestock that women traditionally took into marriage. Houses were traditionally often inherited by youngest sons, who brought their wives to live in the family home.

== Reproductive rights and health ==
The maternal mortality rate in Bulgaria was 7 deaths/100,000 live births in 2020, down from 11 deaths/100,000 live births in 2010. The total fertility rate (TFR) in Bulgaria is 1.45 children born/woman (2015 estimates), which is below the replacement rate, and one of the lowest in the world. Abortion in Bulgaria is legal on request during the first 12 weeks of pregnancy, and at later stages for medical reasons.

== Marriage and family life ==
While marriage was traditionally very important in Bulgaria, there has been a rapid increase in unmarried cohabitation after the fall of communism. The transition from communism to market economy had a great impact on the demographic behavior of the population. After the fall of communism, the legal and social pressure to get married has declined, and the population has started to experience new life styles. As of 2014, 58.8% of children were born to unmarried mothers. In the European Values Study (EVS) of 2008, the percentage of Bulgarian respondents who agreed with the assertion that "Marriage is an outdated institution" was 27.2%. A new Family Code came into effect in 2009, modernizing family law. Legally, Bulgaria has long recognized the equality of men and women in family law. This is explicitly stipulated in the Family Code, Art 2, which defines seven principles of family relations, one of which is "equality between the man and the woman". This is reinforced at Art 13, titled, "Equality between spouses" which states: "The spouses shall have equal rights and obligations in the matrimony." Despite legal equality, societal norms of the Balkan culture often consider the wife to be in a position of subordination to the husband.

In terms of maternity leave, from the beginning of the 1970s women in Bulgaria enjoyed two years of paid leave and one year of unpaid leave. In the early 1990s it was reduced to one year paid leave and one year unpaid leave.

== Violence against women ==
Bulgaria is part of the paradox of many Eastern European societies: a long tradition of involvement of women in public working life, and high professional status for women; but at the same time leniency towards domestic violence. A 1996 report stated: "Society recognizes women's intellectual abilities. For fifty years now, women constitute half of the labour force in the country. The situation in the family is different. The relationship model is a patriarchal one."

In the 21st century, with the entry in the EU, Bulgaria has revised its policy on family violence, particularly by enacting its first domestic violence law, the 2005 Protection against Domestic Violence Act. In 2015, Bulgaria repealed Article 158 of the Penal Code, which stated that a perpetrator of several sexual offences could escape prosecution by marrying the victim.

== Women's movement ==
In the 19th century, small local women's groups started to form in Bulgaria. The women's movement was united and organized in the Bulgarian Women's Union in 1901, which campaigned for equal rights, among them women's suffrage, which was partially obtained in 1937. With the Communist take over in 1944, the women's movement was placed under government control through the state organization Bulgarian National Women's Union, and equal rights between men and women were introduced in law. An independent women's movement again resurfaced after 1989.

== See also ==
- Women of medieval Bulgaria
- Gender roles in post-communist Central and Eastern Europe
- Women in Europe
