= Monica Chintu =

Zambian politician

- Citizenship: Zambian
- Occupation: Politician
- Known for: Being one of Zambia's first female politicians, serving two terms as a Member of Parliament, and her activism in the Women's Brigade of the United National Independence Party (UNIP).
- Awards: Companion Order of Freedom, first division, awarded by President Michael Sata in 2014.

Monica Nanyangwe Chintu is a Zambian politician, one of Zambia's first female politicians.

== Life ==
Before entering Parliament, Chintu was active in the Women's Brigade of the United National Independence Party (UNIP). She served two terms in Parliament as an MP. She was returned UNIP Member of Parliament for Mbala North in the 1968 election, where she was the only elected woman MP. There she spoke out against the low level of women's representation in UNIP and in government. In the 1973 election she was returned as MP for Senga Hill.

When a Women's Brigade hierarchy was established in 1974, Chintu was elected to serve as its vice-Secretary. She was a member of the 1976 Women's Council of Zambia, drawing up a programme of action for the UN Decade for Women. As deputy for B. C. Kankasa in the UNIP Women's League, Chintu attended the first seminar organized by the Committee of the Bulgarian Women's Movement (CBWM) after the Second World Conference on Women in Copenhagen in 1980.

In 2014 President Michael Sata awarded Chintu the Companion Order of Freedom, first division.
