= Fourth Conference of the International Woman Suffrage Alliance =

Feminist conference held in Amsterdam, June 1908

Fourth Conference of the International Woman Suffrage Alliance was held from 15 - 21 June 1908, at the Concertgebouw, Amsterdam, Netherlands.

The Fourth Congress numbered thirteen countries at its opening, including delegates from the recently formed women's groups in Bulgaria, the Czech lands and Hungary. Three new applications for membership were heard and the organizations accepted, namely, those of the Bulgarian Women's Union, which was presented by Zheni Pateva; the Swiss Verband fur Frauenstimmrecht; the two associations of Cape Town and Natal, which had united for the purpose of affiliation, and thus represented South Africa. Fraternal delegates represented five additional countries, and as all the auxiliary associations had sent delegates to the meeting, twenty-one countries in all were represented in the Amsterdam Congress.

"England is the storm center of our movement," declared the President of the International Woman's Suffrage Alliance in the Amsterdam Congress, after hearing Amy Sanderson, one of the 3 national executive delegates describe the attitude of the British government and of middle class women. This was the conviction of the Congress, which therefore resolved to hold the next International Woman's Suffrage Congress in London (in April, 1909).

== See also ==
- International Alliance of Women

== Bibliography ==
- International Alliance of Women for Suffrage and Equal Citizenship (1908). Report of Congress (Public domain ed.). Amsterdam, Holland.
- Schirmacher, Käthe (1912). The Modern Woman's Rights Movement: A Historical Survey (Public domain ed.). Kraus Reprint.
