= Varvara Brilliant-Lerman =

Russian plant physiologist (1888–1954)

- Born: Varvara Alexandrovna Brilliant-Lerman; 5 April 1888; Saint Petersburg, Russian Empire
- Died: 17 May 1954 (aged 66); Leningrad, Soviet Union
- Education: St. Petersburg Bestuzhev Advanced Courses for Women
- Known for: Brilliant phenomenon

Varvara Alexandrovna Brilliant-Lerman (Russian: Варвара Александровна Бриллиант-Лерман; 5 April 1888 – 17 May 1954) was a Russian plant physiologist who discovered the "Brilliant phenomenon".

== Early life and education ==
Varvara Alexandrovna Brilliant-Lerman was born on 5 April 1888 in Saint Petersburg into a Jewish family. As a child she learned to speak German, French and English. She attended the St. Petersburg Bestuzhev Advanced Courses for Women, upon her graduation in 1912, she and other high-performing students stayed at the Courses to further their knowledge on plant physiology. In 1915, she passed state examinations that licensed her to teach at the St. Petersburg Bestuzhev Advanced Courses and other private institutions.

== Career ==
From 1913 to 1926, she worked in several universities in Petrograd, including the laboratory of S. P. Kostychev head of the Department of Plant Physiology at Petrograd University and professor of plant physiology at the Bestuzhev Courses from 1913 to 1920.

The Russian Revolution of 1917 opened up more opportunities for professional careers for women in science. From 1920, Brilliant-Lerman worked in the Botanical Institute of the Academy of Sciences. At the same time, she was employed as a lecturer at the Polytechnic Institute, State Institute of Medical Knowledge, P. F. Lesgaft Institute of Physical Training and the Geographical Institute.

Brilliant-Lerman's research concentrated on the physiological mechanism of photosynthesis. In 1925, she discovered that photosynthesis could be stimulated by the slight dehydration of plants, this discovery was named the "Brilliant phenomenon" after her. As well as that, she also noted the emission of oxygen by plants in the dark.

Brilliant-Lerman received "candidate of sciences" degree (equivalent to a Ph.D.) in 1935 for her work in plant physiology. With her study "Photosynthesis as a vital function of plants" in 1941, she became a Doctor of Sciences. By this time, she was recognised as a specialist in photosynthesis in Soviet Russia and she became one of the leading scientists at the Botanical Institute and she headed the Department of Ecology and Physiology of Plants as well as teaching there from 1945 until her death in 1954.

== Death and legacy ==
Brilliant-Lerman died on 17 May 1954 in Leningrad, at the age of 66.

With her research, Brilliant-Lerman demonstrated that photosynthesis is a function of a living plant rather than a conventional physico-chemical process. She also researched the effect of acidity of the medium, oxygen in the air and other ecological factors on the intensity of photosynthesis. Her work had a single-minded focus on the examination of the nature and characteristics of the photosynthesis process in plants and what she called "the physiology of photosynthesis" or "the ecology of photosynthesis". Brilliant-Lerman's work also contributed to the establishment of a new field of experimental botany in Russia.

She has an entry in the Great Soviet Encyclopedia.
