= Stella Blagoeva =

1987 stamp depicting Stella Blagoeva

Stella Dimitrova Blagoeva (Bulgarian: Стела Димитрова Благоева; 1887–1954) was a Bulgarian Communist revolutionary and diplomat, the most prominent woman politician in the early People's Republic of Bulgaria.

== Life ==
Stella Blagoeva was the daughter of revolutionary Dimitur Blagoev and novelist Vela Blagoeva. She studied music in Prague and then philology and history at the University of Sofia. She then began teaching in a high school. She joined the Tesniak (Socialist) Party, led by her father. After 1919, she joined the Communist Party of Bulgaria.

After the failed 1923 insurrection, her parents died and she lost her teaching job. Released from jail in 1926, she travelled to the Soviet Union, rising in the Comintern to become director of the cadre section of the Latin-language countries. On the Comintern's 1943 dissolution, she was appointed to the foreign bureau of the Bulgarian Communist Party, and the presidium of the Slavic anti-fascist Committee. By the end of World War II she was President of the Pan-Slav Committee.

After World War II she returned to Bulgaria, where she became prominent in the Bulgarian Communist Party. From 1946 to 1949 she was vice-president of the Bulgarian Slavic Committee. In 1949 she was appointed Bulgaria's ambassador to the Soviet Union. In 1950 she became a full member of the party's central committee.

Blagoeva died in Moscow on February 16, 1954.

The centenary of Blagoeva's birth was celebrated in a 1987 Bulgarian postage stamp.

== Works ==
- Dimitrov: a biography. London: Martin Lawrence, 1934.
- Georgi Dimitrov : a biographical sketch. Translated by Marjorie Pojarlieva; edited by Vessa Zheliazkova. Sofia: Foreign Languages Press, 1961.
