= Sofia Romanskaya =

Soviet astronomer (1886–1969)

Sofia Vasilievna Voroshilova-Romanskaya
- Born: 1886; St. Petersburg, Russia
- Died: 1969 (aged 82–83)
- Other name: Sofia Romanskaya
- Education: Bestuzhev Courses
- Occupation: Astronomer

Sofia Romanskaya (1886–1969) was a Soviet astronomer known as one of the first Russian women to have a significant role in the field.

== Biography ==
Sofia (also spelled Sofya) Vasilievna Voroshilova-Romanskaya was born in St. Petersburg. She graduated from the Bestuzhev Courses, a prominent women's educational institution in the Russian Empire.

Romanskaya worked at the Pulkovo Observatory from 1908 to 1959. There, she carried out over 20,000 latitude observations in her studies of polar motion. She was a member of the International Astronomical Union and attended the organization's 1958 General Assembly in Moscow.

The asteroid (3761) Romanskaya, discovered by Grigory Neujmin in 1936, was named after her. A crater on planet Venus also bears her name.
