= Tatyana Krasnoselskaya =

Russian botanist (1884–1950)

Tatiana Abramovna Krasnoselskaia
- Born: 1 January 1884; St Petersburg, Russian Empire
- Died: 17 February 1950 (aged 66); Moscow, Soviet Union
- Resting place: Novodevichy Cemetery
- Education: Bestuzhev Courses; Saint Petersburg Imperial University (M.A.)
- Scientific career
- Fields: Botany
- Workplaces: Bestuzhev Courses; Saint Petersburg Imperial University; Moscow State V. I. Lenin Pedagogical Institute

Tatiana Krasnoselskaia (1 January 1884 – 17 February 1950) was a Russian botanist specializing in plant physiology.

== Life ==
Tatiana Abramovna Krasnoselskaia was born on 1 January 1884 in St Petersburg, capital of the Russian Empire. She studied physics and mathematics in the Bestuzhev Courses, graduating in 1904. She was an assistant professor at the St Petersburg Agricultural Courses (1907–09) and then became an assistant professor at the Bestuzhev Courses from 1909 to 1914. While teaching Krasnoselskaia earned her M.A. at Saint Petersburg Imperial University in 1912. Two years later she moved to Tiflis, Georgia, lecturing at the Tiflis Higher Women's Courses, Transcaucasian University and the Krasnodar Agricultural Institute and became an associate of the Tiflis Botanical Garden, remaining there until 1921. That year Krasnoselskaia returned to Leningrad, as St Petersburg had been renamed by the Bolsheviks, and lectured at the Leningrad Institute of Textile Crops and the Leningrad Timber Institute until 1925. She was a researcher at the Laboratory of Plant Physiology of the All-Union Phytological Research Institute from 1925 to 1935. For the next two years, she was a professor and chair of the Department of Plant Physiology and Microbiology at the Saratov Agricultural Institute. In 1938 she became chair of the Department of Botany at the Moscow State V. I. Lenin Pedagogical Institute, remaining there until her death on 17 February 1950 in Moscow.

== Activities ==
Krasnoselskaia's research concentrated on the growth and development of plants. She also wrote on the history of plant physiology and edited several agricultural and biological dictionaries. She also translated scientific books articles into Russian, including some by the botanist, Hans Molisch.
