= Bulgarian Women's Union =

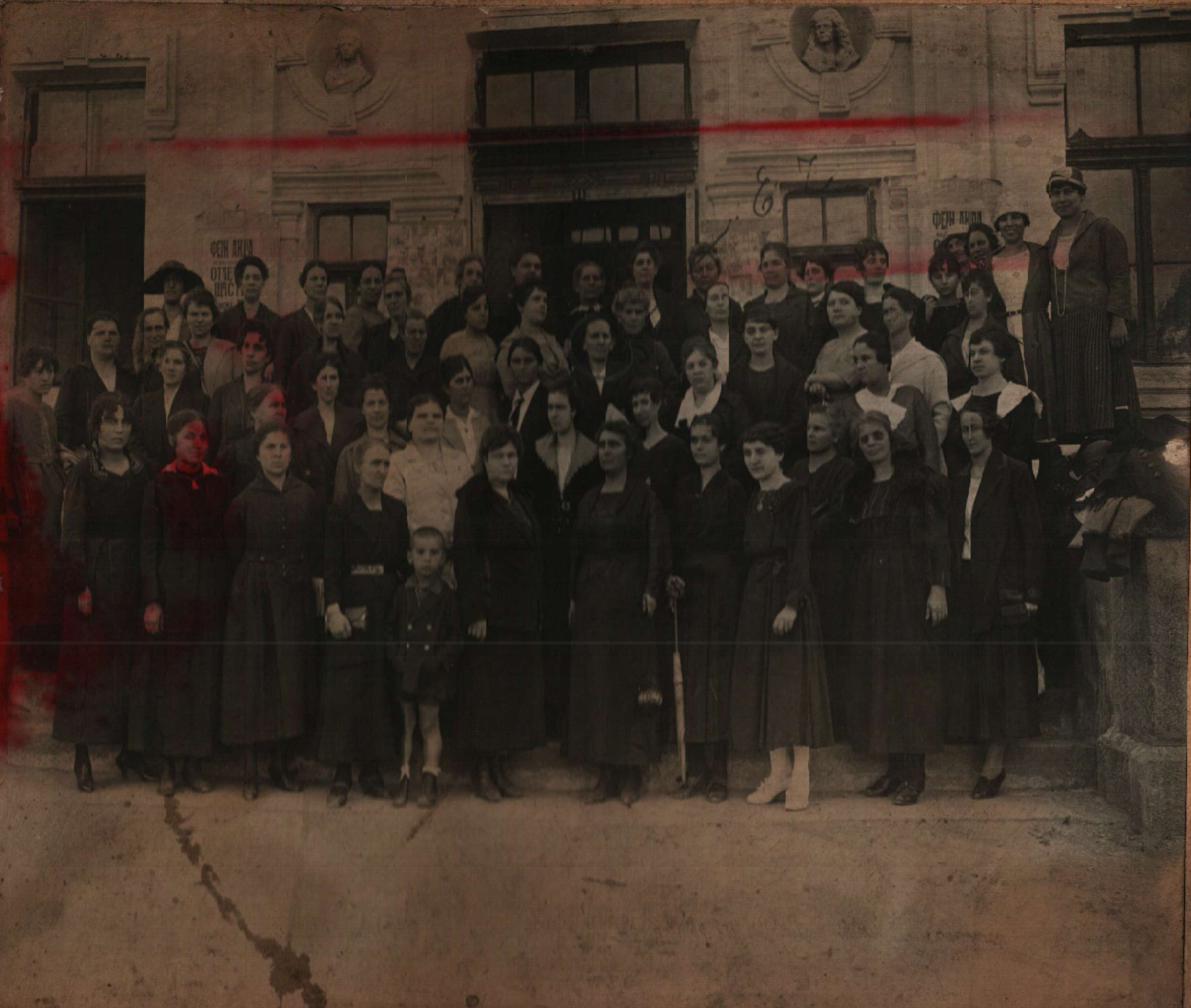
Bulgarian Women's Union

The Bulgarian Women's Union (Bulgarian: Български женски съюз, 'Balgarski Zhenski Sayuz' \'b&l-gar-ski 'zhen-ski s&-'yuz\), was a women's rights organisation active in Bulgaria from 1901 to 1944.

In 1901, the organisation was founded by Vela Blagoeva, Ekaterina Karavelova, Anna Karima, Kina Konova, Julia Malinova, and Zheni Pateva. The organization was an umbrella organization of the 27 local women's organisations that had been established in Bulgaria since 1878. It was founded as a reply to the limitations of women's education and access to university studies in the 1890s, with the goal to further women's intellectual development and participation, arranged national congresses and used Zhenski glas as its organ. It was dissolved following the communist take over in Bulgaria in 1944 and replaced by the Bulgarian National Women's Union.

Chairpersons

1. 1901-1906: Anna Karima
2. 1908-1910: Julia Malinova
3. 1912-1926: Julia Malinova
4. 1926-1944: Dimitrana Ivanova

== See also ==
- Bulgarian Union of Progressive Women
- First wave feminism
