= Petar Malinov =

Bulgarian footballer and manager

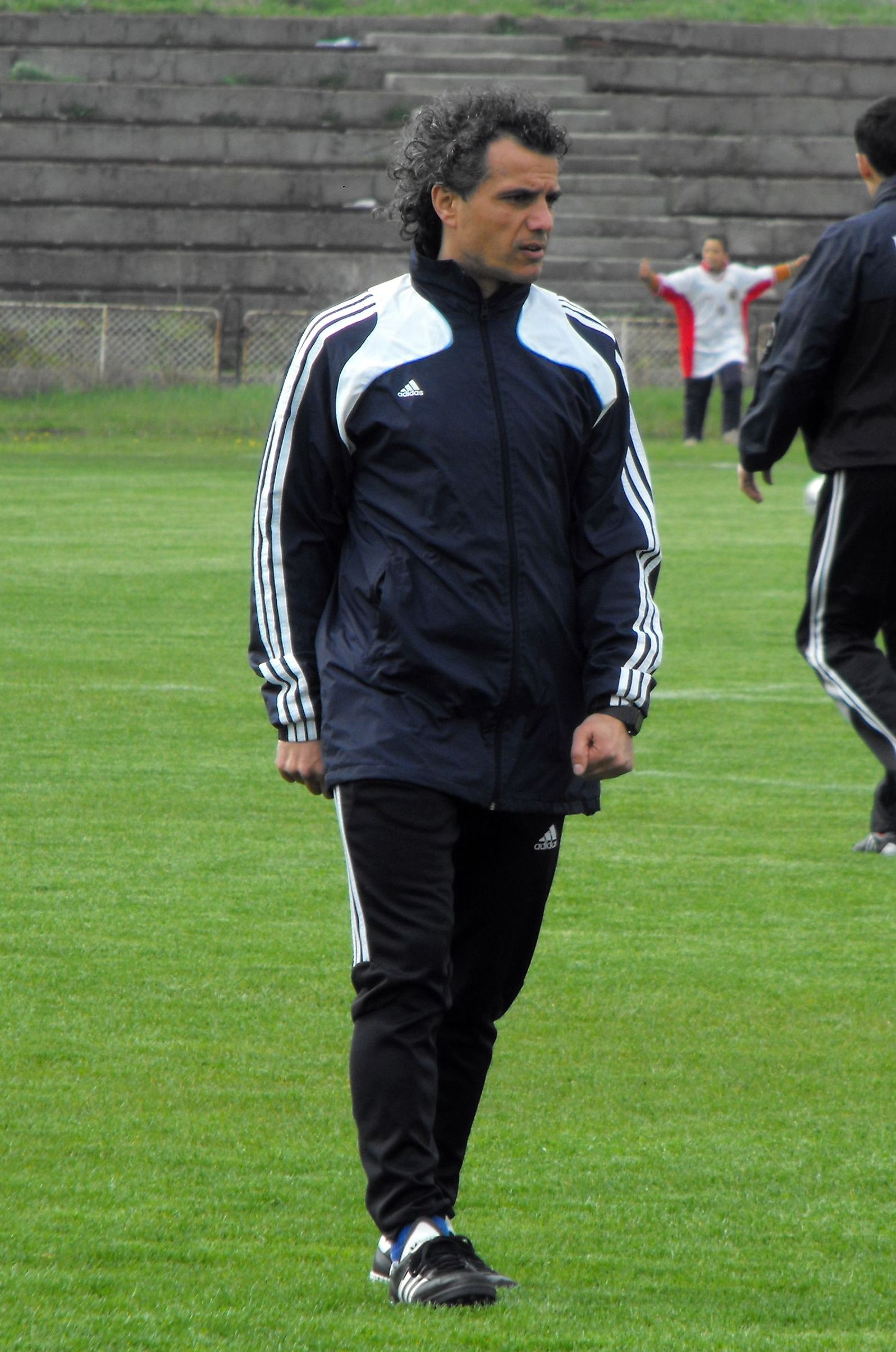

Personal information
- Full name: Petar Lyubenov Malinov
- Date of birth: 29 January 1970 (age 56)
- Place of birth: Sofia, Bulgaria
- Position: Forward

Team information
- Current team: F.C. Slivnishki geroi (manager)

Youth career
- 1980–1990: CSKA Sofia

Senior career*
Years	Team	Apps	(Gls)
1990–1992	Septemvri Sofia	31	(7)
1992–1993	Spartak Pleven	21	(4)
1993–1995	Storgozia Pleven	50	(14)
1995–1998	Septemvri Sofia	77	(20)
1998	SR Delémont	14	(3)
1999	Septemvri Sofia	9	(1)
1999–2000	Belasitsa Petrich	29	(3)
2001	Rilski Sportist	17	(4)
2001–2004	Makedonska slava	74	(23)
2004	Minyor Bobov Dol	11	(1)
2005	Balkan Botevgrad	1	(0)
2006–2009	Slivnishki geroi	65	(18)
Total		399	(98)

Managerial career
- 2009–: Slivnishki geroi (Assistant)
- * Club domestic league appearances and goals

Petar Malinov (Bulgarian: Петър Малинов; born 29 January 1970) is a retired Bulgarian footballer and current assistant manager of Slivnishki geroi, having started the role in May 2010.

Born in Sofia, Malinov played club football in Bulgaria. He ended his career as a player-manager with FC Slivnishki Geroy (Slivnitsa).
