= Ekaterina Zlatoustova =

Bulgarian feminist, civil servant and teacher (1881–1952)

Ekaterina Hristova Zlatoustova
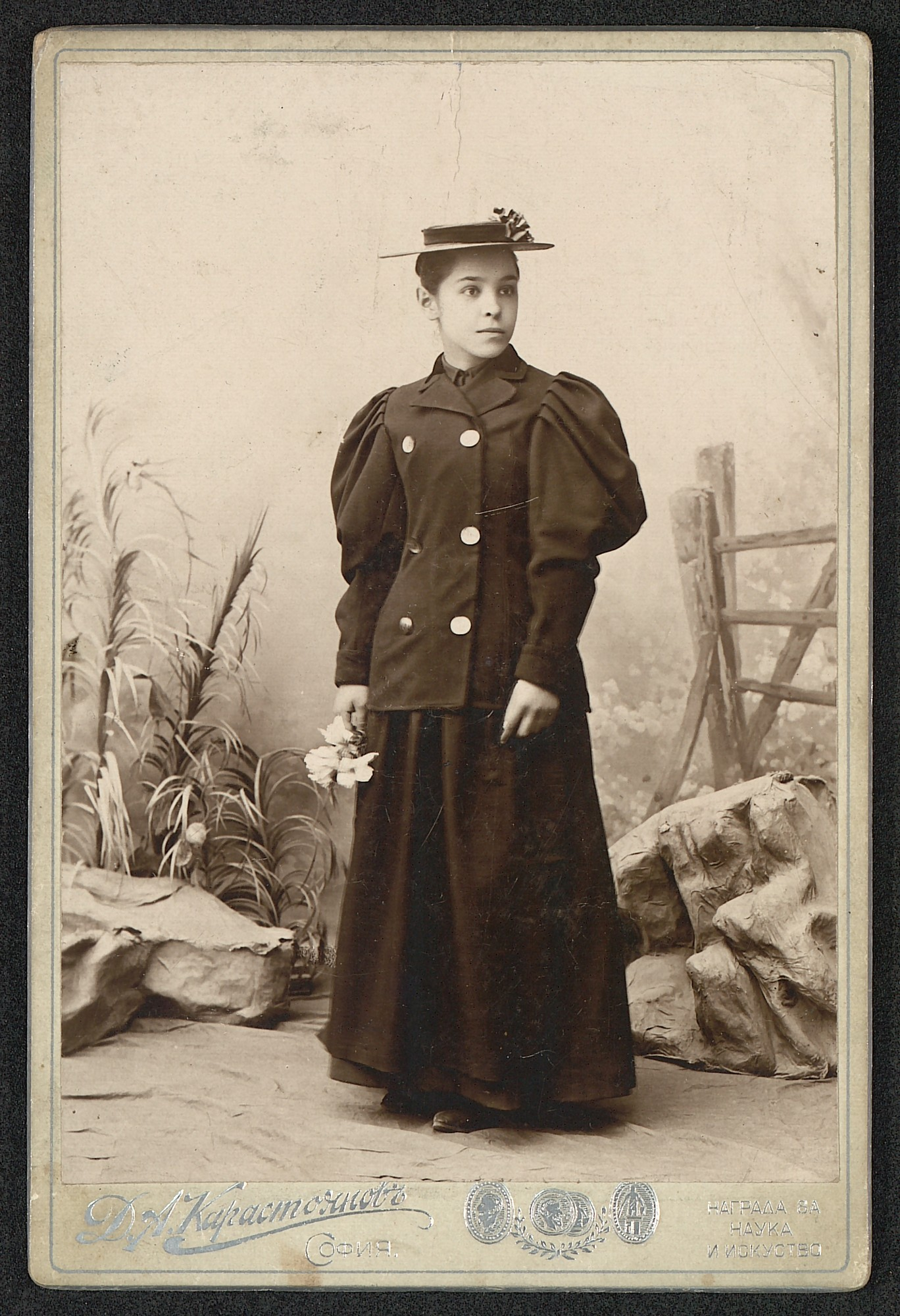
- Born: 22 September 1881; Varna, Bulgaria
- Died: 1952 (aged 70–71); Sofia, Bulgaria
- Education: Bestuzhev Courses
- Occupations: Feminist, teacher and civil servant

Ekaterina Hristova Zlatoustova (22 September 1881 – 1952) was a Bulgarian feminist, civil servant and teacher.

== Life ==
Ekaterina Zlatoustova was born on 22 September 1881 in Varna, Bulgaria and graduated from an elite girl's secondary school in Sofia, the capital of Bulgaria, in 1898. She attended the Bestuzhev Courses, in St Petersburg, the capital of the Russian Empire, 1902–05. Upon her return to Bulgaria, she taught history, geography, Bulgarian and Russian in Shumen 1905–07 and then at her old school in Sofia from 1908 to 1918. After the war, Zlatoustova became one of the few women to work for the government, initially in the Ministry of Education and Science and then as the head of department for cultural institutions and funds from 1918 to 1931. She died in Sofia in 1952.

== Activities ==
Zlatoustova founded the Bulgarian branch of the International Federation of University Women (IFUW)(the Association of Bulgarian Women with Higher Education (Druzhestvo na Bulgarkite s Visshe Obrazovanie) (DBVO)) in 1924. She served as vice-president and president from 1926 to 1937. While in Paris, France, for a term with the French Ministry of Education in 1925, she met Professor Ellen Gleditsch, the president of the IFUW and they corresponded almost until Zlatoustova's death.
