= Tsola Dragoycheva =

Bulgarian politician

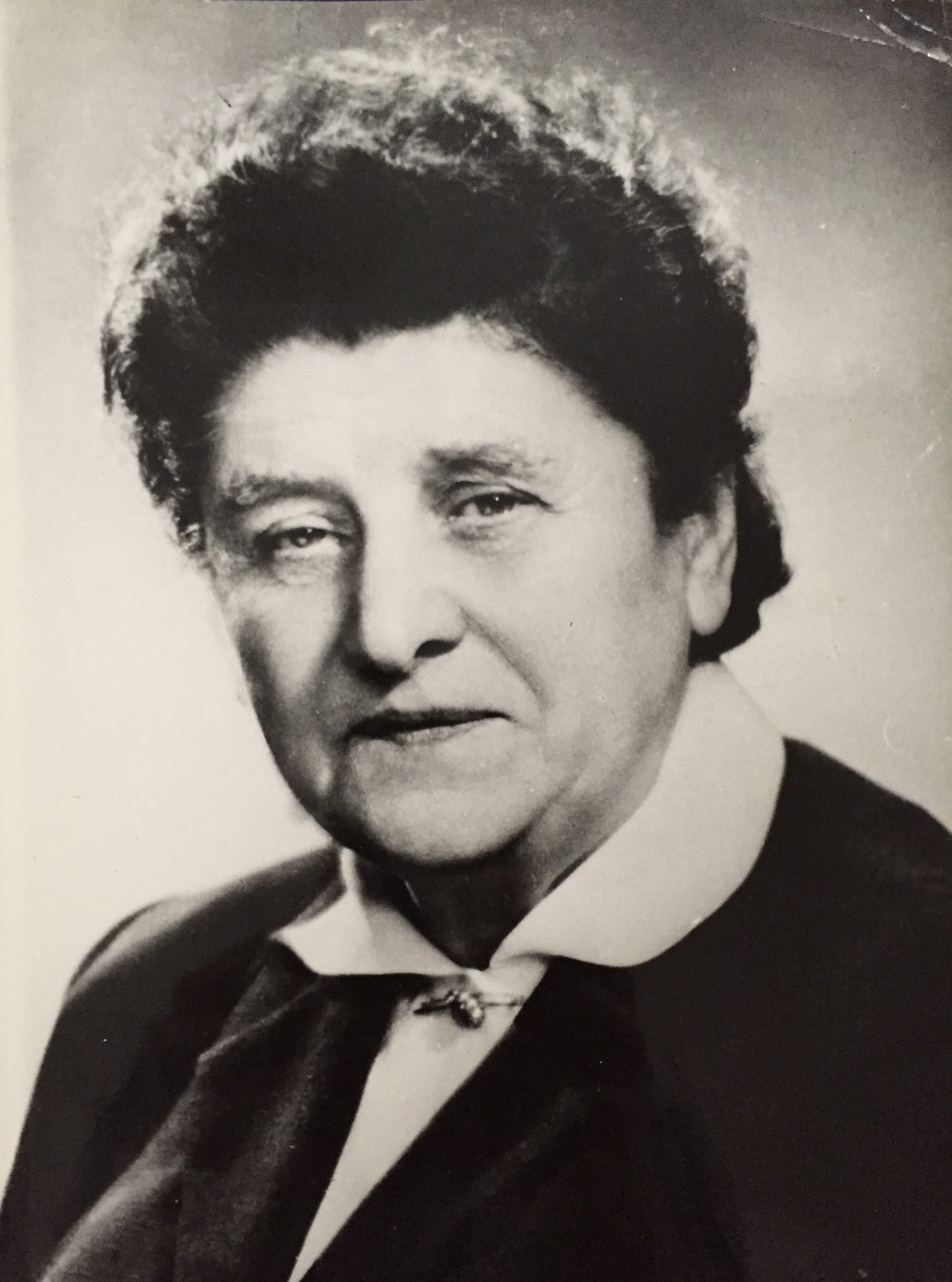

Tsola Nincheva Dragoycheva (Bulgarian: Цола Нинчева Драгойчева; 18 August 1898 – 26 May 1993), also known under the pseudonym Sonya, was a Bulgarian politician of the Bulgarian Communist Party (BCP). A member of the illegal armed wing of the party in the 1920s, she spent years in prison and as an émigré in the Soviet Union. After World War II, she held a number of high posts and was part of the nomenklatura. From 1946 until 1990, she was continuously a member of the National Assembly of Bulgaria. On 11 December 1947 she became the first female member of a cabinet in the history of the country.

== Life and career ==
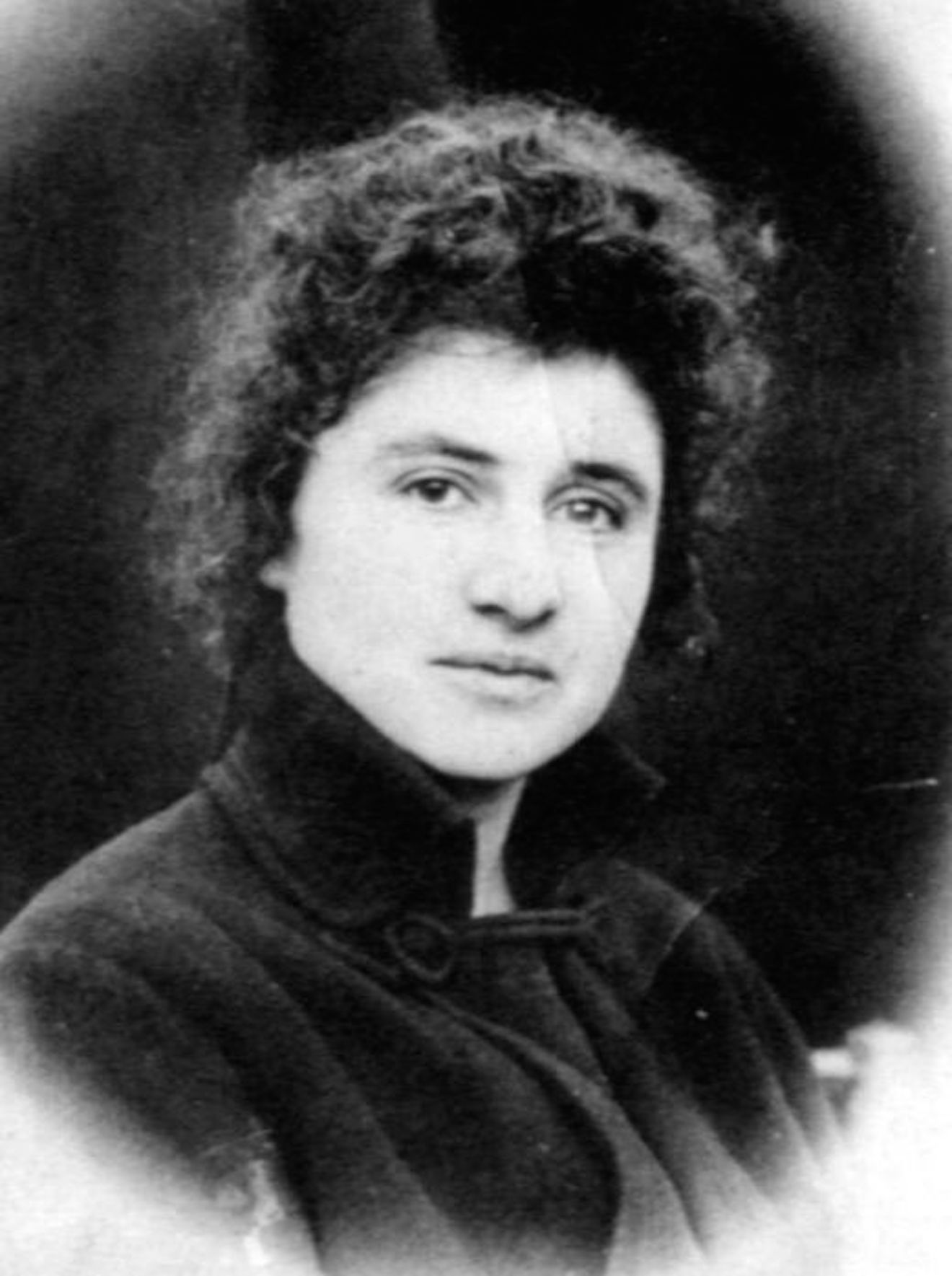
Tsola Dragoycheva as a young woman

Dragoycheva was born on 30 August [O.S. 18 August] 1898 in the town of Byala Slatina in Vratsa Province, northwestern Bulgaria. In 1919, she joined the Communist Party. She graduated from the high pedagogical school in Sofia and became a teacher. She took part in the communist September Uprising of 1923 and was sentenced to 15 years in prison and was deprived of her teaching rights. She was amnestied in 1924 and quickly became a member of the regional directorates of her party's armed wing in Rousse, Varna and Plovdiv. In the wake of the St Nedelya Church assault in 1925, Dragoycheva was again imprisoned and sentenced to death; the execution was postponed due to her pregnancy and her capital punishment was replaced with a life sentence in 1926. In 1932, she was again granted amnesty; her son, surgeon Chavdar Dragoychev, was born in prison.

In 1932, she emigrated to Moscow; there she graduated from the International Lenin School and worked at the Comintern's International Communist Women's Secretariat for a year. Dragoycheva returned to Bulgaria in 1936 and was elected a member of the Bulgarian Communist Party's Central Committee, which she remained until 2 February 1990. From 1941 on, she was a member of the BCP's Politburo.

Dragoycheva took an active part in the BCP and the Fatherland Front's armed resistance to Bulgaria's alignment with the Axis powers of World War II. She was arrested in August 1941 and interned at the Sveti Nikola women's wing of the Gonda Voda concentration camp near Asenovgrad; she remained there until December.

After the coup d'état of 1944 and her party's rise to power, Dragoycheva took a number of posts, including General Secretary of the Fatherland Front (1944–1948), chairwoman of the Bulgarian People's Women's Union (1945–1950), Minister of Posts, Telegraphs and Telephones (1947–1957), chairwoman of the National Committee for the Protection of Peace (1949–1952), chairwoman of the All-People's Committee for Bulgarian-Soviet Friendship (1957–1977) and its honorary chairwoman from 1977 onwards. When appointed as Minister of Posts, Telegraphs and Telephones, Dragoycheva became the first woman in Bulgaria appointed to the cabinet. In 1945, she attended the founding meeting of the Women's International Democratic Federation in Paris.

Dragoycheva was a supporter of the killing of Nikola Petkov, Traycho Kostov and other "enemies of the people". She advocated Bulgaria's admission to the Soviet Union as its 16th republic and acted as a censor of culture and arts. A close friend of Joseph Kobzon and Andrei Tupolev, she was awarded the Lenin Peace Prize in 1971.

Her memoirs give a detailed overview of the so called "Bulgarians in Vardar Macedonia'"s state in and after World War II and express the BCP's views on the Macedonian Question. However, they were heavily criticized by Internal Macedonian Revolutionary Organization (IMRO) leader Ivan Mihaylov.

Dragoycheva died in Sofia on 26 May 1993, living to the age of 94.

== Honours and awards ==
- Hero of the People's Republic of Bulgaria (1968)
- Hero of Socialist Labour (1963)
- Order of Georgi Dimitrov, twice (1963, 1968)
- Order of Lenin
- International Lenin Prize "for peace between peoples" (1972)
