= Bestuzhev Courses =

Imperial Russian women's education institution

Coordinates: 59°56′34″N 30°16′22″E

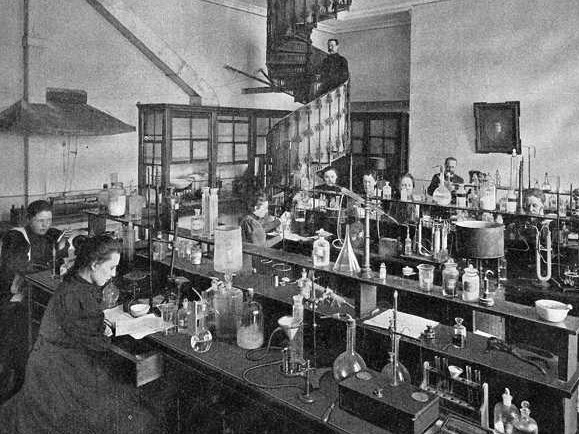
Students at the chemistry laboratory

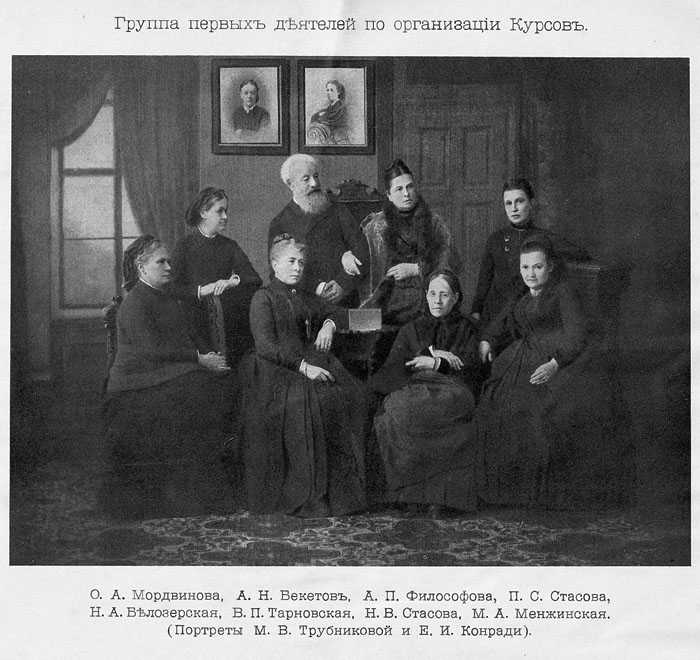
The organizers and initiators of the program

The Bestuzhev Courses (Russian: Бестужевские курсы) in Saint Petersburg were the largest and most prominent women's higher education institution in Imperial Russia.

The institute opened its doors in 1878. It was named after Konstantin Bestuzhev-Ryumin, the first director. However, the actual lead organizing force was provided by women: Nadezhda Stasova, Anna Filosofova, and several others.

Other professors included Baudouin de Courtenay, Alexander Borodin, Faddei Zielinski, Dmitry Mendeleyev, Ivan Sechenov, and Sergey Platonov. An assistant professor there was Vera Bogdanovskaya, the first female chemist to die as a result of her own research. Nadezhda Krupskaya and Maria Piłsudska were among the graduates. The courses occupied a purpose-built edifice on Vasilievsky Island.

After the Russian Revolution, they were reorganized as the Third University of Petrograd, which was merged into the Petrograd University in September 1919.

== Notable alumnae ==
- Varvara Brilliant-Lerman (1888–1954), plant physiologist
- Anna Chertkova (1859–1927), children's writer, social activist and Peredvizhniki's model
- Élisabeth Tchernayev, later known as Élisabeth Jérémine, (1879 -1964) Russian French geologist and petrographer
- Tatyana Krasnoselskaya (1884–1950), Russian botanist
- Nadezhda Krupskaya (1869–1939), Bolshevik revolutionary, wife of Vladimir Lenin
- Praskovya Frantsevna Kudelli (1859 – 1944), Bolshevik revolutionary, educator, and publicist
- Zinaida Nevzorova (1869–1948), socialist revolutionary
- Maria Piłsudska (1865–1921), First Lady of Poland
- Vera Yevstafievna Popova (1867–1896), chemist
- Anna Radlova (1891–1949), Russian and Soviet writer
- Sofia Romanskaya (1886–1969), Soviet astronomer
- Kateryna Skarzhynska (1852 –1932), Ukrainian folklorist
- Olga Ilyinichna Ulyanova (1871–1891), sister of Vladimir Lenin
- Mariia Vetrova (1870-1897), Ukrainian revolutionary
- Lyubov Zapolskaya (1871–1943), Russian mathematician
- Ekaterina Zlatoustova (1881–1952), Bulgarian feminist, civil servant, and teacher

== See also ==
- Guerrier Courses
- Women's Higher Courses (Kyiv)
