= Malinová (Rakovník District) =

- Municipality
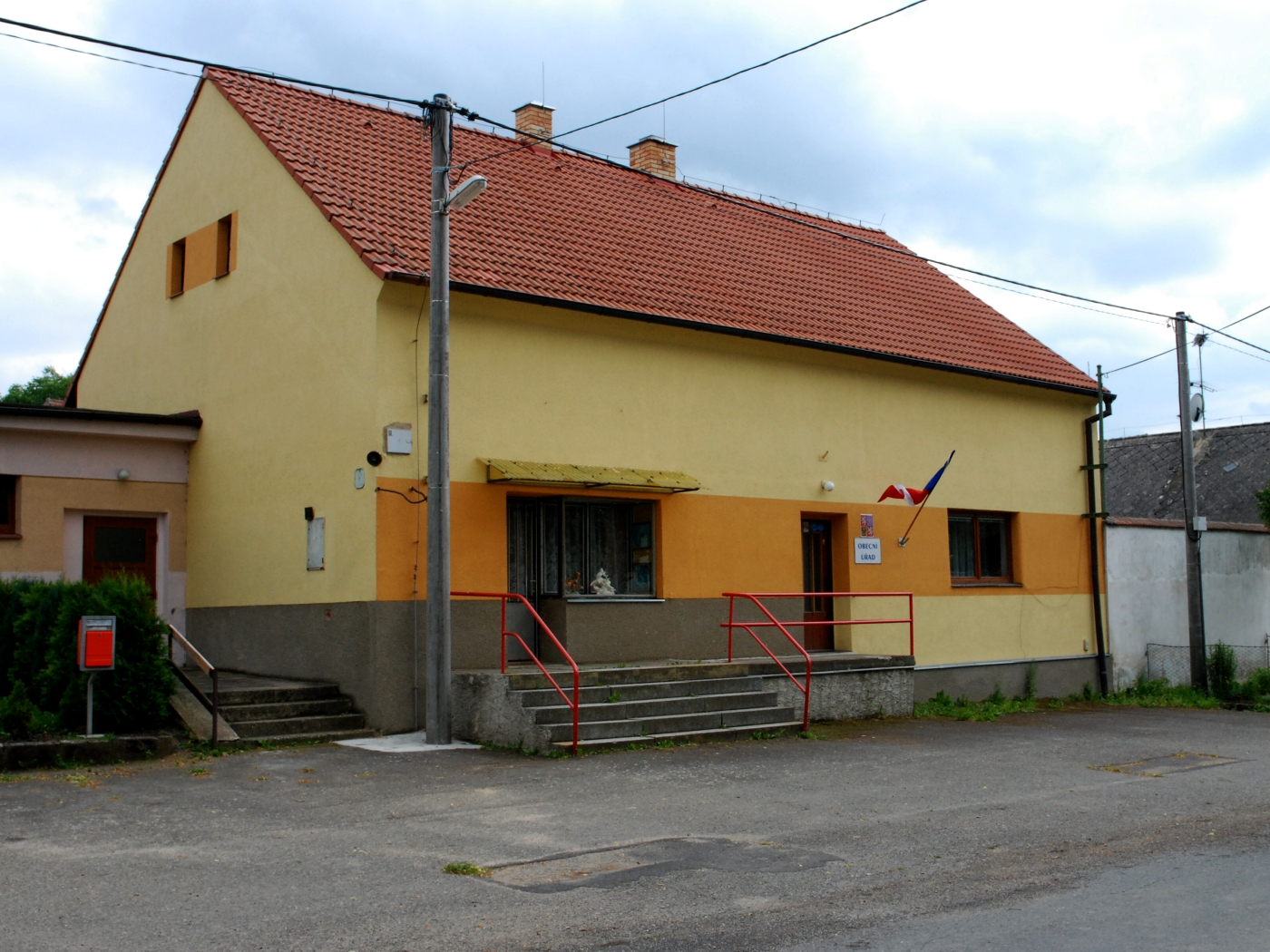
- Municipal office

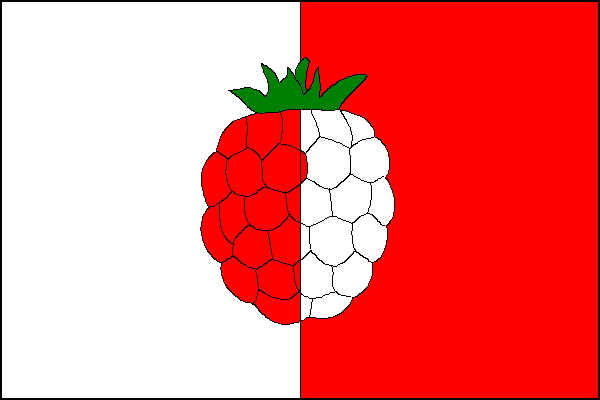
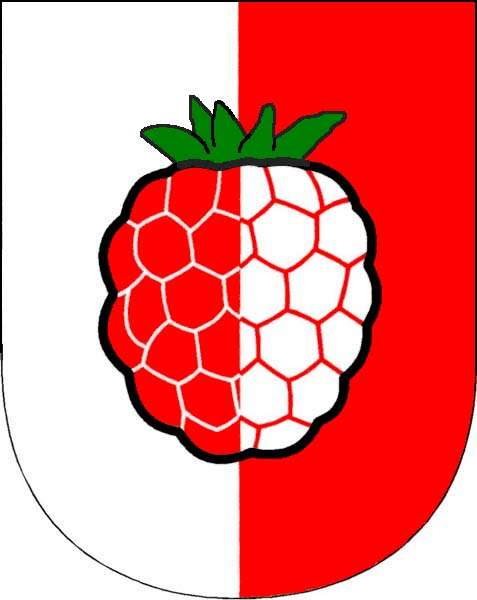
- Flag Coat of arms

- Location in the Czech Republic
- Coordinates: 50°2′52″N 13°40′1″E
- Country: Czech Republic
- Region: Central Bohemian
- District: Rakovník
- First mentioned: 1585

Area
  - Total: 3.28 km^{2} (1.27 sq mi)
- Elevation: 480 m (1,570 ft)

Population (2026-01-01)
  - Total: 105
  - Density: 32.0/km^{2} (82.9/sq mi)
- Time zone: UTC+1 (CET)
  - Summer (DST): UTC+2 (CEST)
- Postal code: 270 35
- Website: www.obec-malinova.cz

Malinová is a municipality and village in Rakovník District in the Central Bohemian Region of the Czech Republic. It has about 100 inhabitants.

== Demographics ==
Historical population
Year	Pop.	±%
1869	231	—
1880	215	−6.9%
1890	206	−4.2%
1900	171	−17.0%
1910	173	+1.2%
1921	167	−3.5%
1930	182	+9.0%
1950	131	−28.0%
1961	126	−3.8%
1970	98	−22.2%
1980	83	−15.3%
1991	75	−9.6%
2001	73	−2.7%
2011	79	+8.2%
2021	90	+13.9%
Source: Censuses
