= Mariia Vetrova =

Ukrainian teacher and revolutionary (1870–1897)

- Марія Вєтрова
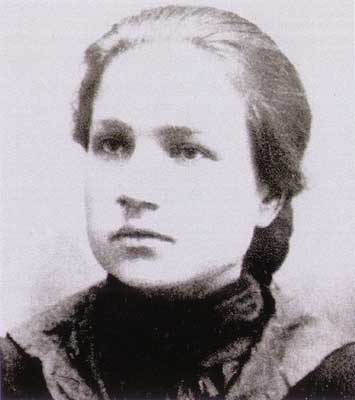
- Vetrova in the 1890s
- Born: 3 January 1870; Solonivka, Chernihiv Governorate, Russian Empire (now Ukraine)
- Died: 24 February 1897 (aged 27); Peter and Paul Fortress, Saint Petersburg, Russian Empire
- Cause of death: Self-immolation
- Resting place: Transfiguration Cemetery
- Occupations: Teacher; actor
- Years active: 1888–1897
- Movement: Narodniks

Mariia Fedosiivna Vetrova (Ukrainian: Марія Федосіївна Вєтрова; 3 January 1870 – 24 February 1897) was a Ukrainian teacher and revolutionary. After working as a teacher in different parts of Ukraine and briefly joining a theatre troupe, she joined a socialist circle in Azov and became a devotee of the works of Leo Tolstoy. She continued her studies in Saint Petersburg, but was encouraged to become a revolutionary after meeting Tolstoy himself. She was arrested for anti-Tsarist publishing activities and died by self-immolation in the Peter and Paul Fortress. Her death became a rallying cry for the rise of an anti-Tsarist student movement, inspiring dedications by Tolstoy and Maxim Gorky, the latter of whom wrote "The Song of the Stormy Petrel" as a result.

== Biography ==
Mariia Fedosiivna Vetrova was born on 3 January 1870, in Solonivka, in the Chernihiv Governorate of the Russian Empire (modern-day Chernihiv Oblast, Ukraine). The illegitimate child of a Cossack woman, Oleksandra Vetrova, and a local notary, she was raised as an orphan by a peasant woman who she called her "grandmother". In 1888, she graduated from college as a teacher, going on to teach at a rural school in Liubech.

Her meagre teacher's salary was insufficient to support her, and she became lonely in the small rural village. In April 1889, she joined the Ukrainian acting troupe of Mykola Sadovskyy. They travelled throughout Ukraine, playing to small theatres with basic costumes and sets. But when she went to give her first performance, she got stage fright and left the theatre troupe.

She moved to Azov to resume work as a teacher. There she joined the local socialist circle and became close friends with Antip Kulakov, a Narodnik from Taganrog. She became an eager reader and was particularly inspired by Leo Tolstoy's article "What is Happiness?" As the years passed, she became increasingly driven to continue her studies. In 1894, she left Azov and enrolled in the Bestuzhev Courses at Saint Petersburg Imperial University. But she was quickly disappointed by her professors, whose lectures she found intellectually unstimulating. The following year she met Tolstoy himself, who inspired her to become a revolutionary. She then began teaching the Russian language and arithmetic at a workers' Sunday school, at the Obukhov State Plant.

On 24 June 1897, the Tsarist authorities carried out mass arrests of people in Saint Petersburg suspected of involvement in a Narodnik printing operation. Vetrova knew a number of the people who were arrested. On 2 January 1897 [O.S. 22 December 1896], she was arrested for possessing anti-government propaganda and also suspected of involvement in the revolutionary printing operation. She was imprisoned in Peter and Paul Fortress, where she self-immolated on 20 February [O.S. 8 February] 1897 and died from her burns on 24 February [O.S. 12 February] 1897. The prison authorities attempted to cover up her suicide, and she was secretly buried in the Transfiguration Cemetery.

== Legacy ==
News of her death leaked the following month, provoking student protests in Saint Petersburg, Moscow and Kyiv. On 4 March 1897, five thousand people gathered at Saint Petersburg's Kazan Cathedral to pay their respects to Vetrova, but the memorial service was banned, and 850 demonstrators were arrested. Among those in attendance were Nikolay Beketov, Nikolai Kareev, Vladimir Lamansky, Sergey Platonov and Nestor Kotlyarevsky. Stanislav Strumilin recalled the day as his "baptism of fire" and the start of a period of sustained public activism against the Tsarist autocracy. Kazan Cathedral became a focal point for further student demonstrations, with Maxim Gorky's reflections on one demonstration in 1901 becoming the revolutionary anthem "The Song of the Stormy Petrel".

Vetrova was declared a revolutionary martyr by Mykola Voronyi and Borys Hrinchenko, while clandestine revolutionary organisations issued proclamations in her name. Leo Tolstoy himself also paid tribute to her memory.

== See also ==
- List of political self-immolations

== Bibliography ==
- Evans Clements, Barbara (1997). Bolshevik Women. University of Cambridge. p. 25. ISBN 0521599202.
- Shulyatikov, Vladimir (16 March 2010). "Мария Ветрова в памяти поколений" [Mariia Vetrova in the memory of generations]. Gorodnya (in Russian). Archived from the original on 8 January 2021.
- Usenko, Pavlo Heorhiyovych (2003). "ВІТРОВА Марія Федосіївна" [VITROVA Mariia Fedosiivna]. In Smoliy, V. A. (ed.). Encyclopedia of History of Ukraine (in Ukrainian). Vol. 1. Kyiv: Institute of History of Ukraine.
