= Dimitrana Ivanova =

Bulgarian educational reformer, suffragist and women's rights activist

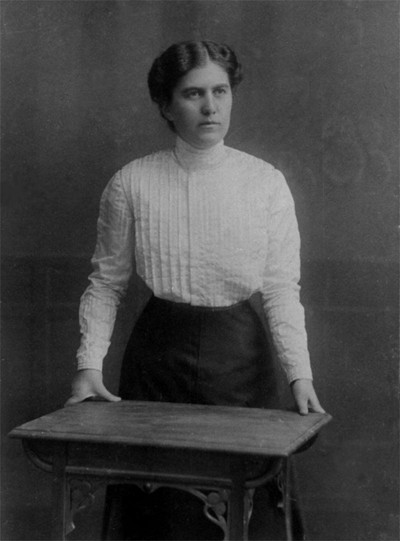
- Born: Dimitrana Petrova; 2 January 1881
- Died: 1960 (aged 78–79)
- Education: University of Zürich, University of Sofia
- Occupations: Educator, Activist, Suffragist
- Spouse: Doncho Ivanov (m. 1914)
- Children: 3

Dimitrana Ivanova, née Petrova (Bulgarian: Димитрана Иванова, 1881–1960), was a Bulgarian educational reformer, suffragist and women's rights activist. She chaired the Bulgarian Women's Union from 1926 to 1944.

She was a prominent figure in the early 20th-century movement for women's rights in Bulgaria. She campaigned for women's civil and political rights and was instrumental in advancing girls' education and women's involvement in public and professional spheres. As a journalist, she contributed to publications that advocated for women's rights and their empowerment in Bulgaria.

== Biography ==
Dimitrana Ivanova née Petrova was born on 1 February 1881 in Ruse, Bulgaria. The daughter of a trader, she was educated in the local girls' school and high school for girls.

During her time in Bulgaria, women were only allowed to listen into lectures at the University of Sofia from 1896, but could not be regular students there until 1901, and even then it remained difficult, as high schools for girls offered only six of the seven secondary grades required for university admission. Therefore, Dimitrana Ivanova was denied a place to study law in Sofia on these grounds. However, she moved to Switzerland to study education and philosophy at the University of Zürich and became the first female to study there.

When she returned to Bulgaria in 1900, she was employed as a teacher, which was at this time practically the only profession open to women (although until 1904, banned for married women). She taught girls in Popovo, Shumen, Pleven, Veliko Tarnovo and Ruse.

In parallel to her teaching career, Dimitrana Ivanova wrote articles on educational topics for professional journals such as Uchitel (Teacher) and Uchilischen Pregled (School Review).

Starting in 1905, she contributed to the newspapers Uchitelska Probuda (Teacher's Awakening) and Zhenski Glas (Women's Voice) and became the editor-in-chief of the latter from September 1920 to September 1944.

In 1908, she became a member of the "Dobrodetel" society in Ruse, which focused primarily on women's education and cultural emancipation. She served as its president from 1908 to 1911.

Dimitrana Ivanova also worked as a nurse during the Balkan Wars (1912-1913).

In 1914, she married the teacher Doncho Ivanov, but continued her professional life (the ban against married women teachers having been lifted in 1904). She was the mother of three children, born in 1916, 1917, and 1918.

In 1921, she applied again to study in the Faculty of Law at the University of Sofia, and was allowed to do so, graduating in 1927.

After September 9, 1944, Dimitrana Ivanova's life took a dramatic turn. On September 28, 1944, she was arrested by the new communist regime (People's Republic of Bulgaria) on suspicion of pro-German and pro-fascist sympathies due to her extensive contacts with Germany. She was released after four months on the condition that she leave Sofia and settled in Ruse. Later, she returned to Sofia.

Dimitrana Ivanova died on May 29, 1960, in Sofia at the age of 79.

=== Women's rights activism ===
In June 1911, Dimitrana Ivanova was a delegate at the congress of the Bulgarian Women's Union (Българския женски съюз), where constitutional provisions regarding women's voting rights were discussed.

She was actively involved in addressing issues related to the family, the roles of wives and mothers, and social protection for maternity and childhood.

She was as well a member of the Society for Combating Juvenile Delinquency and, in 1925, she helped establish the Society for the Protection of Children (Дружество за защита на децата) and served on its board of directors until 1935.

In the early 1920s, already an active and committed activist, she determined that a legal education could support her efforts and help advance the cause of women's equal rights. She tried to enroll in the Faculty of Law at Sofia University, but her application was rejected because she "had not completed her secondary education" (Bulgarian high schools had recently been extended to eight grades, while she had finished a six-grade school). Determined, she resolved to fight "against the injustices faced by women and against formalism." Eventually, after completing the eighth grade, she enrolled in law school and graduated successfully in 1927.

Dimitrana Ivanova started publishing and editing the monthly magazine The Woman (1929-1931), where she explored legal issues surrounding the subordinate status of women. She also wrote for various newspapers on topics related to the lives and future of women.

From 1926 to 1944, she led the Bulgarian Women's Union, following Julia Malinova's tenure. She was a strong advocate for gender equality in education and for women's right to work as lawyers and judges. Therefore, under her presidency, two issues received particular attention: the permission for women to practice law, seen as a significant symbolic issue representing women's right to access other similar professions, and women's right to vote. Finally, after a lengthy fight, she became one of the first Bulgarian women to gain the right to work as a lawyer or a judge. Moreover, in 1937, married, divorced, and widowed women over the age of 21 gained the right to vote in municipal elections, although they were not allowed to run for office. It was the first step toward securing the right to vote for all women in 1944.

From 1935 to 1940, she was a member of the board of the International Alliance of Women.

She became a well-known controversial figure in public debate and was frequently caricatured in the press.
