= Julia Malinova =

Bulgarian suffragist and women's rights activist

- Born: Jakovlevna Scheider; 1869
- Died: 1953 (aged 83–84)
- Occupation: Women's rights activist
- Known for: co-founder of the Bulgarian Women's Union
- Spouse: Alexander Malinov

Julia Malinova, née Jakovlevna Scheider (Bulgarian: Юлия Малинова (Яковлевна Шнайдер)) (1869-1953), was a Bulgarian suffragist and women's rights activist. She was co-founder of the Bulgarian Women's Union, and served as its chairperson twice: in 1908-1910, and from 1912 to 1926.

== Life ==
Malinova was born in 1869, a Russian Jew, educated in France and Switzerland before moving to Bulgaria upon her conversion and marriage to lawyer Alexander Malinov, later prime minister of Bulgaria.

From 1899, she edited the paper Zhenski glas ("Female voice") with the teacher, socialist and writer Anna Karima, spouse of the socialist Yanko Sakazov, and in 1901, they co-founded the Bulgarian Women's Union with Karima as its first chairperson. The organization was an umbrella organization of the 27 local women's organisations that had been established in Bulgaria since 1878. It was founded as a reply to the limitations of women's education and access to university studies in the 1890s, with the goal to further women's intellectual development and participation, arranged national congresses and used Zhenski glas as its organ.

In 1908, she succeeded as chairperson, and made the Bulgarian Women's Union part of the International Council of Women. During her tenure, she secured the policy of the union as a society for all classes and political convictions, and organized wives of soldiers during the war.

In 1925, she was attacked by Bulgarian nationalist women for her foreign origin. She retired as chairperson in 1926 and was succeeded by Dimitrana Ivanova. Malinova died in 1953.
