= Bulgarian National Women's Union =

State women's organization in Communist Bulgaria

Bulgarian National Women's Union or Bulgarian People’s Women’s Union, was a state women's organization in Communist Bulgaria, founded in 1945. It was a state organization and a branch of the Communist Party.

== History ==
The Bulgarian National Women's Union was founded after the Communist takeover in 1945, under the leadership of Tsola Dragoycheva (Chair in 1945-1950). It incorporated the other women's organizations in Bulgaria.

Its purpose was to mobilise women in the political ideology of the state, as well as to enforce the party's policy within gender roles and women's rights. It played an important role in the life of women in the state during its existence. The Party policy was gender equality; legal equality was ensured and the "resolution" of the women's issue was proclaimed.

The official party policy was to support women's representation on political and professional level, and women were encouraged to become active in party politics. However, while women's political participation within the party did reach 34 percent, only five percent was on national and high level positions.
