= Anna Karima =

Bulgarian writer, translator, editor, journalist, suffragist and women's rights activist

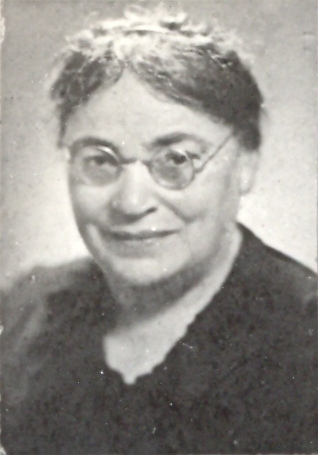
- Born: Todora Velkova; 1871
- Died: 1949 (aged 77–78)
- Occupations: Writer, Suffragist
- Spouse: Yanko Sakazov (m. 1888)

Anna Karima, née Todora Velkova (in Bulgarian: Анна Тодорова Велкова) (1871–1949), was a Bulgarian writer, translator, editor, journalist, suffragist and women's rights activist. She was co-founder of the Bulgarian Women's Union, and served as its chairperson from 1901 to 1906.

== Biography ==
Anna Karima was born in 1871 in Berdyansk, Ukraine. She was the daughter of wheat trader and revolutionary Todor Velkov (bg:Тодор Велков).

She completed her secondary education in Sofia.

In 1888, she married the socialist politician Yanko Sakazov, with whom she later separated. From this marriage, she had three children.

She debuted and became known as a writer in 1891. From a young age, Karima devoted herself to writing and dramaturgy. She wrote short stories, narratives, and novels. Her first story, titled Obiknovenna istoria (in Bulgarian: Обикновена история, Ordinary Story), was published in 1891 in the magazine Den. Between 1892 and 1895, she served as well as the editor-in-chief of the Bulgarian magazine Pochivka.

Her plays, including Podhlyznase (in Bulgarian: Подхлъзна се, She Stumbled), Zaguben zhivot (in Bulgarian: Загубен живот, A Lost Life), and Nad zida (in Bulgarian: Над зида, Above the Wall), are performed on the stage of the National Theatre in Sofia, Bulgaria's premier theatrical institution. Another of her plays, titled V Balkanak (in Russian: В Балканах, In the Balkans), was written in Russian and staged in Saint Petersburg.

In 1894, the family moved to Sofia, where she became active in social reform. She is involved in public activism, advocating for women's equality in society. In 1897, she founded the society Suznanie (Conscience) and started to campaign for women's education, one of which was to have the University of Sofia open to women.

In 1899, she edited the paper Zhenski glas (Female voice) with Julia Malinova, and in 1901, they co-founded the Bulgarian Women's Union with Karima as its first chairperson. The organization was an umbrella organization of the 27 local women's organisations that had been established in Bulgaria since 1878. It was founded as a reply to the limitations of women's education and access to university studies in the 1890s, with the goal for furthering women's intellectual development and participation, arranging national congresses and using Zhenski glas as its printed publication.

In 1906, she left the Bulgarian Women's Union. She founded the rival women's organization Ravnopravie (Equal rights, 1908–1921) and toured the country lecturing on women's rights reform.

In 1916, she opened the first commercial school for girls in Bulgaria, located in Sofia. During the wars in the Balkan (1912–1918), she became involved in charitable activities. She played a key role in establishing a boarding school for orphans and an association for disabled individuals.

In 1917, Karima became the editor of the newspaper Bulgarka (in Bulgarian: Българка), a women's press outlet.

In 1918, she opened the first day care center for working mothers in Bulgaria.

She was exiled for political reasons from 1921 to 1928. After the bombing of the Sveta Nedelya Church in 1925, Karima emigrated first to France. On August 15, 1926, she wrote an Appeal for Peace – For Bulgaria and sent it to all members of the League of Nations in Geneva. She maintained contact with the French communist Henri Barbusse, providing him with documents for the writing of his anti-fascist book Les Bourreaux (The Executioners), which she later translated and edited. Excerpts from her speeches and writings were published in Communist Flag (in Bulgarian: Комунистическо знаме), the press organ of the Bulgarian Communist Party (BKP) abroad. Due to her activities, Karima was implicated under the State Protection Law (Zakon za zashtita na darzhavata, in Bulgarian: Закон за защита на държавата), enacted by the government of Professor Aleksandar Tsankov. This controversial law was designed to suppress political opponents and movements perceived as threats to the state. At the end of 1926, Karima departed for the Soviet Union. Upon her return to Bulgaria in 1928, she published the book In Today's Russia (in Bulgarian: В днешна Русия, V dneshna Rousiya), where she shared her impressions of life in the Soviet Union.

In 1930, Karima became the editor of the newspaper Povik (in Bulgarian: Повик, The Call). She died on March 6, 1949, in Sofia, Bulgaria.
