= List of suffragists and suffragettes =

People who campaigned for women's right to vote

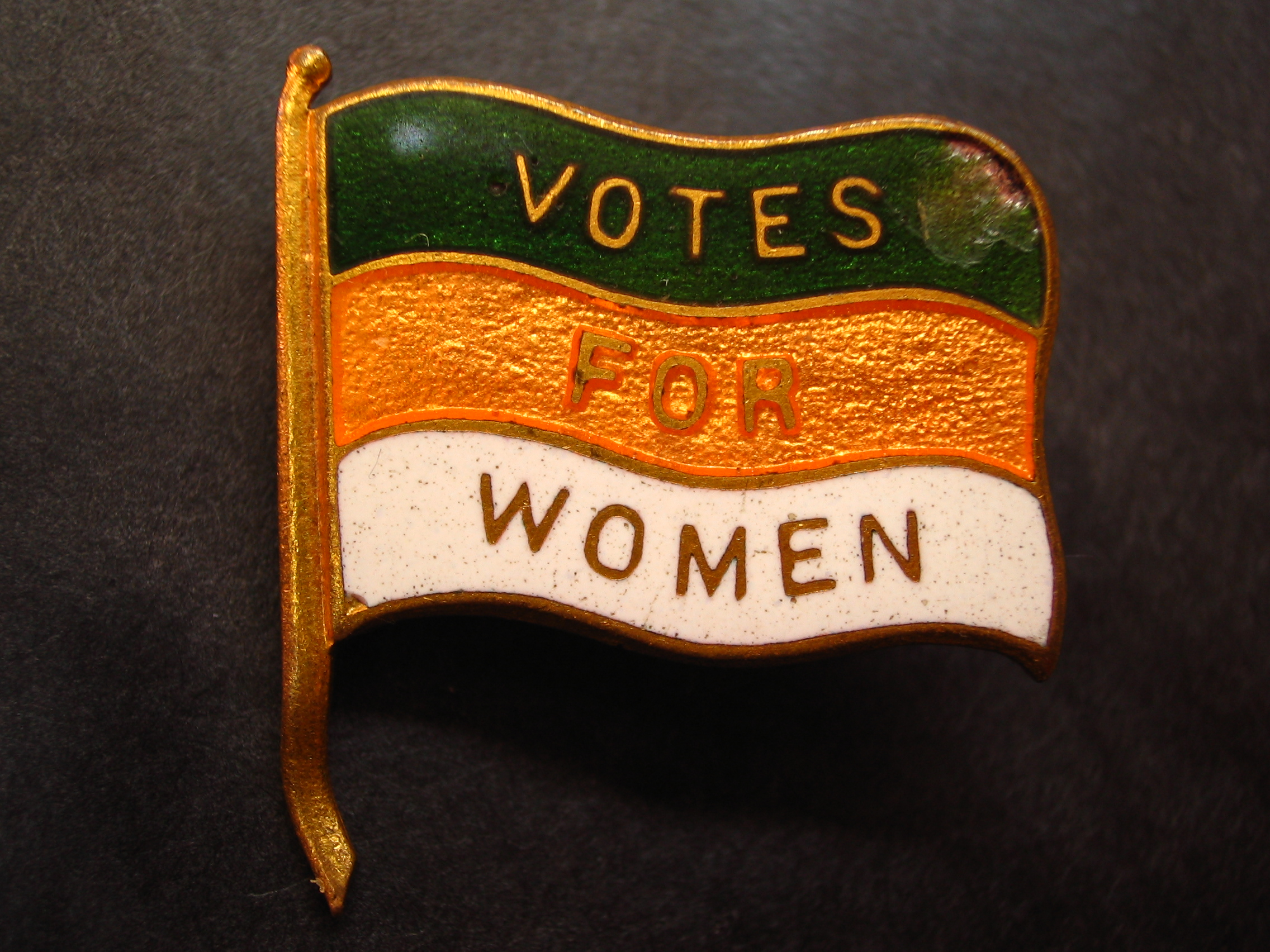
British Women's Social and Political Union lapel pin

This list of suffragists and suffragettes includes noted individuals active in the worldwide women's suffrage movement who have campaigned or strongly advocated for women's suffrage, the organisations which they formed or joined, and the publications which publicized – and, in some nations, continue to publicize– their goals. Suffragists and suffragettes, often members of different groups and societies, used or use differing tactics. Australians called themselves "suffragists" during the nineteenth century while the term "suffragette" was adopted in the earlier twentieth century by some British groups after it was coined as a dismissive term in a newspaper article. "Suffragette" in the British or Australian usage can sometimes denote a more "militant" type of campaigner, while suffragists in the United States organized such nonviolent events as the Suffrage Hikes, the Woman Suffrage Procession of 1913, the Silent Sentinels, and the Selma to Montgomery march. US and Australian activists most often preferred to be called suffragists, though both terms were occasionally used.

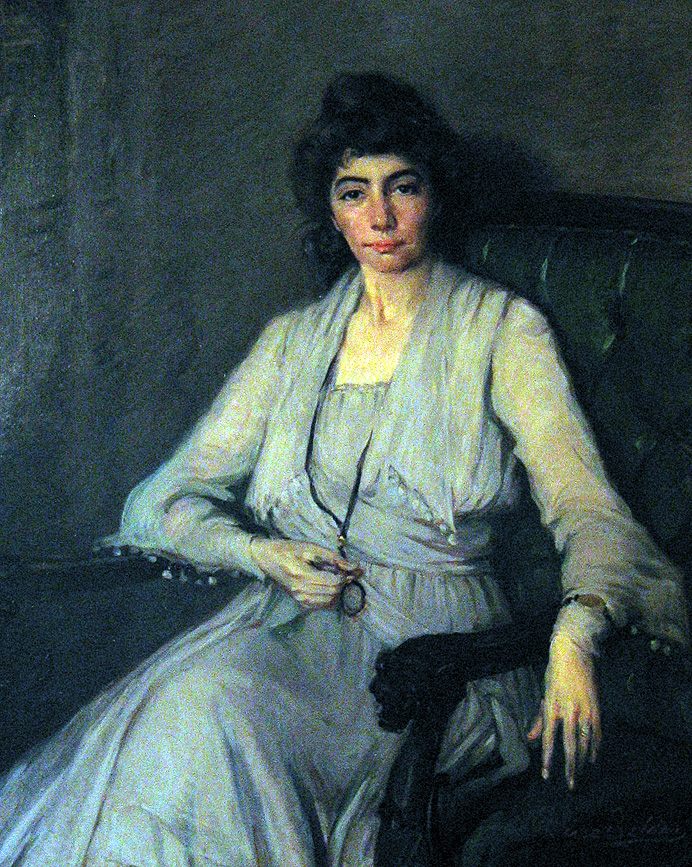
Madelin "Madge" Breckinridge

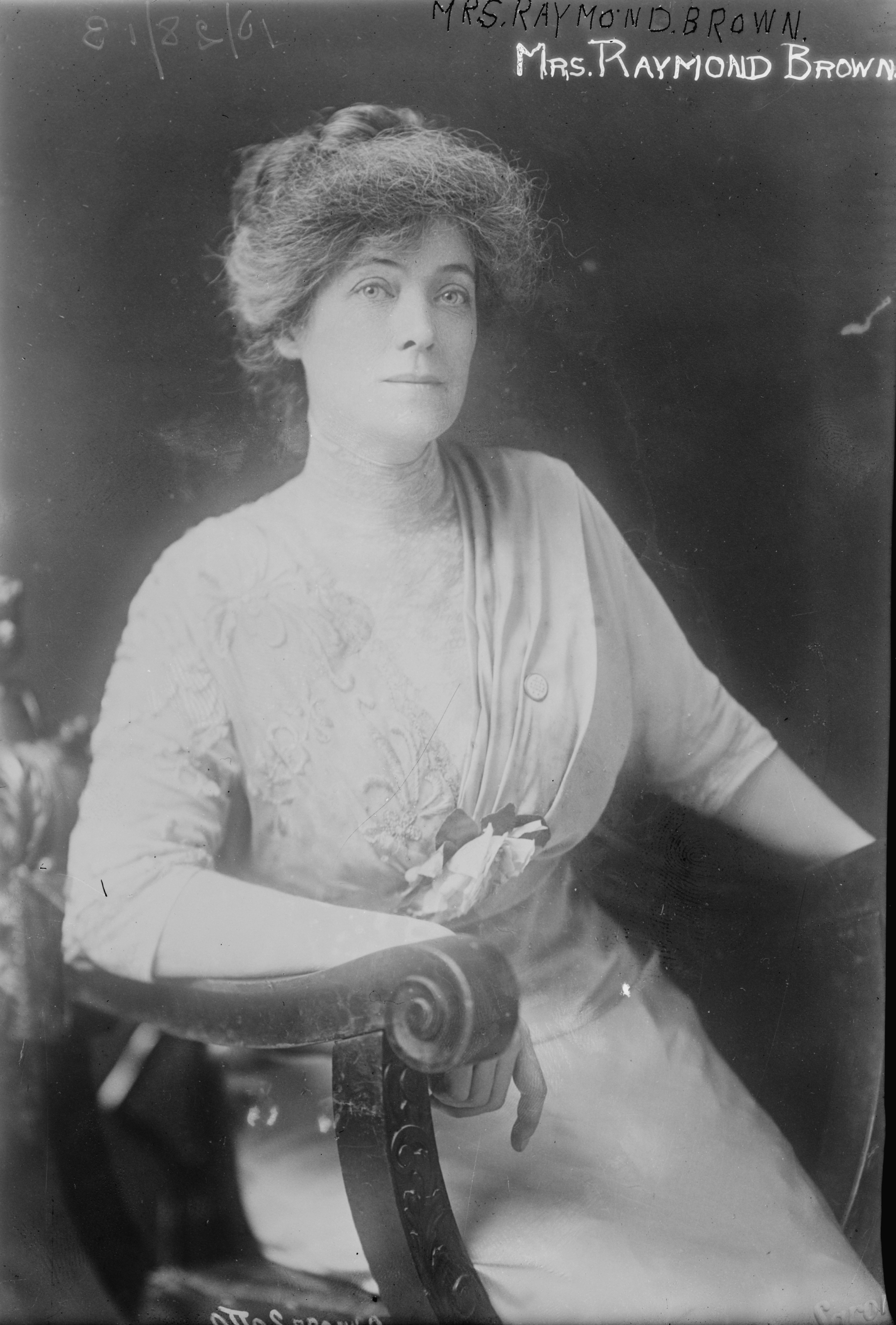
Gertrude Foster Brown

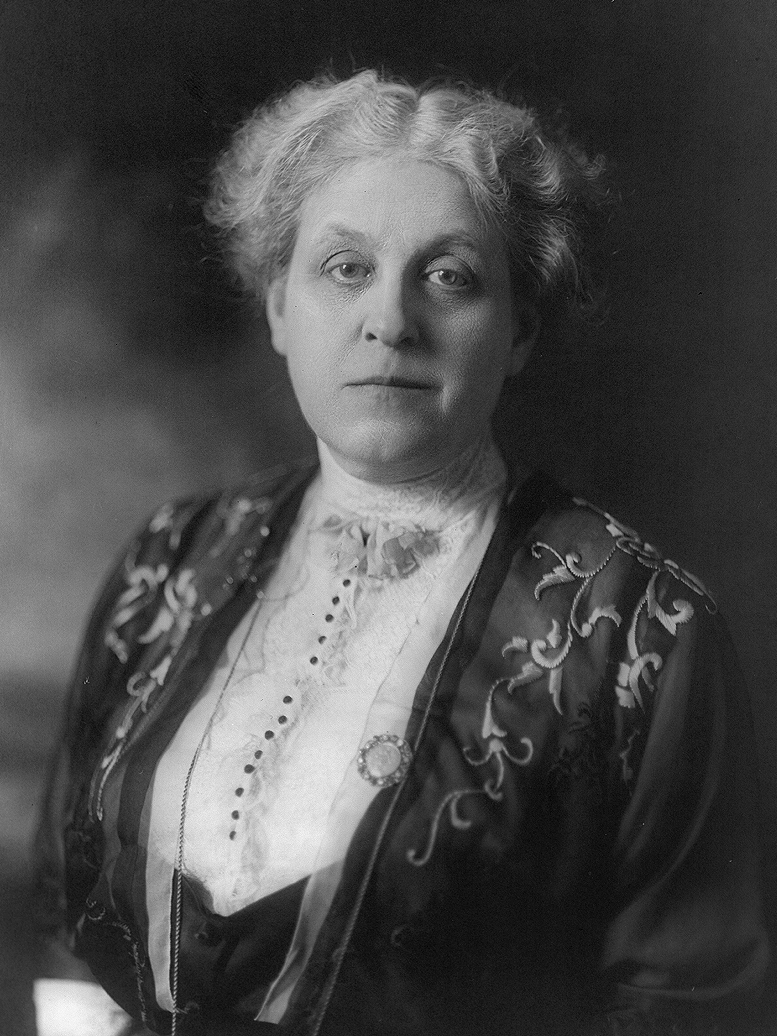
Carrie Chapman Catt

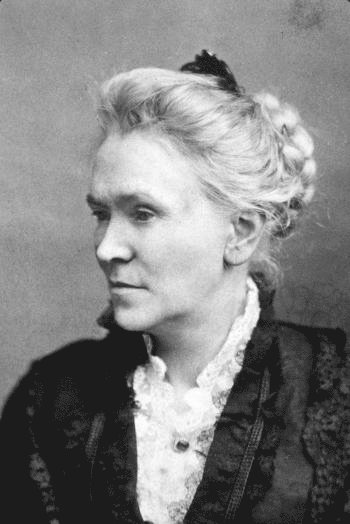
Matilda Joslyn Gage

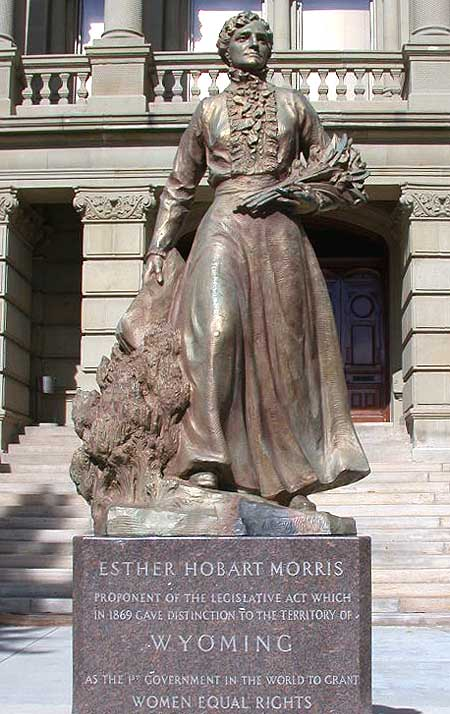
Statue of Esther Hobart Morris, located at the front exterior of the Wyoming State Capitol

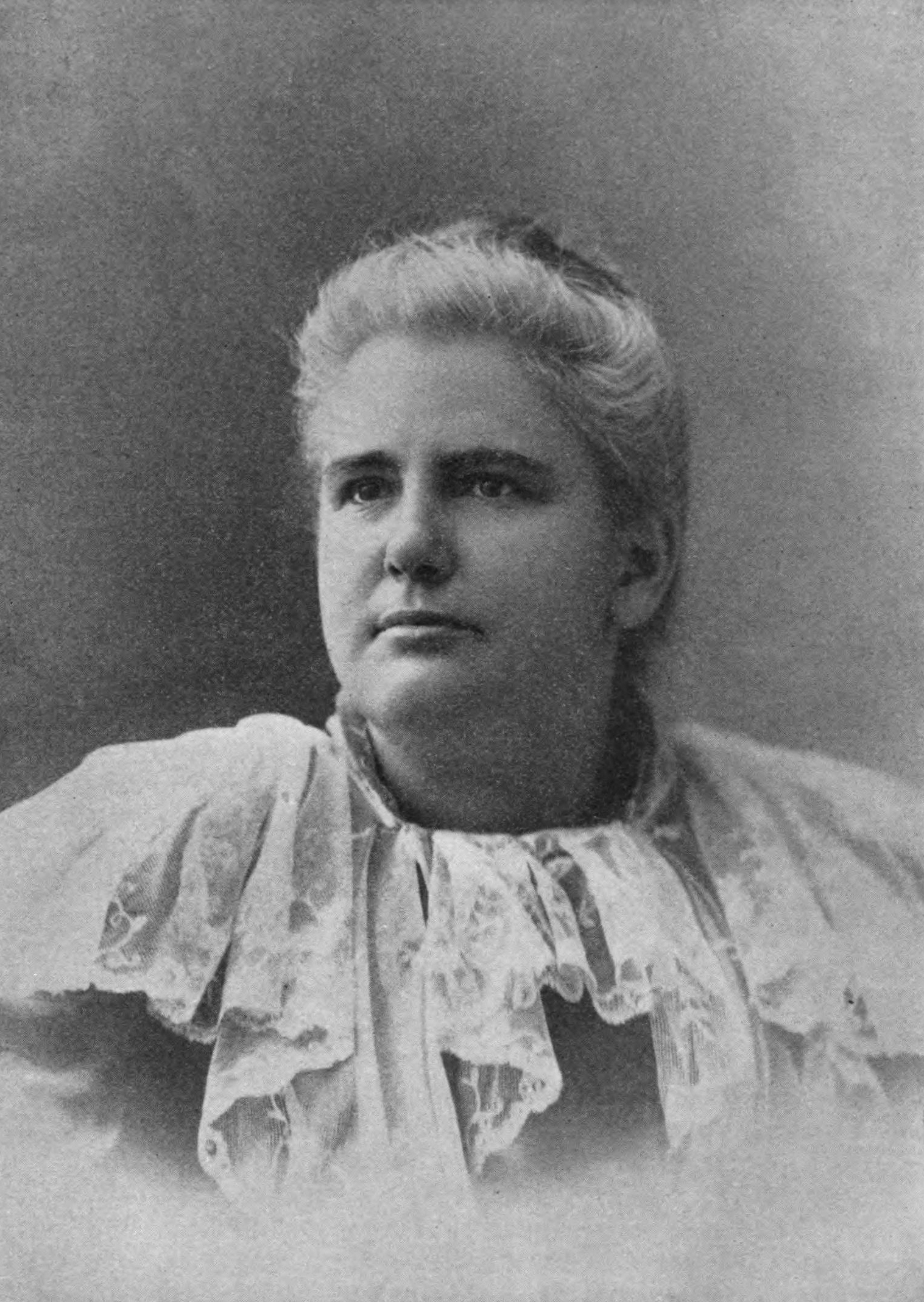
Anna Howard Shaw

Sojourner Truth

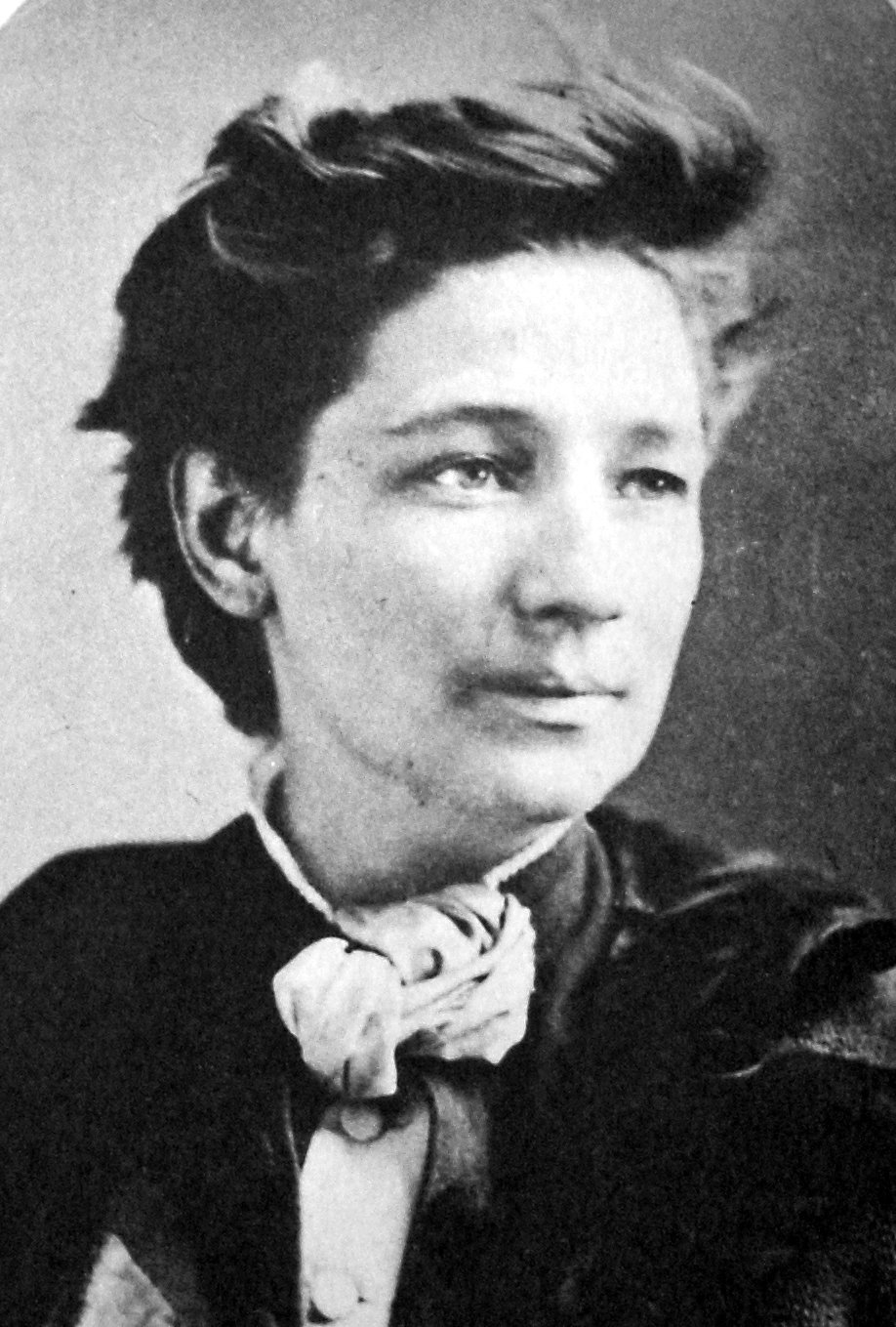
Victoria Woodhull

== Africa ==
=== Egypt ===
- Regina Khayatt (1881–?) – educator, philanthropist, feminist, suffragist, and temperance worker; co-founder of the Egyptian Feminist Union (EFU)
- Saiza Nabarawi (1897–1985) – journalist and attendee of the 9th Conference of the International Woman Suffrage Alliance
- Doria Shafik (1908–1975) – feminist, poet and editor who went on an eight-day hunger strike at Egypt's press syndicate in protest of the creation of a constitutional committee without any women
- Huda Sha'arawi (1879–1947) – feminist, activist, nationalist, revolutionary, co-founder of the EFU

=== Kenya ===
- Isabel Abraham Ross (1885–1964) – suffragist and campaigner with the East Africa Women's League (EAWL)

=== Nigeria ===
- Funmilayo Ransome-Kuti (1900–1978) – educator and activist who fought for women's enfranchisement and political representation
- Gambo Sawaba (1933–2001) - widely regarded as the pioneer of fighting for the liberation of northern women
- Tanimowo Ogunlesi - co-founder of the National Council of Women's Societies
- Wuraola Esan (1909–1985) - educator and advocate for women in traditional and legislative spaces

=== South Africa ===
- Annie Botha (1864–1937) – political hostess, wife of the first Prime Minister of South Africa and suffragist, co-founder of the South African Women's Federation
- Zainunnisa Gool (1897–1963) – lawyer and civil rights activist, and after white women only were granted the vote in 1930, founder of the League for the Enfranchisement of Non-European Women in 1938
- Anna Petronella van Heerden (1887–1975) – campaigned for women's suffrage in the 1920s and the first Afrikaner woman to qualify as a medical doctor
- Mary Emma Macintosh (died 1916) – suffragist and the first President of the Women's Enfranchisement Association of the Union
- Mabel Malherbe (1879–1964) – suffragist and politician, first woman mayor of Pretoria and first woman to be a member of the South African Parliament
- Charlotte Maxeke (1871–1939) – religious leader, suffragist and the first black South African woman to graduate from a university, founded the Bantu Women’s League
- Jessie Rose-Innes (1860–1943) – nurse, social campaigner and suffragist of British descent, elected chair of the Cape Town branch of the National Council for Women
- Olive Schreiner (1855–1920) – writer, suffragist and co-founder of the Cape Women's Enfranchisement League, left the Women's Enfranchisement League (WEL) when they refused to support the vote for black African women
- Jessie M. Soga (1870–1954) – singer, music teacher and suffragist
- Julia Solly (1862–1953) – British-born South African feminist, temperance activist and suffragist who co-founded Cape Women's Enfranchisement League and helped acquire the vote for white women only in 1930
- Daisy Solomon (1882–1978) – suffragist who campaigned in South Africa and Britain, daughter of Georgiana Solomon
- Emilie Solomon (1859–1939) – suffragist and president of the Cape Woman's Christian Temperance Union, niece of Georgiana Solomon
- Georgiana Solomon (1844–1933) – Scottish-born educator and suffragist, co-founder of the South African Women's Federation
- Lady Barbara Steel (1857–1943) – suffragist and member of the Women's Enfranchisement Association of the Union, helped acquire the vote for white women only in 1930

== Asia ==
=== China ===
- Lin Zongsu (Chinese: 林宗素; 1878–1944) – journalist and founder of the first organization in China seeking women's enfranchisement, the Women's Suffrage Comrades Alliance (Chinese: 女子参政同志会)
- Tang Qunying (Chinese: 唐群英; 1871–1937) – co-founder and chairwoman of the Women's Suffrage Alliance (Chinese: 女子参政同盟会) and founder of Women’s Rights Daily, Hunan's first newspaper for women
- Wang Changguo (Chinese: 王昌國; 1880–1949) – co-founder of the Women's Suffrage Alliance (Chinese: 女子参政同盟会) and promoter of Hunan Changsha Women's National Association
- Zhang Hanying (Chinese: 張漢英; 1872–1915) – co-founder of the Women's Suffrage Alliance (Chinese: 女子参政同盟会)
- Zhang Mojun (Chinese: 張默君; 1884–1965) – military commander, suffragist, and the first female member of the Kuomintang Central Committee

=== India ===
- Kumudini Basu (1873–1942) – social reformer, freedom fighter and suffragist, one of the leaders of the Nigil Bangiya Nari Votadhikar Samiti (All Bengali Women's Franchise Association) which fought for women's suffrage
- Annie Besant (1847–1933) – British socialist, theosophist, women's rights activist, writer, orator, educationist, philanthropist
- Kamaladevi Chattopadhyay (1903–1988) – secretary of the All-India Women's Conference (AIWC) and the first woman to run for a legislative seat in India
- Margaret "Gretta" Cousins (1878–1954) – Irish-Indian suffragist, founder of the All India Women's Conference and co-founder of the Irish Women's Franchise League
- Amrit Kaur (1887–1964) – political activist and politician who testified before the Lothian Committee on universal Indian franchise and constitutional reforms
- Sheroo Keeka (1921–2006) – campaigned for 'Votes for Married Women' and chair of the Dodoma branch of the Tanganyika Council of Women
- Sarojini Naidu (1879–1949) – political activist and poet who became the first Indian woman to be president of the Indian National Congress
- Bhagwati Bhola Nauth (born c. 1882) – suffragist, marcher at the Women's Coronation Procession and honorary secretary of the Indian Women’s Educational Fund
- Lakshmibai Rajwade (1887–1984) – medical doctor, family planning advocate and committee member and secretary of the All India Women's Conference
- Hannah Sen (1894–1957) – politician and co-founder of the Indo-British Mutual Welfare League, a women's organization that established a network of British and Indian suffragists also involved in educational projects
- Bamba Sofia Jindan Duleep Singh (1869=1957) - suffragette, Indian independence activist
- Catherine Hilda Duleep Singh (1871–1942) – activist
- Sophia Alexandrovna Duleep Singh (1876-1948) - suffragette, leading member of the Women's Tax Resistance League, Indian independence activist
- Herabai Tata (1879–1941) – argued before British government commissions that suffrage should be extended in India

=== Indonesia ===
- Thung Sin Nio (1902–1996) – women's rights activist, physician, economist, politician

=== Iran ===
- Bibi Khanoom Astarabadi (1858/59–1921) – Iranian writer, satirist, founder of the first school for girls in the modern history of Iran and a pioneering figure in the women's movement of Iran
- Annie Basil (1911–1995) – Iranian-Indian activist for Armenian women
- Táhirih (1817–1852) – also known as Fatimah Baraghani, renowned poet, removed her veil in public, "first woman suffrage martyr"

=== Iraq ===
- Naziha al-Dulaimi (1923-2007), co-founder and the first president of the Iraqi Women's League
- Paulina Hassoun (1895–1969) was an Iraqi journalist and teacher, who was the first woman to found and publish a magazine in Iraq.

=== Japan ===
- Raicho Hiratsuka (1886–1971) co-founder of the New Women's Association
- Fusae Ichikawa (1893–1981) – politician who founded the nation's first women's suffrage organization: the Women's Suffrage League of Japan, president of the New Japan Women's League
- Oku Mumeo (1895–1997) – co-founder of the New Women's Association who later served three terms in Japan's Imperial Diet
- Tsuneko Akamatsu (1897 - 1965) - politician, member of the National district of the House of Councillors.
- Shigeri Yamataka (1899–1977) – founder of the League for the Defense of Women's Rights and the Women's Suffrage League
- Shidzue Katō (1897–2001) – politician
- Chizuko Ueno (1947 -)

=== Jordan ===
- Emily Bisharat (died 2004) – first female lawyer in Jordan, fought for women's suffrage

=== Kuwait ===
- Lulwah Al-Qatami (born 1933) – suffragist and educator, nominated for the Nobel prize

=== Lebanon ===
- Emily Fares Ibrahim (1914–2011) was an American-born Lebanese writer, poet, and feminist. She was the first woman to run for the elections in Lebanon after suffrage in 1952.

=== Philippines ===
- Josefa Llanes Escoda (1898–1945) – civic leader, suffragist and founder of the Girl Scouts of the Philippines who was memorialized on the Philippines' 1,000-Peso banknote
- Concepción Felix (1884–1967) – feminist and human rights activist
- Pura Villanueva Kalaw (1886–1954) – beauty queen, feminist, journalist, and writer
- Pilar Hidalgo-Lim (1893–1973) – educator and civic leader
- Natividad Almeda Lopez (1892–1977) – suffragist and the first female lawyer in the Philippines
- Josefa Jara Martinez (1894–1987) – social worker, suffragist and civic leader
- Geronima Pecson (1896–1989) – suffragist, educator and social worker who became the first woman senator of the Philippines in 1947
- Rosa Sevilla (1879–1954) – activist, educator, and journalist

=== Sri Lanka ===
- Drummond Shiels (1881–1953) – Scottish-born politician who supported the founding of the Women’s Franchise Union of Ceylon
- Mary Rutnam – Canadian-born doctor, gynaecologist, and suffragist who emigrated and became a member of the Women’s Franchise Union of Sri Lanka and a co-founder of the All-Ceylon Women's Conference
- Agnes de Silva (1885–1961) – secretary of the Women's Franchise Union of Ceylon then founder of the Women's Franchise Union of Sri Lanka

=== Syria ===
- Thuraya Al-Hafez (1911–2000) – suffragist and politician who campaigned against the niqab and founded women's organisations

=== Turkey ===
- Latife Bekir (1901–1952) – suffragist and president of the Turkish Women's Union
- Nezihe Muhiddin (1889–1958) – suffragist and founder of the Turkish Women's People Party, which demanded suffrage for women, and the Turkish Women's Union

=== Yishuv ===
- Rosa Welt-Straus (1856–1938) – suffragist and feminist

== Australia and Oceania ==
=== Australia ===
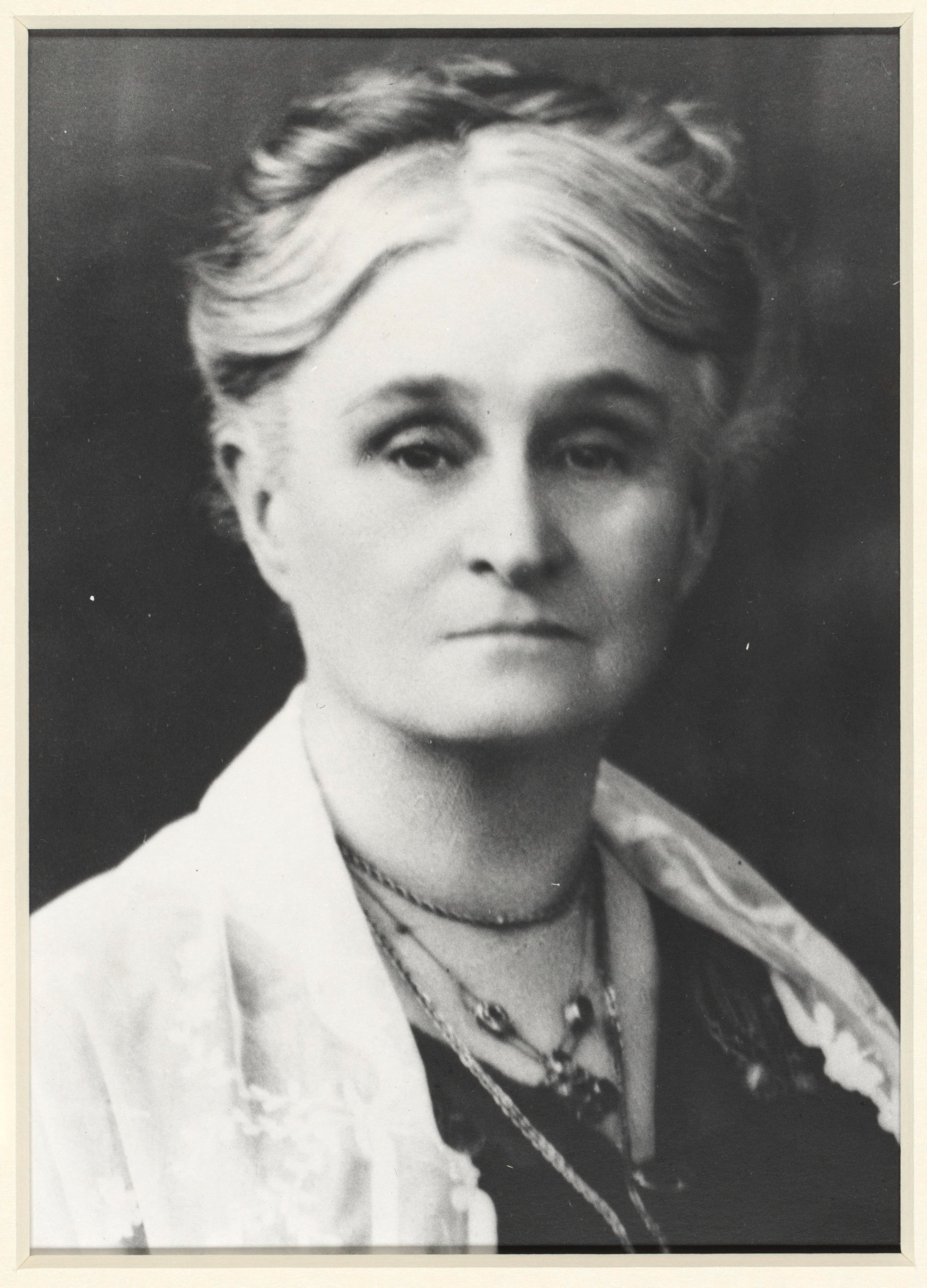
Edith Cowan

=== New Zealand ===
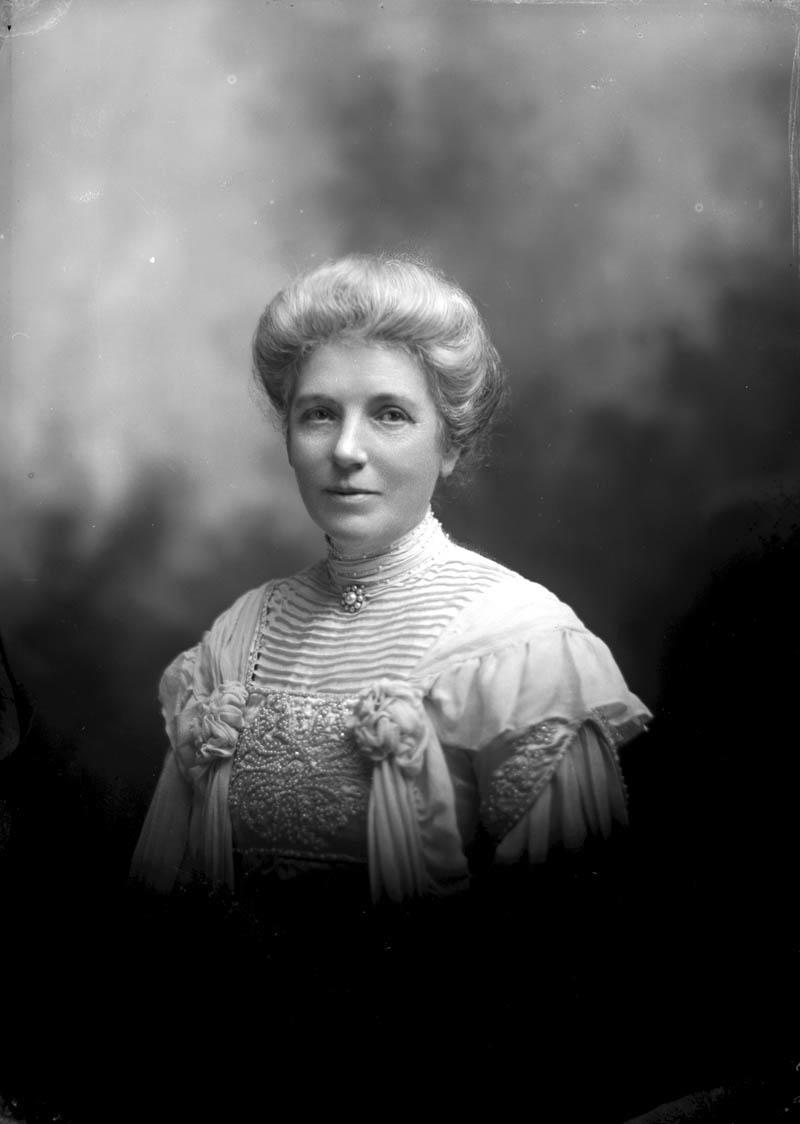
Kate Sheppard

== Europe ==
=== Albania ===
- Shaqe Çoba (1875–1954) – suffragist and publisher of a magazine that covered women's issues
- Parashqevi Qiriazi (1880–1970) – suffragist, teacher and founder of Yll' i Mengjesit, a women's association
- Sevasti Qiriazi (1871–1949) – Albanian patriot, suffragist, pioneer of female education and founder of Korça Girls School
- Urani Rumbo (1895–1936) – suffragist, teacher, playwright and founder of Lidhja e Gruas (Woman's Union)

=== Andorra ===
- Angelina Mas Joaniquet (1947–2026) – suffragist and businesswoman

=== Austria ===
- Marianne Hainisch (1839–1936) – founder and leader of the Austrian women's movement, mother of first President of Austria
- Ernestine von Fürth, (1877–1946) – co-founder of the New Viennese Women's Club, chairwoman of the Austrian Women's Suffrage Committee
- Friederike Mekler von Traunweis Zeileis (née Mautner von Markhof, 1872–1954) – founding member of the IWSA
- Rosa Welt-Straus (1856–1938) – first Austrian woman to earn a medical degree; representative to the International Woman Suffrage Alliance

=== Belgium ===
- Jane Brigode (1870–1952) – politician, member of the International Woman Suffrage Alliance
- Léonie de Waha (1836–1926) – Belgian feminist, philanthropist, educator and Walloon activist
- Isabelle Gatti de Gamond (1839–1905) – Belgian educator, feminist, suffragist and politician
- Marie Parent (1853–1934) – journal editor, temperance activist, feminist, suffragist and founder of the Parti Général des Femmes, the women’s party.
- Marie Popelin (1846–1913) – lawyer and early feminist political campaigner; worked for universal adult suffrage
- Louise van den Plas (1877–1968) – suffragist and founder of the first Christian feminist movement in Belgium

=== Bulgaria ===
- Vela Blagoeva (1859–1921) – journalist, teacher and women's rights activist
- Zheni Bozhilova-Pateva (1878–1955) – teacher, writer, and one of the most active women's rights activists of her era
- Dimitrana Ivanova (1881–1960) – reform pedagogue, women's rights activist
- Ekaterina Karavelova (1860–1947) – educator, translator, publicist, suffragist
- Anna Karima (1871–1949) – suffragist and women's rights activist
- Kina Konova (1872–1952) – publicist and suffragist
- Julia Malinova (1869–1953) – women's rights activist

=== Croatia ===
- Adela Milčinović (1878–1968) – Croatian feminist author, critic and suffragette

=== Cyprus ===
- Polyxeni Loizia (1855–1942)
- Persophone Papadopulou (1887–1948)

=== Czechia ===
- Karla Máchová (1853–1920) – women's rights activist who, in 1908, was among the first three women to run for the Bohemian Diet
- Františka Plamínková (1875–1942) – founded the Committee for Women's Suffrage (Czech: Výbor pro volební právo ženy) in 1905 and served as a vice president of the International Council of Women, as well as the International Woman's Suffrage Alliance
- Marie Tůmová (1866–1925) –– women's suffragist who, in 1908, was among the first three women to run for the Bohemian Diet
- Zdeňka Wiedermannová-Motyčkova (1868–1915) – founder of the Provincial Organization of Progressive Moravian Women

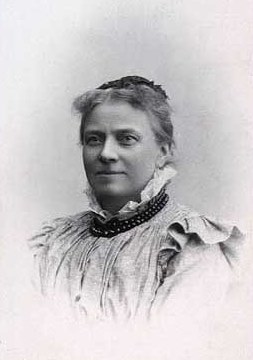
Matilde Bajer

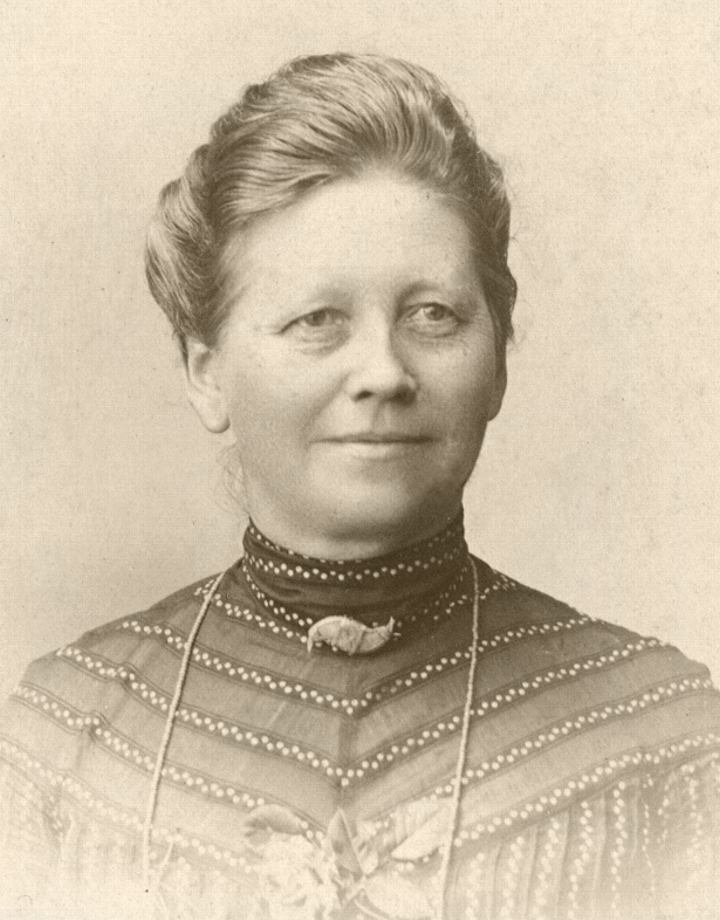
Eline Hansen

=== Finland ===
- Maikki Friberg (1861–1927) – educator, journal editor, suffragist and peace activist
- Annie Furuhjelm (1859–1937) – journalist, feminist activist and politician
- Alexandra Gripenberg (1857–1913) – writer, newspaper publisher, suffragist, women's rights activist
- Lucina Hagman (1953–1946) – feminist, suffragist, early politician
- Hilda Käkikoski (1864–1912) – women's activist, suffragist, writer, schoolteacher, early politician
- Olga Oinola (1865–1949) – President of the Finnish Women Association

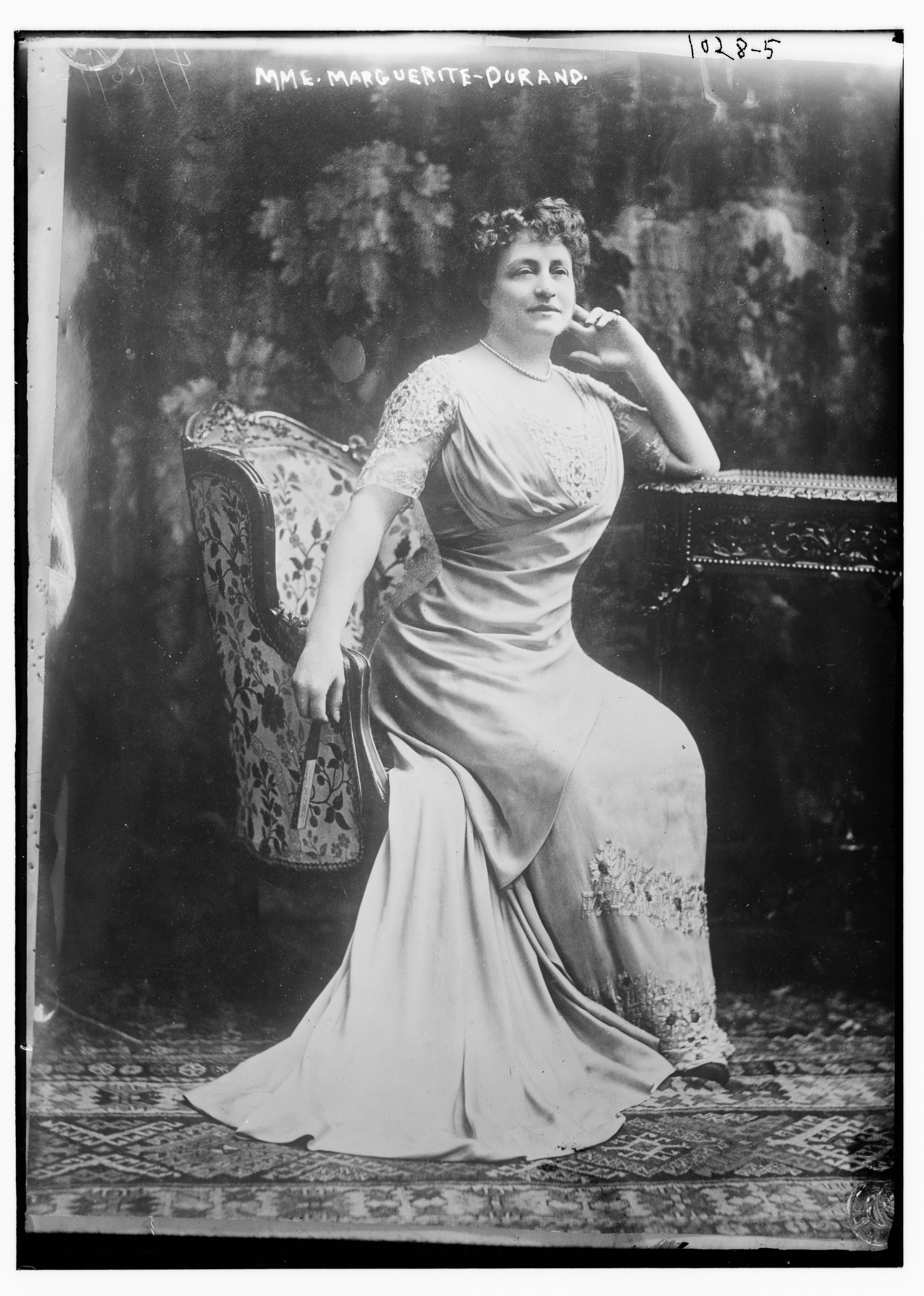
Marguerite Durand

=== Georgia ===
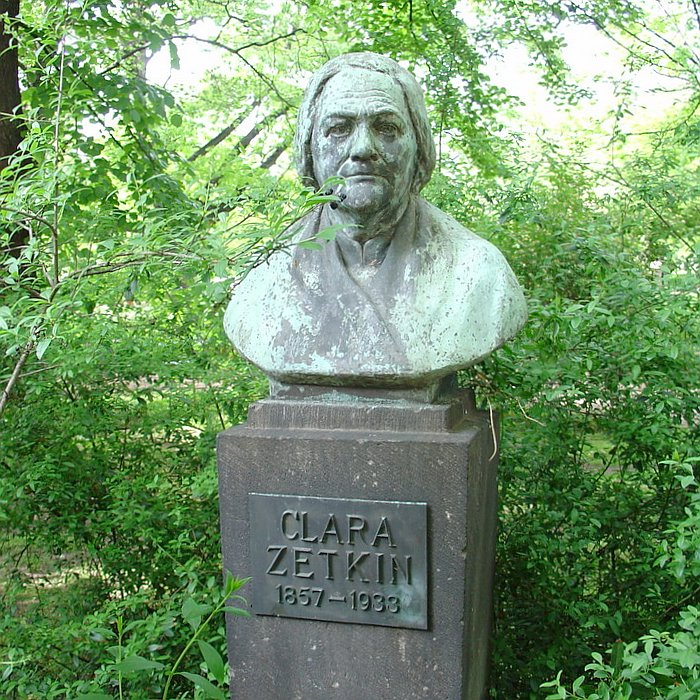
Bust of Clara Zetkin

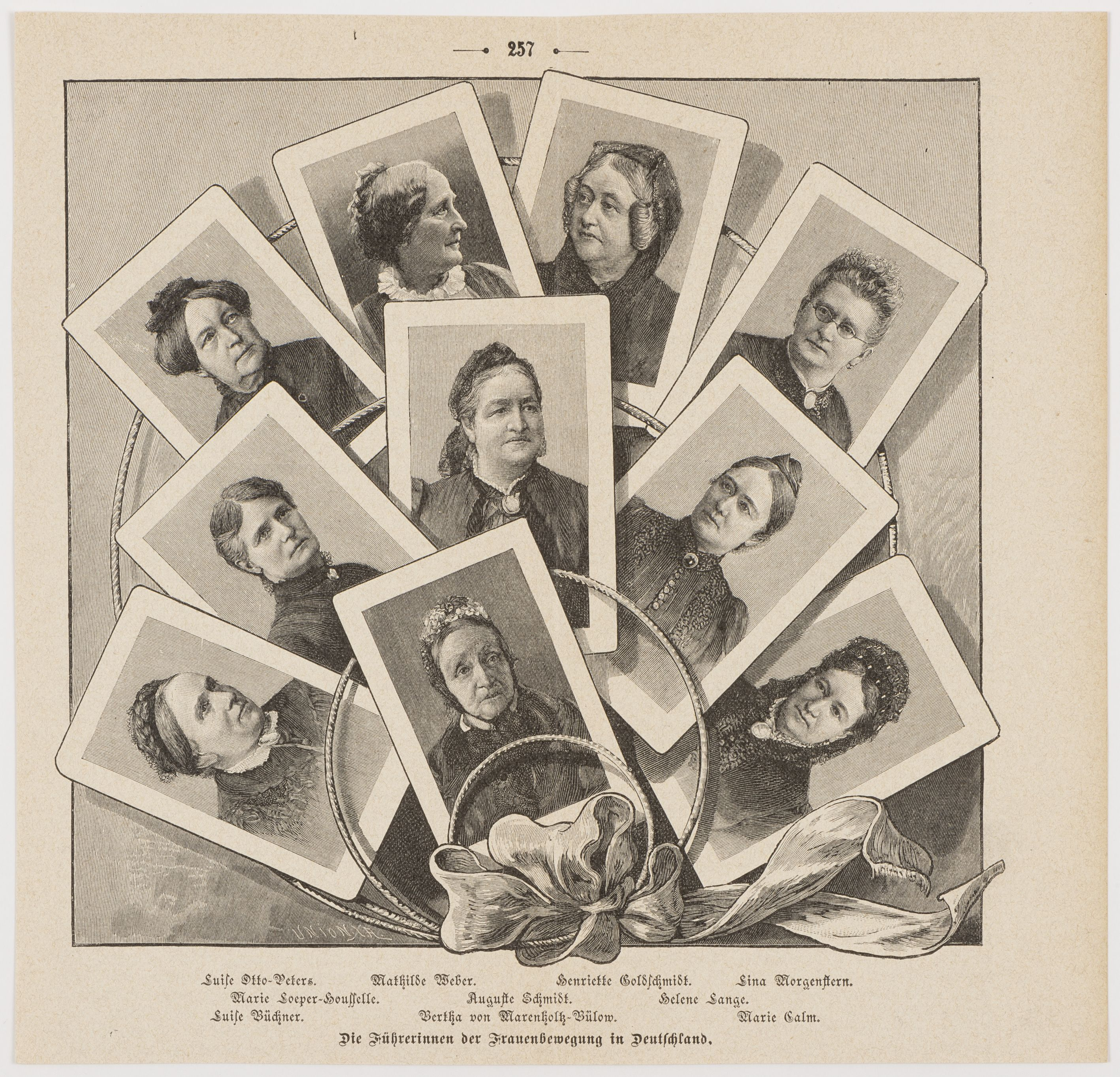
Leaders of the women's movement in Germany, 1894

=== Greece ===
- Kalliroi Parren (1861–1940) – journalist and founder of the Greek women's movement
- Avra Theodoropoulou (1880–1963) – music critic, pianist, suffragist, women's rights activist, nurse
- Lina Tsaldari (1887–1981) – suffragist and politician, president of the Greek Federation of Women's Unions and later the first female minister in Greece

=== Hungary ===
- Vilma Glücklich (1872–1927) – educator, pacifist, suffragist, feminist
- Eugénia Miskolczy Meller (1872– c. 1944/5) suffragist a co-founder of the Feminist Association
- Rosika Schwimmer (1877–1948) – pacifist, feminist and suffragist
- Adele Zay (1848–1928) – Transylvanian teacher, feminist and suffragist

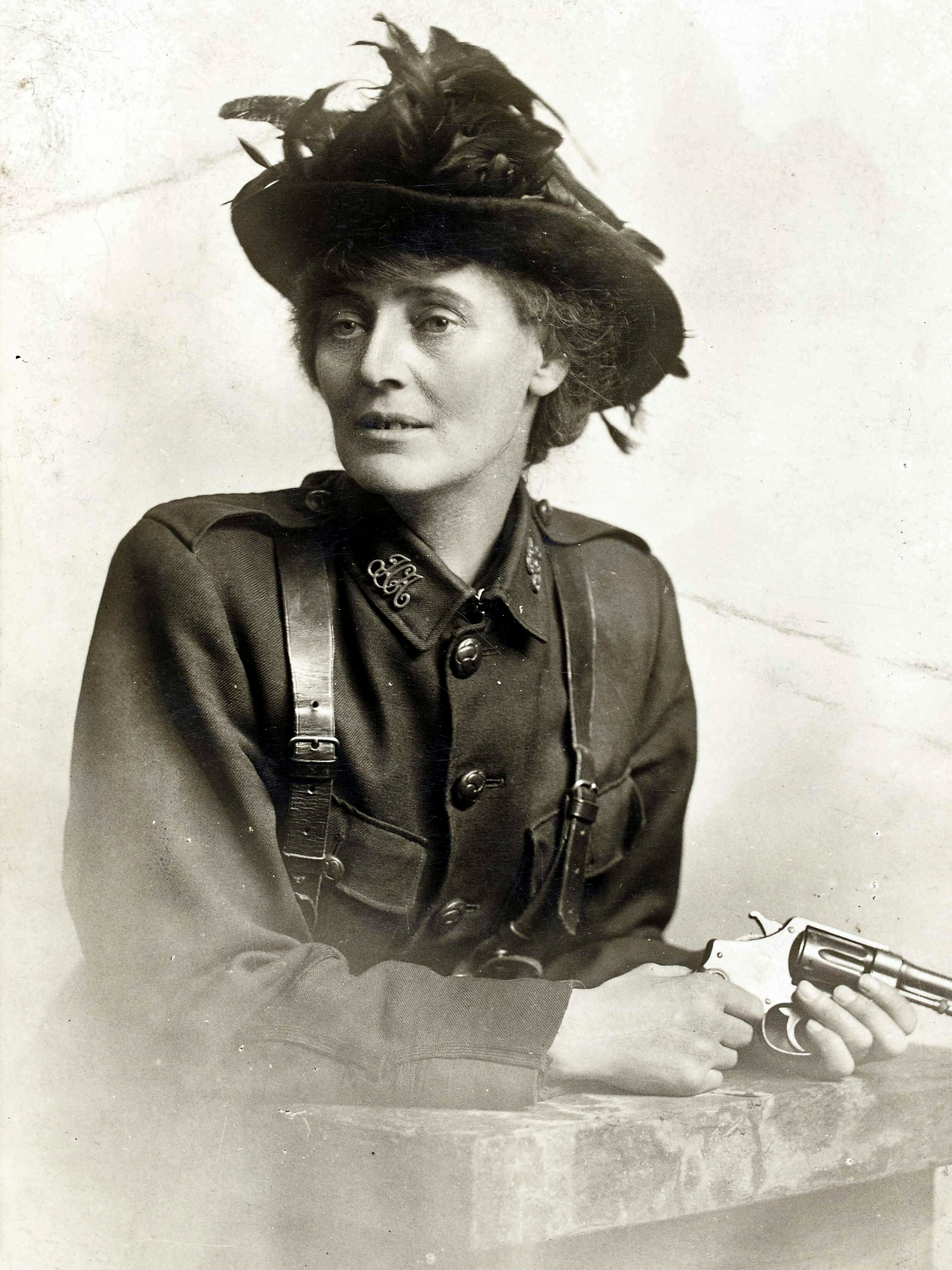
Constance Markievicz

=== Iceland ===
- Margret Benedictsson (1866–1956) Icelandic-Canadian suffragist and journalist
- Bríet Bjarnhéðinsdóttir (1856–1940) – founded Kvennablaðið, the first women's magazine in Iceland and, in 1907, the first suffrage organization in Iceland
- Ingibjörg H. Bjarnason (1867–1941) – politician, suffragist, schoolteacher, gymnast and leader of Iceland’s Women’s Rights Association
- Katrín Magnússon (1858–1932) – suffragist and promoter of women's education

=== Italy ===
- Elisa Agnini Lollini (1858–1922) – pioneering feminist, pacifist, suffragist and politician
- Margherita Ancona (1881–1966) – IWSA board member and delegate to the Inter-Allied Women's Conference
- Alma Dolens (1869–1948) – pacifist, suffragist and journalist, founder of several women's organizations
- Anna Kuliscioff (1857–1925) – Russian-born feminist, suffragist and politician active in Italy
- Linda Malnati (1855–1921) – influential women's rights activist, trade unionist, suffragist, pacifist and writer
- Anna Maria Mozzoni (1837–1920) – pioneering women's rights activist and suffragist
- Eugenia Rasponi (1873–1958) – suffragist, business woman, and early lesbian activist
- Ada Sacchi Simonetta (1874–1944) – women's rights activist, founder and leader of women's organizations
- Gabriella Rasponi Spalletti (1853–1931) – feminist, educator and philanthropist, founder of the National Council of Italian Women in 1903
- Alice Schiavoni Bosio (1871–1931) – delegate to both the 1915 Women at the Hague Conference and 1919 Inter-Allied Women's Conference

=== Liechtenstein ===
- Melitta Marxer (1923–2015) – one of the "Sleeping Beauties" who took the issue of women's suffrage to the Council of Europe in 1983

=== Luxembourg ===
- Catherine Schleimer-Kill (1884–1973) – suffragist and founder of Action féminine
- Marguerite Thomas-Clement (1886–1979) – politician who spoke in favour of women's suffrage in public debates and who became the first woman to serve in Luxembourg's parliament

=== Malta ===
- Helen Buhagiar (1888–1975) – suffragist and co-founder of the Women of Malta Association
- Mabel Strickland (1899–1988) – Anglo-Maltese journalist, suffragist and member of the Women of Malta Association
- Josephine Burns de Bono (1908–1996) – suffragist and co-founder of the Women of Malta Association

=== Norway ===
- Randi Blehr (1851–1928) – chairperson and co-founder of the Norwegian Association for Women's Rights
- Anna Bugge (1862–1928) – chairman of the Norwegian Association for Women's Rights, also active in Sweden
- Gudrun Løchen Drewsen (1867–1946) – Norwegian-born American women's rights activist and painter, promoted women's suffrage in New York City
- Betzy Kjelsberg (1866–1950) – co-founder of the Norwegian Association for Women's Rights (1884), the National Association for Women's Suffrage (1885)
- Gina Krog (1847–1916) – co-founder of the Norwegian Association for Women's Rights
- Ragna Nielsen (1845–1924) – chairperson of the Norwegian Association for Women's Rights
- Thekla Resvoll (1871–1948) – head of the Norwegian Female Student's Club and on the board of the women's suffrage movement (Kvinnestemmeretsforeningen)
- Anna Rogstad (1854–1938) – vice president of the Association for Women's Suffrage and Norway’s first female Member of Parliament
- Hedevig Rosing (1827–1913) – co-leader of the movement in Norway; author, educator, school founder

=== Poland ===
- Elżbieta Ciechanowska (1875–1948) - women's rights and labour activist, musician and poet
- Maria Dulębianka (1861–1919) – artist, activist and suffragist
- Władysława Habicht (1867–1963) – suffragette, social activist, and part of the housing cooperative movement.
- Paulina Kuczalska-Reinschmit (1859–1921) – founded the 'Związek Równouprawnienia Kobiet Polskich' ( Union for the Equal Rights of Polish Women)

=== Portugal ===
- Carolina Beatriz Ângelo (1878–1911) – physician, suffragist and a co-founder of the League of Republican Women which campaigned for women's emancipation and suffrage, became the first woman to vote in Portugal
- Adelaide Cabete (1867–1935) – suffragist and a co-founder of the League of Republican Women
- Maria Clara Correia Alves (1869–1948) –co-founder of the National Council of Portuguese Women and member of the League of Republican Women
- Maria Lamas (1893–1983) – writer, feminist, political prisoner
- Alice Moderno (1867–1946) – writer, feminist, active campaigner for women's rights and animals rights
- Ana de Castro Osório (1872–1935) – suffragist and a co-founder of the League of Republican Women
- Olga Morais Sarmento (1881–1948) – writer and feminist
- Sime Seruya (1876–1955) – suffragist and socialist, moved to Britain and was a cofounder of the Actresses' Franchise League
- Maria Evelina de Sousa (1879–1946) – educator, journalist, feminist, suffragist
- Maria Veleda (1871–1955) – educator, writer, suffragist and a co-founder of the League of Republican Women

=== Romania ===
- Maria Baiulescu (1860–1941) – Austro-Hungarian born Romanian writer, suffragist and the first woman to earn a degree in medicine in Romania
- Lotte Binder (1880–1930) – teacher and suffragist in Transylvania
- Calypso Botez (1880–1933) – writer and suffragist
- Ana Conta-Kernbach (1865–1921) – teacher, writer, women's rights activist, suffragist
- Eugenia de Reuss Ianculescu (1866–1938) – teacher, writer, women's rights activist, suffragist
- Clara Maniu (1842–1929) – feminist, suffragist
- Elena Meissner (1867–1940) – suffragist and professor of law at the University of Bucharest who headed the Asociația de Emancipare Civilă și Politică a Femeii Române

=== Russia ===
- Anna Kalmanovich – founder member of the Union for Women's Equality
- Olga Volkenstein (1875–1942) – committee member of the Union for Women's Equality, delegate to the International Woman Suffrage Alliance (IWSA) Congress in Copenhagen in 1906 and organiser of the first All-Russian Women's Congress

=== Serbia ===
- Draga Dejanović (1840–1871) – dubbed "the first Serbian suffragette"
- Helen Losanitch Frothingham (1885–1972) – nurse, humanitarian, feminist, suffrage campaigner
- Savka Subotić (1834–1918) – philanthropist and a leading feminist in the Serbian suffrage movement

=== Slovenia ===
- Pavla Hočevar (1889–1972) – teacher, writer, socialist and suffragist
- Alojzija Štebi (1883 –1956) – suffragist, founder of the Feminist Alliance of the Kingdom of Serbs, Croats and Slovenes, editor of the journal Ženski pokret (Women’s movement), and writer of paper Demokratizem in ženstvo (Democracy and womanhood) which argued for women's suffrage

=== Spain ===
- Concepción Arenal (1820–1893) – pioneer and founder of the feminist movement in Spain; activist, writer, journalist and lawyer
- Emilia Pardo Bazán (1851–1921) – Spanish writer, journalist, university professor and support for women's rights and education
- Carmen de Burgos (1867–1932) – Spanish journalist, writer, translator and women's rights activist
- Clara Campoamor (1888–1972) – Spanish politician and feminist best known for her advocacy for women's rights and suffrage during the writing of the Spanish constitution of 1931
- María Espinosa de los Monteros (1875–1946) – Spanish women's rights activist, suffragist and business executive
- Victoria Kent (1891–1987) – Spanish lawyer, suffragist and politician

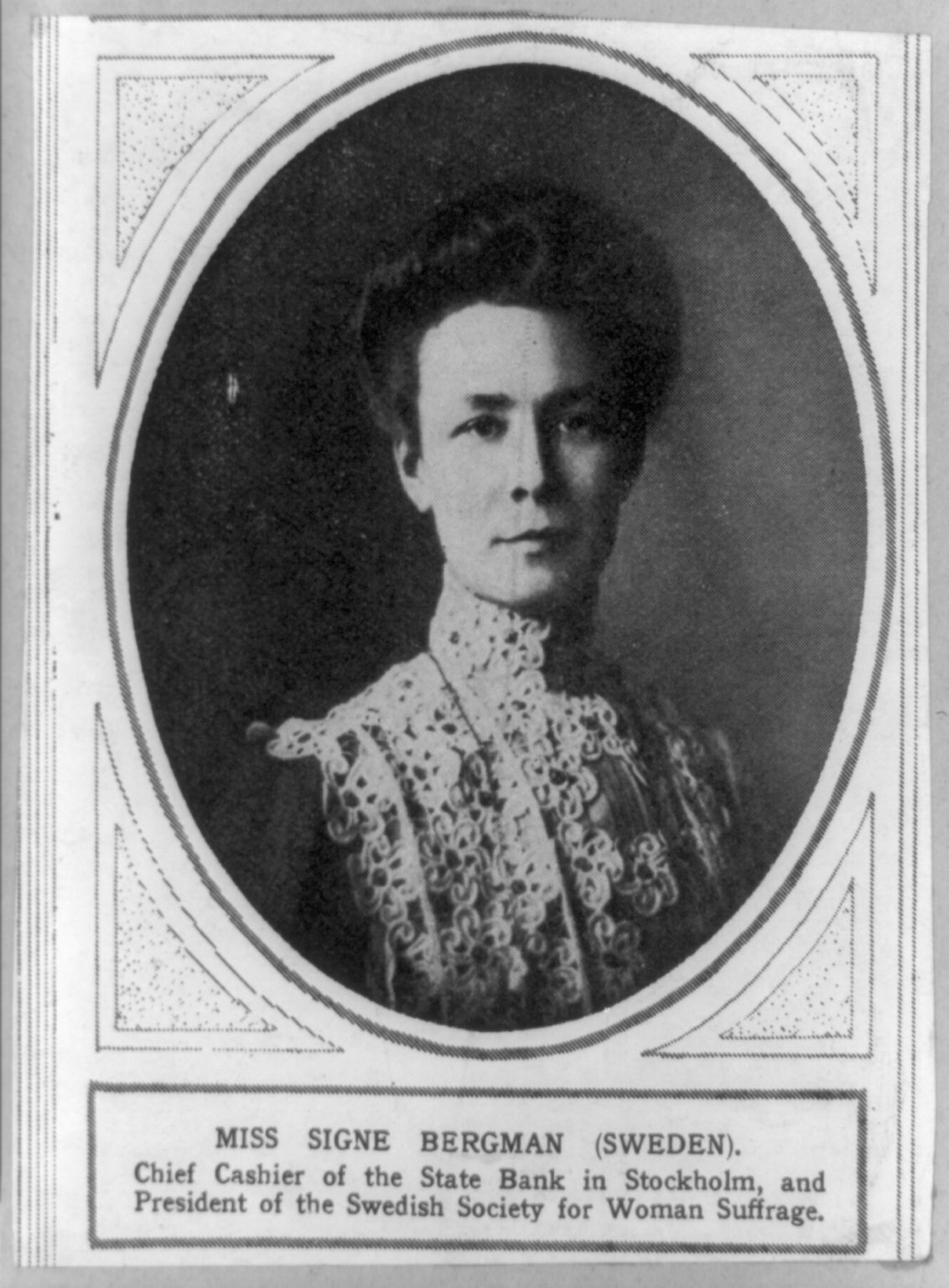
Signe Bergman

== North America ==
=== Bahamas ===
- Mary Ingraham (1901–1982) – co-founder and president of the Bahamian Women's Suffrage Movement
- Eugenia Lockhart (1908 – c. 1986) – secretary of the Bahamian Women’s Suffrage Movement and secretary of the Women’s Branch of the Progressive Liberal Party
- Georgianna Kathleen Symonette (1902–1965) – co-founder of the Bahamian Women's Suffrage Movement
- Mabel Walker (suffragist) (1902–1987) – American-Bahamian suffragist and co-founder of the Bahamian Women's Suffrage Movement

=== Barbados ===
- Nellie Weekes (1896–1990) – campaigner for women's involvement in politics, who ran for office in 1942, before women were allowed to vote in the country.

=== Bermuda ===
- Gladys Morrell (1888–1969) – suffragette leader and secretary of the Bermuda Women's Suffrage Society

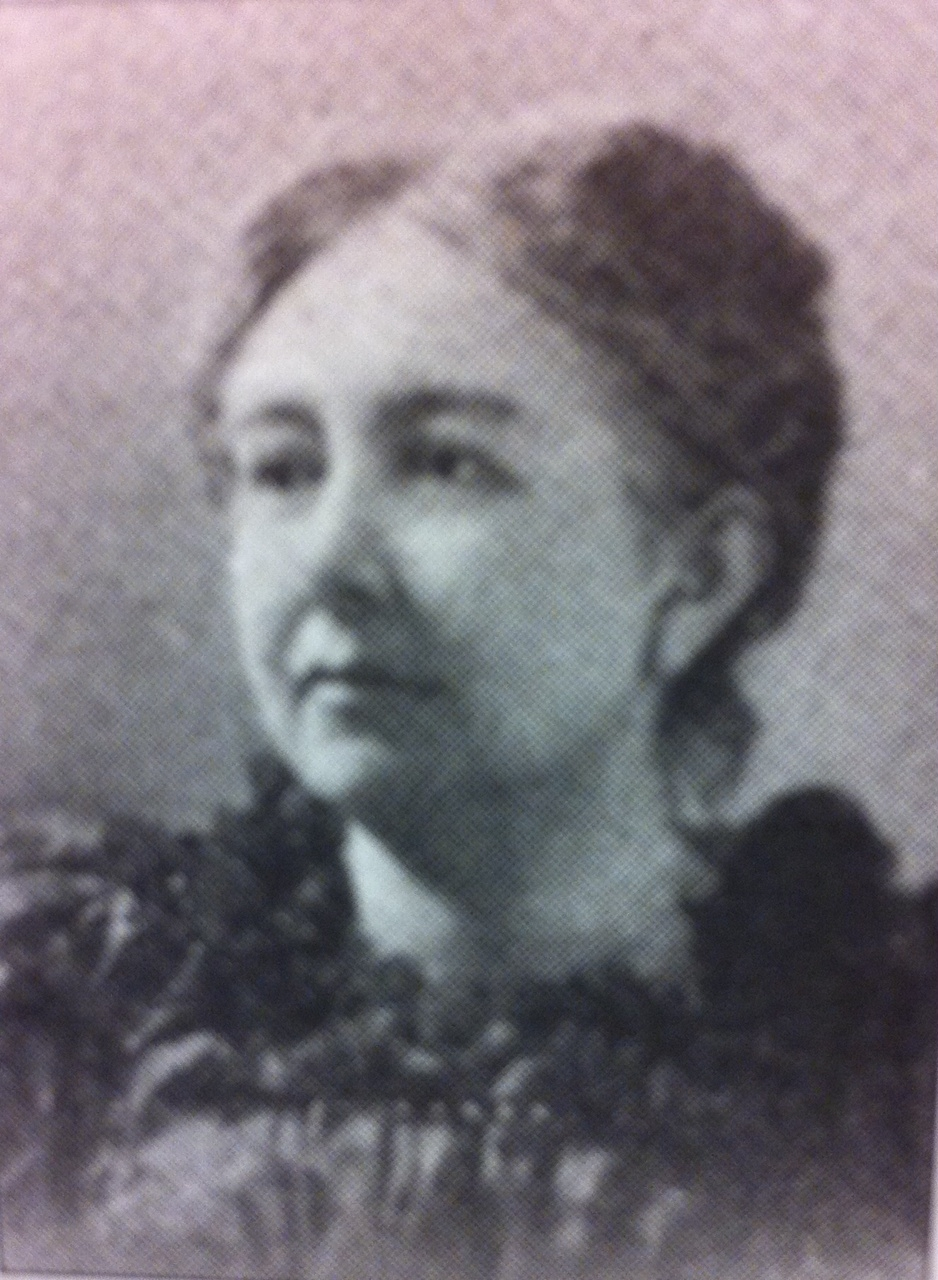
Edith Archibald

=== Cayman Islands ===
- Georgette Ebanks (1927–2023) – suffragist who petitioned demanding women's suffrage in the Cayman Islands
- Mary Evelyn Wood (1900–1978) – nurse and suffragist who petitioned demanding women's suffrage in the Cayman Islands; became the first woman elected to the Legislative Assembly of the Cayman Islands

=== Costa Rica ===
- Ana Rosa Chacón (1889–1985) – suffragist and co-founder of Liga Feminista Costarricense (LFC)
- Lidia Fernández – suffragist and co-founder of Liga Feminista Costarricense (LFC)
- Esther de Mézerville (1885–1971) – Guatemalan-born suffragist who helped women get the vote in Costa Rica

=== Cuba ===
- Berta Arocena de Martínez Márquez (1899–1956) – journalist, suffragist and feminist
- María Collado Romero (1885– c. 1968) – journalist, vice-president of the National Suffragist Party, then founder and president of the Democratic Suffragist Party of Cuba
- Hortensia Lamar (1888–1967) – suffragist and president of the Club Femenino de Cuba and the Federación Nacional de Asociaciones Femeninas
- Aída Peláez de Villa Urrutia (1895–1923) – writer, journalist and suffragist who published "Necesidad del voto para la mujer" (Necessity of the vote for women) in El Sufragista magazine
- Pilar Jorge de Tella (1884–1967) – suffragist who presented petitions to the Cuban legislature and constitutional conventions demanding suffrage

=== Dominican Republic ===
- Minerva Bernardino (1907–1998) – Dominican suffragist and diplomat who campaigned internationally to improve women's suffrage in Latin American states and who was involved in creating and later chairing the United Nations Commission on the Status of Women (CSW)
- Isabel Mayer (1885–1961) – suffragist, politician and socialite who was a member of Acción Feminista Dominicana (AFD)
- Abigail Mejia (1895 –1941) – suffragist, educator and founder of Acción Feminista Dominicana (AFD)

=== El Salvador ===
- Prudencia Ayala (1885–1936) – writer and suffragist who attempted to run as a candidate for the presidency of the Republic, even though the Salvadoran legislation did not recognize women's right to vote
- María Álvarez de Guillén (1889–1980) – novelist and inaugural member of the Inter-American Commission of Women
- Rosa Amelia Guzmán (1922–2011) – journalist, suffragist, and co-founder of the Liga Femenina Salvadoreña (LFS) (Salvadoran Feminist League) whose 1950 speech to the Constituent Assembly was instrumental in women gaining the vote; later one of the first 3 women to gain a seat in the Legislative Assembly of El Salvador

=== Haiti ===
- Marie-Thérèse Colimon-Hall (1918–1997) – writer and member of the Ligue Féminine d'Action Sociale (Women's Social Action League)
- Alice Garoute (1874–1950) – co-founder of the Ligue Féminine d'Action Sociale
- Madeleine Sylvain-Bouchereau (1905–1970) – sociologist and co-founder of the Ligue Féminine d'Action Sociale
- Yvonne Sylvain (1907–1989) – first female doctor from Haiti, advocate for gender equality, and co-founder of the Ligue Féminine d'Action Sociale

=== Honduras ===
- Graciela Bográn (1896–2000) – educator, writer, trade unionist and women's rights activist
- María Trinidad del Cid (1899–1966) – journalist, feminist and suffragist considered a foundational figure in the fight for women's rights in Honduras
- Lucila Gamero de Medina (1873–1964) – novelist and suffragist
- Paca Navas (1883–1971) – journalist, feminist and suffragist, exiled for her political views
- Alba Alonso de Quesada (1924–2020) – lawyer, academic and politician who submitted petitions to the legislature which granted partial suffrage and granted votes to women who could read and write

=== Mexico ===
- Fidelia Brindis Camacho (1889–1972)– teacher, journalist, suffragist, women's rights activist and politician
- Amalia González Caballero de Castillo Ledón (1898–1986) – politician, founder of Club Internacional de Mujeres, and founder of the Ateneo Mexicano de Mujeres
- Esther Chapa (1904–1970) – medical surgeon, suffragist and member of the Single Front Pro-Women's Rights group (FUPDM)
- Emma Catalina Encinas Aguayo (1909–1990) – suffragist, translator and the first Mexican woman to attain a pilot's license
- Hermila Galindo (1896–1954) – feminist and secretary to President Venustiano Carranza, she influenced his views on women's rights
- Margarita Robles de Mendoza (1896–1954) – suffragist, journalist and founder of the Unión de Mujeres Americanas (UMA) (Union of American Women)
- Elena Sánchez Valenzuela (1900–1950) – silent film actress, archivist and suffragist
- Paulina Ana María Zapata Portillo (1915–2010) – politician and member of the UMA

=== Newfoundland ===
- Margaret Davidson (1871–1964) – member of Women's Patriotic Association, named Dame Commander of the Order of the British Empire for her work with the Red Cross Society and the Scouting and Girl Guides in New South Wales
- Margaret Iris Duley (1894–1968) – considered Newfoundland's first novelist, member of Women's Patriotic Association
- Julia Salter Earle (1878–1945) – suffragist, trade unionist, one of the first three women to run for St. John's Municipal Council
- Armine Nutting Gosling (1861–1942) – member of Women's Patriotic Association, suffragette, founder and first Secretary of the Ladies Reading Room and Current Events Club, first female member of the Council of Higher Education in Newfoundland
- Fannie Knowling McNeil (1869–1928) – suffragist, social activist, member of the Newfoundland Women's Franchise League, and co-founder of the Newfoundland Society of Art, one of the first three women to run for St. John's Municipal Council
- Janet Morison Miller (1891–1946) – first woman added to the rolls of the Newfoundland Law Society
- Mary Southcott (1862–1943) – nurse, hospital administrator and campaigner
- Helena Squires (1879–1959) – social activist, first woman to win a seat in the Newfoundland House of Assembly

=== Nicaragua ===
- Josefa Toledo de Aguerri, also called Josefa Emilia Toledo Murillo (1866–1962) – Nicaraguan feminist, writer and reform pedagogue
- Juanita Molina de Fromen (1893–1934) – teacher and suffragist

=== Panama ===
- Elida Campodónico (1894–1960) – teacher, women's rights advocate, attorney, first woman ambassador in Latin America
- Tomasa Ester Casís (1878 – 1962) – teacher and suffragist
- Clara González (1898–1990) – feminist, lawyer, judge, and activist
- Gumercinda Páez (1904–1991) – teacher, women's rights activist and suffragette, and Constituent Assemblywoman of Panama

=== Puerto Rico ===
- Isabel Andreu de Aguilar (1887–1948) – educator, helped establish the Puerto Rican Feminist League, was president of Puerto Rican Association of Women Suffragists, and first woman to run for Senate in PR
- Rosario Bellber González (1881–1948) - educator, social worker, women's rights activist, suffragist, and philanthropist; president of the Social League of Suffragists of Puerto Rico (Spanish: La Liga Social Sufragista (LSS) de Puerto Rico)
- Milagros Benet de Mewton (1868–1948) – teacher who filed a lawsuit to press for suffrage
- Carlota Matienzo (1881–1926) – teacher, one of the founders of the Puerto Rican Feminine League and the Suffragist Social League
- Felisa Rincón de Gautier (1897–1994) – mayor of San Juan, first woman to hold post of mayor of a capital city in the Americas

=== Trinidad ===
- Beatrice Greig (born 1869) – suffragist, writer and advocate

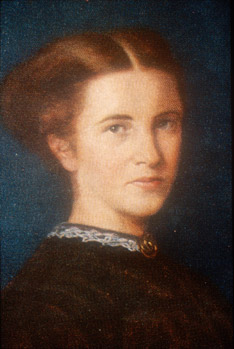
Elizabeth Garrett Anderson

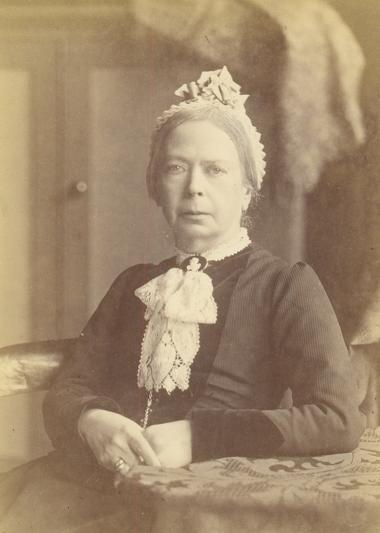
Frances Buss

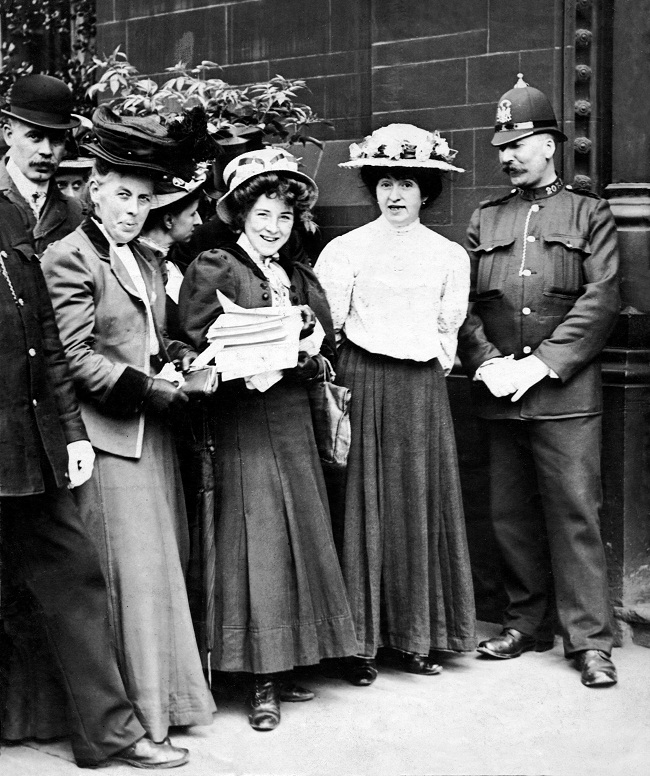
Mabel Capper (3rd from right, with petition) and fellow suffragettes, 1910

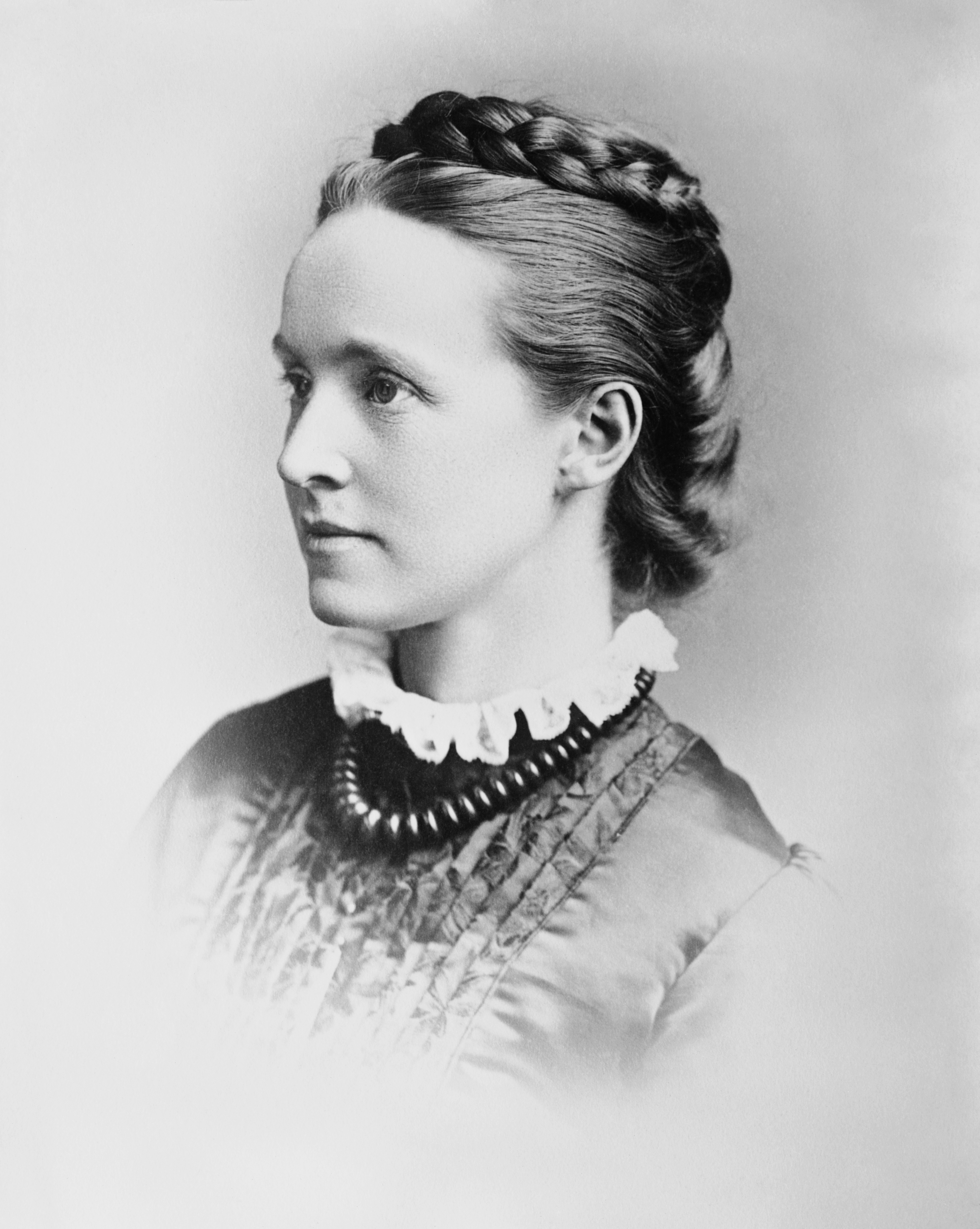
Millicent Fawcett

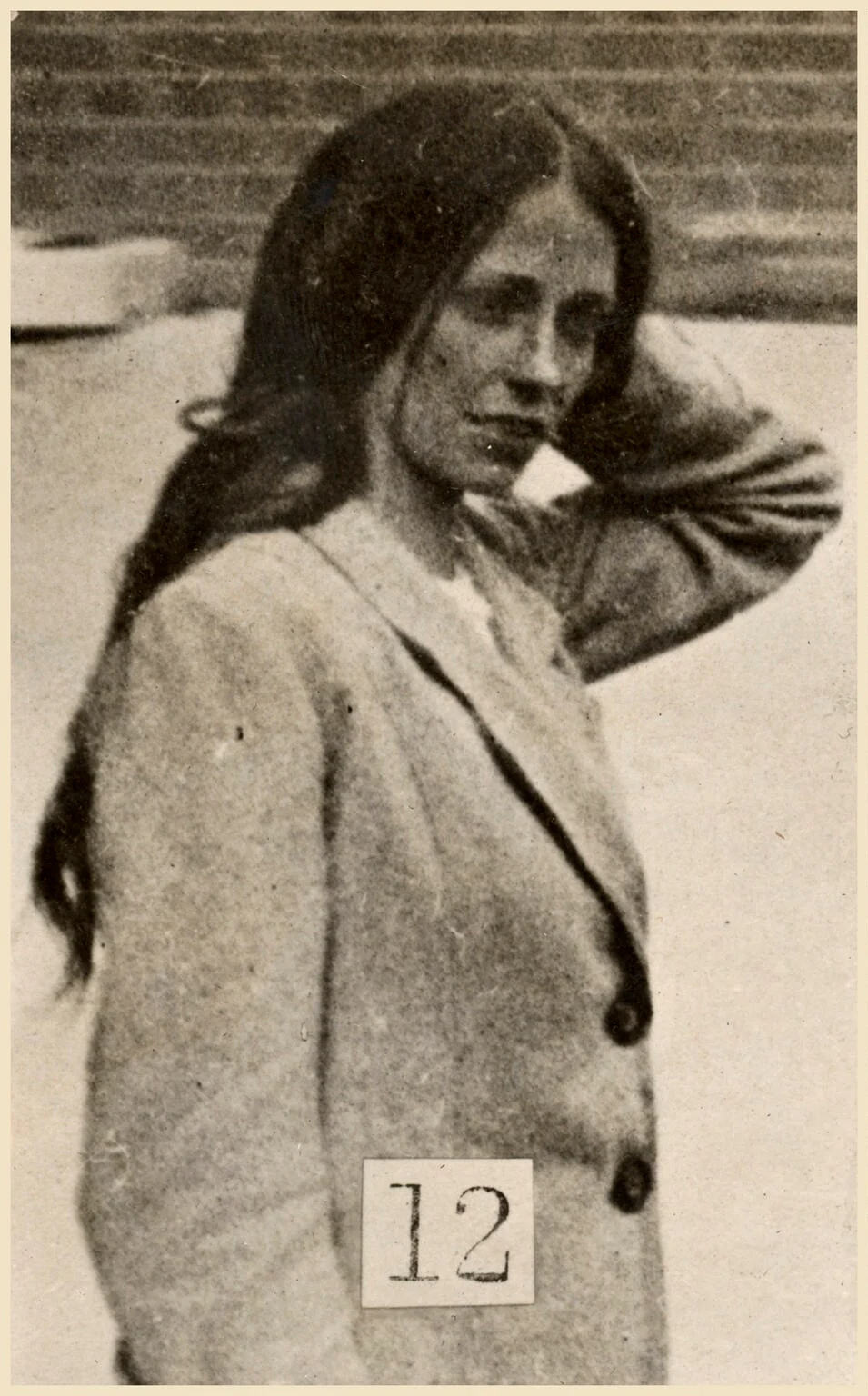
Lilian Lenton

Kathleen Lyttelton

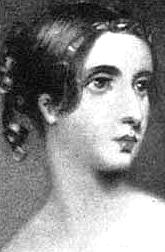
Harriet Taylor Mill

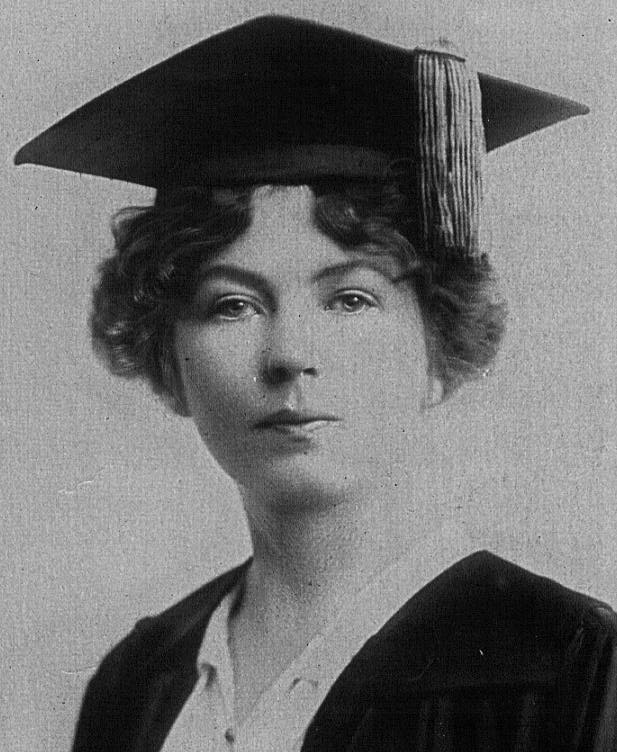
Christabel Pankhurst

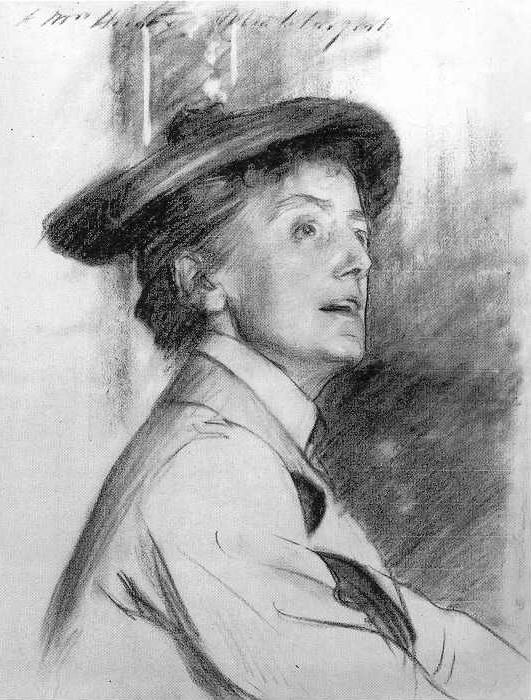
Ethel Smyth

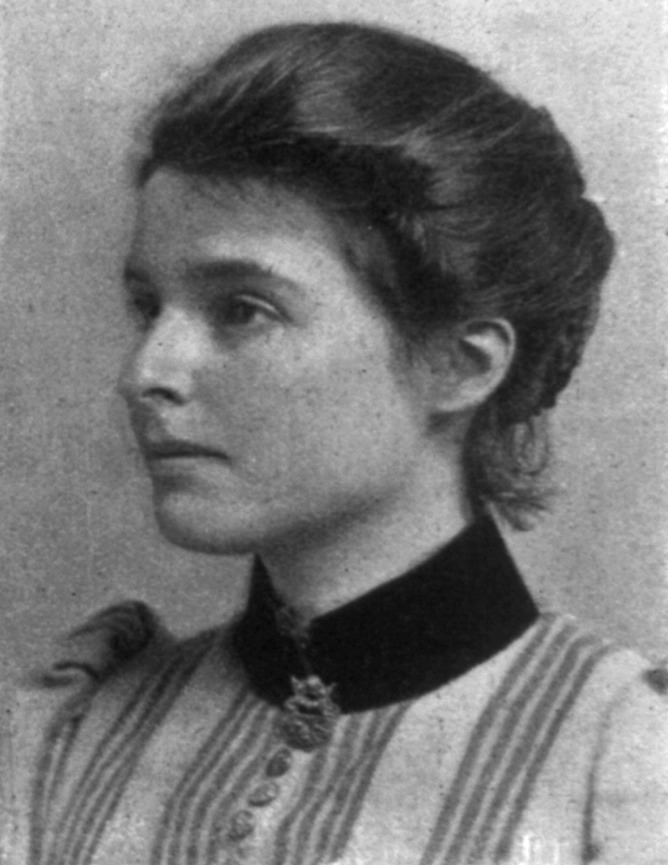
Beatrice Webb

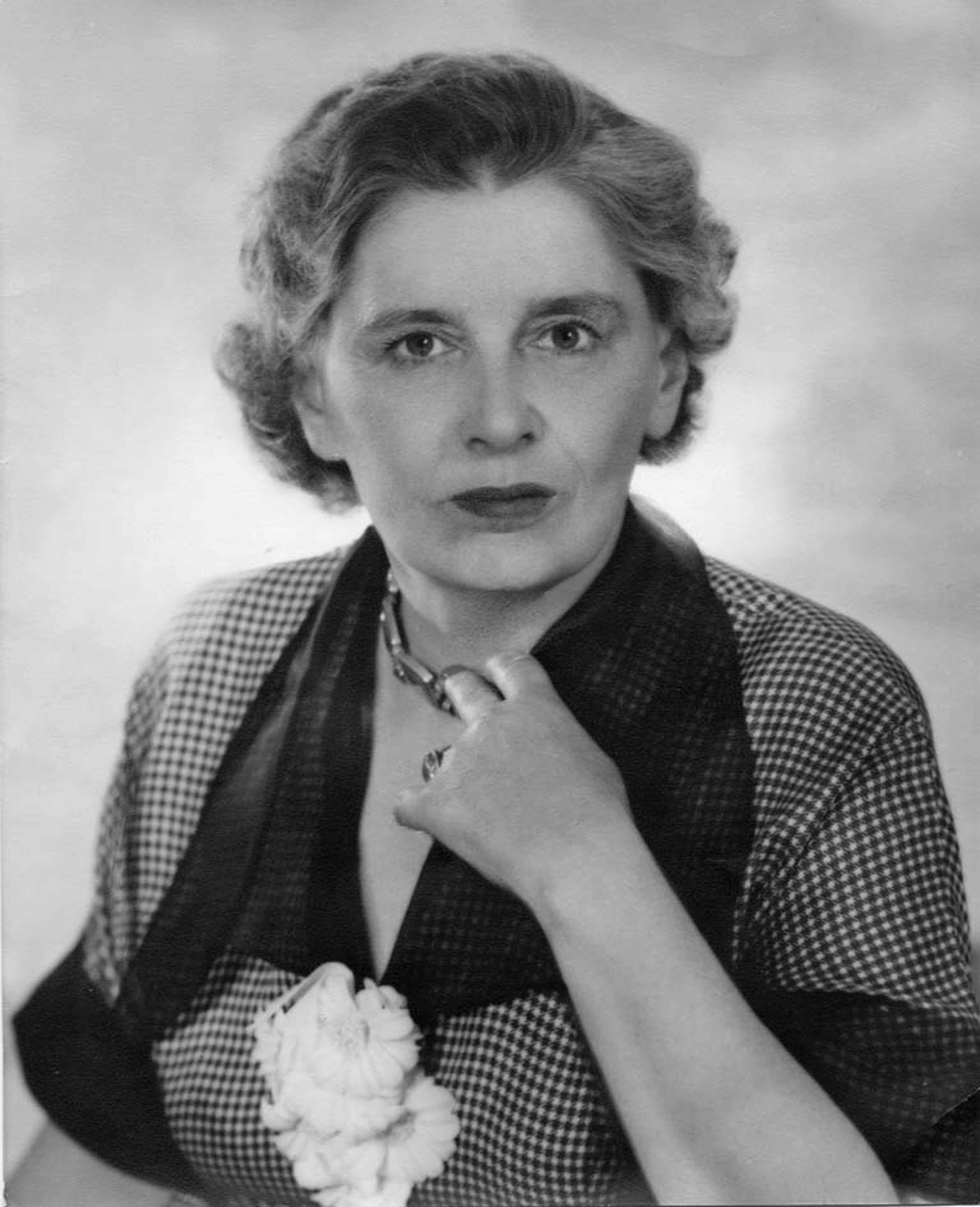
Rebecca West

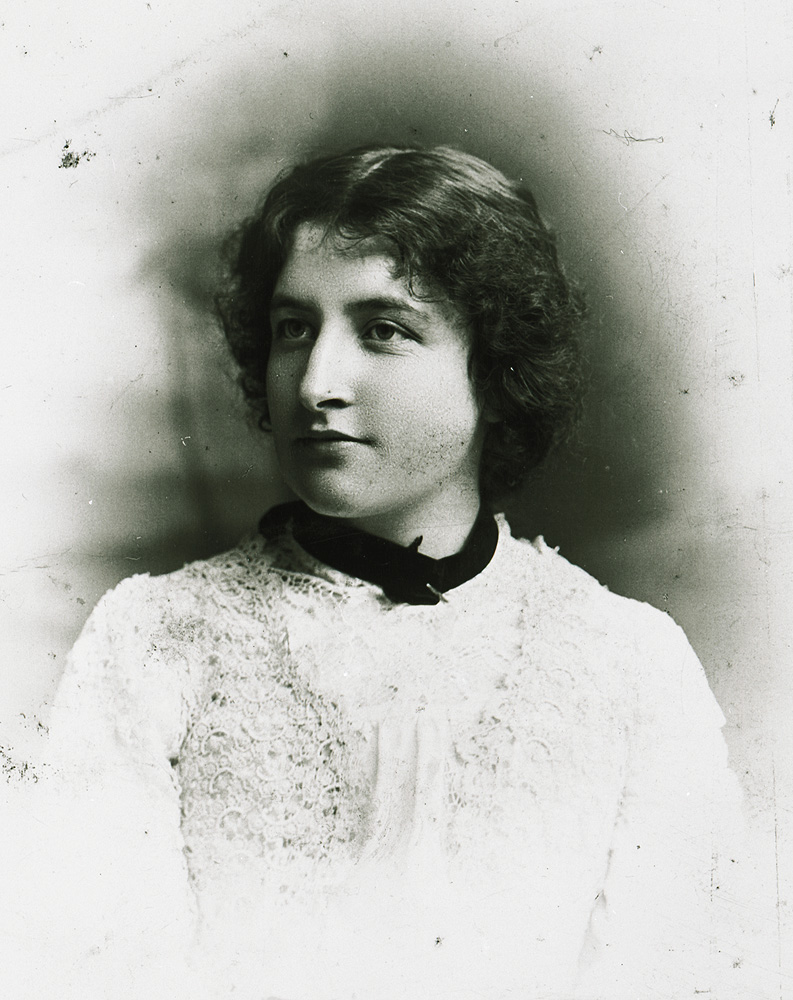
Margaret McPhun

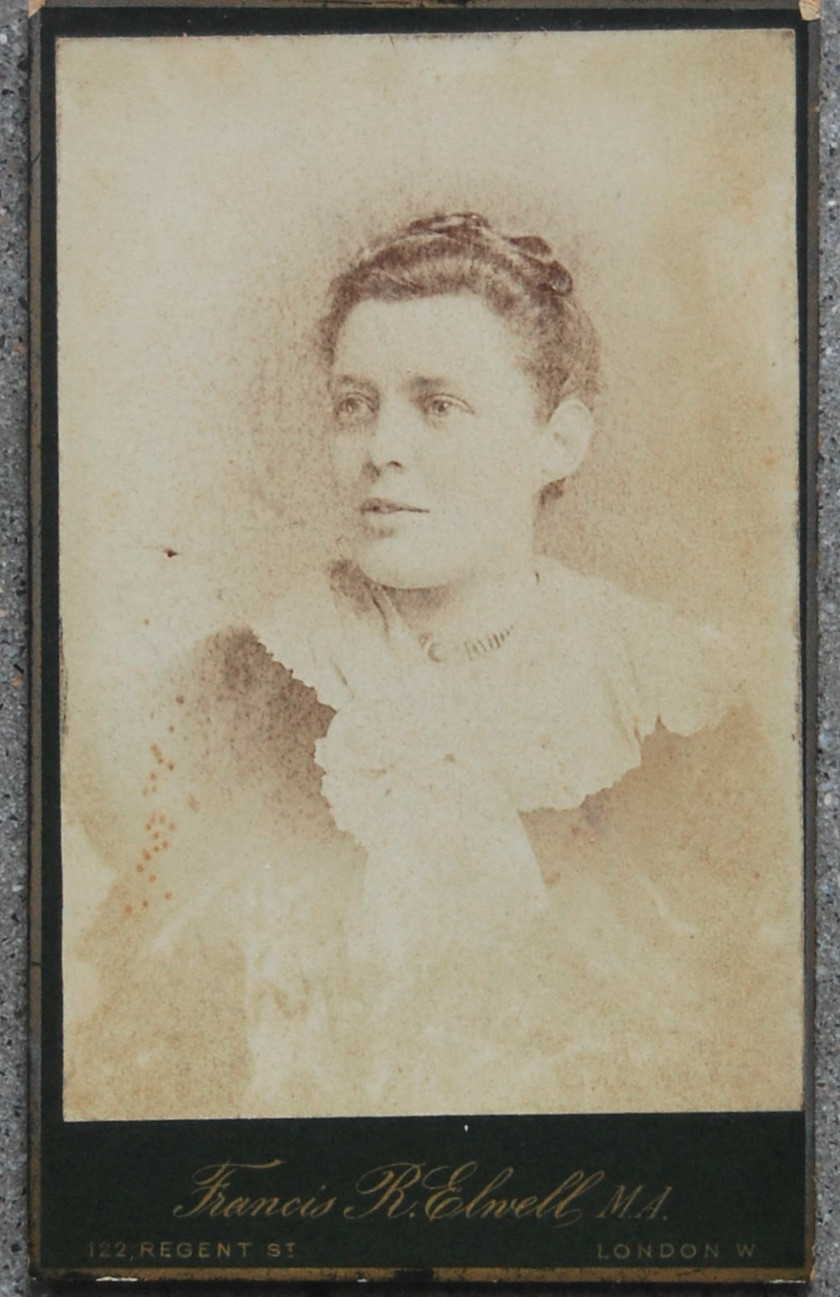
Dr Elizabeth Pace

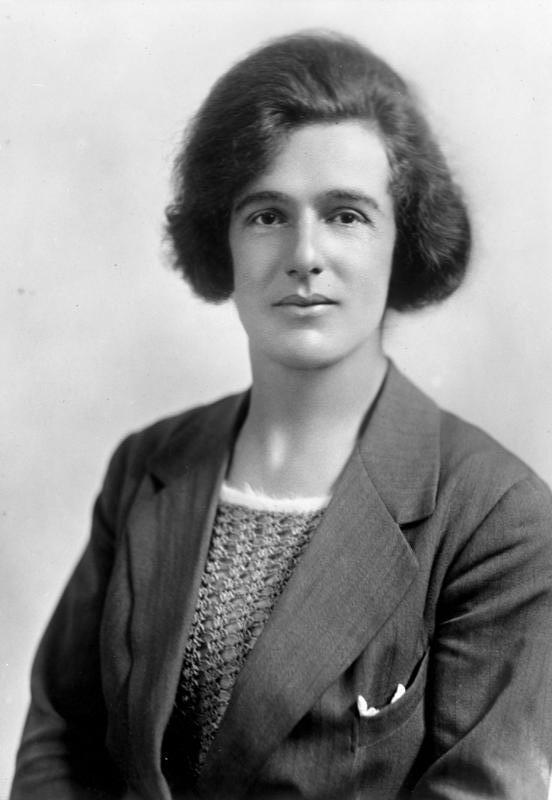
Bundesarchiv Bild 102–09812, Jessie Stephen no-text

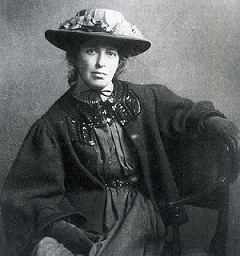
Jessie Newbery

Ethel Cox under arrest, 1914

=== United States ===
==== United States Virgin Islands ====
- Bertha C. Boschulte (1906–2004) – Secretary of the St. Thomas Teacher's Association, which sued for women's suffrage in the territory in 1935
- Edith L. Williams (1887–1987) – first woman to attempt to register to vote in the US Virgin Islands

== South America ==
=== Argentina ===
- Cecilia Grierson (1859–1934) – the first woman physician in Argentina; supporter of women's emancipation, including suffrage
- Julieta Lanteri (1873–1932) – physician, freethinker, and activist; the first woman to vote in Argentina
- Alicia Moreau de Justo (1885–1986) – physician, politician, pacifist and human rights activist
- Eva Perón (1919–1952) – First Lady of Argentina, created the first large female political party in the nation
- Elvira Rawson de Dellepiane (1867–1954) – physician, activist for women's and children's rights; co-founder of the Association Pro-Derechos de la Mujer

=== Belize ===
- Gwendolyn Lizarraga (1901–1975) – politician who, when only landowners were eligible as voters, supported women to obtain land grants from the Lands Department
- Elfreda Reyes (1901–1992) – labor organizer, suffragette and member of the Women’s League

=== Brazil ===
- Leolinda de Figueiredo Daltro (1859–1935) – teacher and indigenous' rights activist; co-founder of the Feminine Republican Party
- Celina Guimarães Viana (1890–1972) – Brazilian professor and suffragist; first woman to vote in Brazil
- Ivone Guimarães (1908–1999) – Brazilian professor and activist for women's suffrage
- Jerônima Mesquita (1880–1972) – co-founder of the Federação Brasileira pelo Progresso Feminino
- Carlota Pereira de Queirós (1892–1982) – the first woman to vote and be elected to the Brazilian parliament
- Marie Rennotte (1852–1942) – Native Belgian, naturalized Brazilian teacher and lawyer who founded the Aliança Paulista pelo Sufrágio Feminino with Carrie Chapman Catt's help
- Miêtta Santiago (1903–1995) – Brazilian writer, poet, and lawyer; challenged the constitutionality of the ban on women voting in Brazil
- Nathercia da Cunha Silveira (1905–1993) – suffragist, lawyer and Assistant Attorney General of the National Labor Council
- Maria Werneck de Castro (1909–1993) – lawyer, militant communist, feminist, and supporter of women's suffrage
- Almerinda Farias Gama (1899–1999) – lawyer, trade unionist and suffragist

=== Chile ===
- Celinda Arregui (1864–1941) – feminist politician, writer, teacher, suffrage activist
- María de la Cruz (1912–1995) – political activist, journalist, writer, political commentator, first woman elected to the Chilean senate
- Carolina Huidobro (1859–1909) – teacher and the Chilian Delegate to the First International National American Woman Suffrage Association conference
- Henrietta Müller (1846–1906) – Chilean-British women's rights activist and theosophist
- Marta Vergara (1898–1995) – co-founder of MEMch; Inter-American Commission of Women delegate

=== Colombia ===
- Ofelia Uribe de Acosta (1900–1988) – suffragist who published the book Una voz insurgente (An Insurgent Voice)
- Esmeralda Arboleda Cadavid (1921–1997) – suffragist, politician and the first woman elected to the Senate of Colombia
- Lucila Rubio de Laverde (1908–1970) – co-founder of the suffrage organizations, Unión Femenina de Colombia (Women's Union of Colombia) (UFC) and the Alianza Femenina de Colombia (Women's Alliance of Colombia)
- María Currea Manrique (1890–1985) – co-founder of the suffrage organizations, Unión Femenina de Colombia (Women's Union of Colombia) (UFC) and the Alianza Femenina de Colombia (Women's Alliance of Colombia)

=== Ecuador ===
- Hipatia Cárdenas de Bustamante (1889–1972) – writer, suffragist and the first female presidential candidate in Ecuador
- Matilde Hidalgo (1889–1974) – physician, poet, and activist who was the first woman in Latin America to exercise her constitutional right to vote in a national election
- Zoila Ugarte de Landívar (1864–1969) – writer, journalist, librarian and suffragist
- María Piedad Castillo de Levi (1888–1962) – poet, journalist, suffragist and a participant in a demonstration on the streets of Guayaquil in 1924

=== Peru ===
- Aurora Cáceres (1877–1958) – writer and suffragist

=== Uruguay ===
- Paulina Luisi Janicki (1875–1949) – leader of the feminist movement in Uruguay, first Uruguayan woman to earn a medical degree in Uruguay (1909)

=== Venezuela ===
- Argelia Laya (1926–1997) – educator and suffragist
- Carmen Clemente Travieso (1900–1983) – journalist and women's rights activist

== See also ==
- List of women's suffrage publications
- List of women's suffrage organizations
- Anti-suffragists
- List of civil rights leaders
- List of democracy and elections-related topics
- List of feminists
- List of monuments and memorials to women's suffrage
- List of women's rights activists
- Open Christmas Letter
- Seneca Falls Convention
- Suffrage Hikes
- Timeline of first women's suffrage in majority-Muslim countries
- Timeline of women's rights (other than voting)
- Timeline of women's suffrage
- Timeline of women's suffrage in the United States
- Women's suffrage in Australia
- Women's suffrage in Japan
- Women's suffrage in New Zealand
- Women's suffrage in the United Kingdom
- Women's suffrage in Scotland
- Women's suffrage in the United States
