= May Kennedy Goodridge =

Canadian suffragist and activist

May Kennedy (1876-1974) was a suffragist and activist in the Dominion of Newfoundland.

== Life ==
May Kennedy was born into a prosperous family in St. John's, Newfoundland, and educated at a convent school in Waterford, Ireland. As the last remaining child in the family, May Kennedy inherited a substantial fortune. She became active in the Newfoundland suffrage movement as a single woman, independently wealthy, but not allowed to vote.

Kennedy was active in the St. John's-based Ladies Reading Room and the Women's Patriotic Association (WPA). During WWI, Kennedy worked at the Navy and Military Convalescent Hospital, Waterford Hall in St. John's, as a member of the Voluntary Aid Detachment (VAD), providing nursing care to recovering soldiers. Many of the suffrage leaders sat on the committee of control for this hospital.

May Kennedy joined the Newfoundland Women's Franchise League at its founding meeting in 1920 and became Honorary Treasurer. She travelled to important international franchise meetings - Baltimore, Washington and Paris in particular - representing Newfoundland women for enfranchisement. In 1925, when women in Newfoundland achieved the right to vote, Kennedy, along with labour activist Julia Salter Earle and suffragist Fannie Knowling McNeil, ran for seats on St. John's city council. All were defeated, but gained many votes and established women's right to political office.

She married Thomas Goodridge late in her life and had no children.
