= Ivone Guimarães =

Brazilian suffragette, teacher and activist (1908–1999)

- Born: 15 June 1908; Pitangui, Brazil
- Died: 9 March 1999 (aged 90)
- Occupation: Professor
- Known for: one of the first women to vote in Brazil
- Spouse: Engenheiro Alício Batista Lopes

Ivone Guimarães Batista Lopes (Pitangui, 15 June 1908 – 9 March 1999) was a Brazilian professor, suffragist and activist. She along with Celina Guimarães Viana and Miêtta Santiago were the first women to vote in Brazil.

== Biography ==
On 17 October 1928, she spoke up alongside Miêtta Santiago who challenged the constitutionality of the ban on women voting in Brazil, stating that it breached Article 70 of the country's Constitution, dated February 24, 1891, which was then in force. This action led Guimarães to become one of the pioneers in exercising the right to vote in her country.

Guimarães studied at the Colégio Nossa Senhora das Dores in São João Del Rey, where graduated in 1924. In the following year, she started her activities at the Francisca Botelho School Group. She also spent time studying Methodology at Escola Normal Monsenhor Artur de Oliveira and, in 1933, started studying Psychology at Escola Normal de Belo Horizonte. In 1946, she was nominated professor of Educational Sociology at the Education Institute of Minas Gerais. Furthermore, she was nominated as an effective member of the Examining Board of candidates for the 2nd Degree Official Ministry and, in the following year, she graduated in law at Universidade Federal de Minas Gerais (UFMG). In 1962, Ivone graduated as French interpreter and translator at ETIMIG. In 1969, she got first place in the Moral and Civic Education Contest at the Minas Gerais Institute of Education and retired as a professor of Educational Sociology of I.E.M.G. Finally, in 1980, she retired as a teacher at the State School Governardor Milton Campos.

Ivone was the daughter of Vital Pereira Guimarães and Amélia Lobato. She married Alício Batista Lopes, and engineer, and they had several children: Alício, Paulo de Tarso, Francis, Patrícia Catarina, Magnus and Ruimar.
