= Alma Dolens =

Italian pacifist, journalist, and feminist

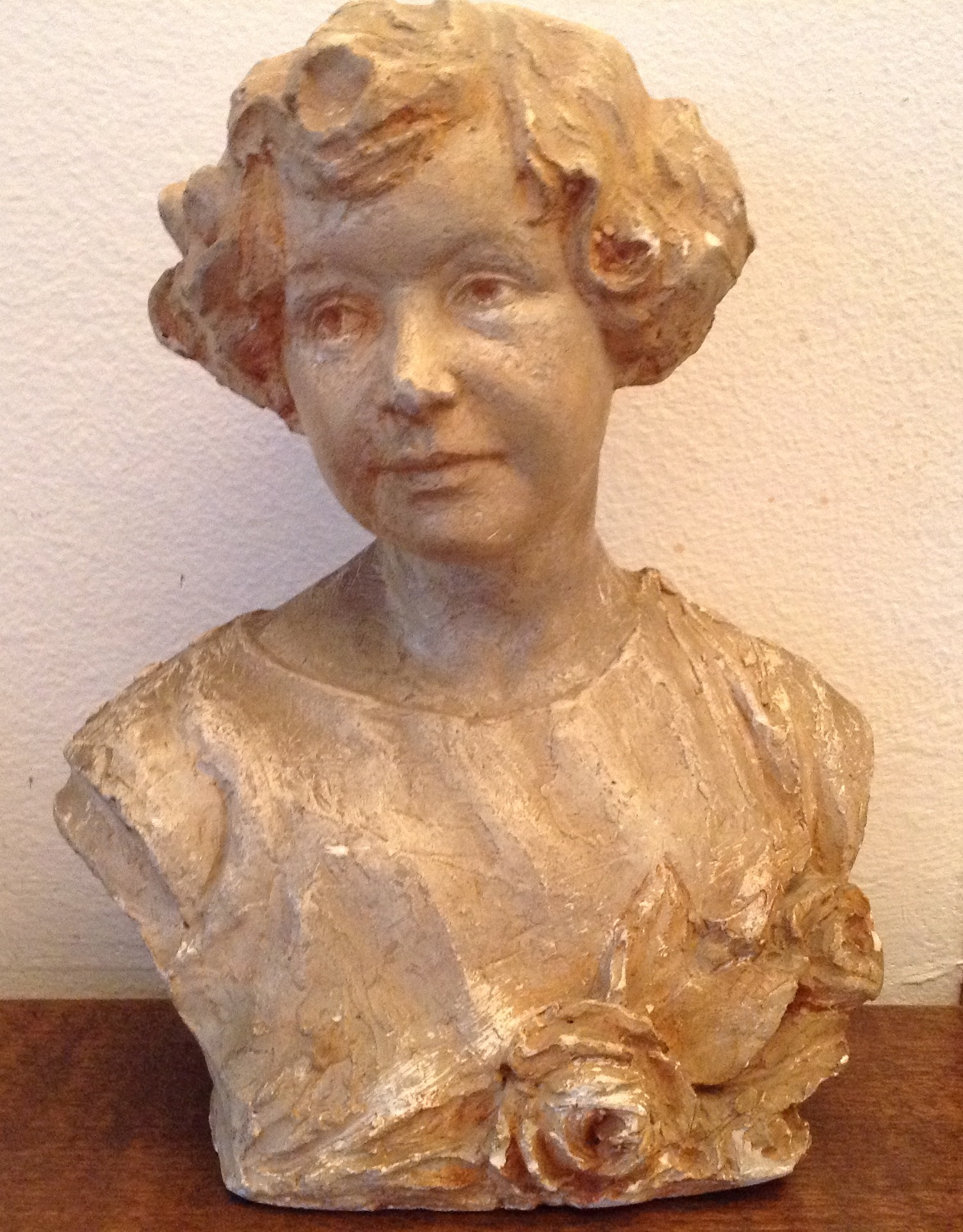
- Teresita Pasini alias Alma Dolens
- Born: Teresita dei Bonfatti; 18 February 1869
- Died: 20 May 1948 (aged 79); Milan
- Other name: Teresita Pasini

Teresita Pasini (née dei Bonfatti, 1869 – 1948), better known by her pseudonym Alma Dolens, was a prominent Italian pacifist, suffragist, and journalist. "Alma Dolens" is a combination of the Latin alma meaning "soul" or "heart" with the Latin participle dolens meaning "pained" or "grieving"; the name can thus be translated as "sorrowful heart" or "heavy heart", and is thought to refer to her feelings surrounding militarism and war.

== Personal life ==
Alma Dolens was born into a wealthy Umbrian family in 1876. Her family was well known within the Italian unification movement, where they supported Giuseppe Garibaldi. Alma Dolens married a lawyer from Milan, who was supportive of her work.

== Work ==
Alma Dolens served as the president of the Lombardy Committee for Woman Suffrage and Workers' Rights. She spoke at national peace conferences in 1909 and 1910, cementing her role within the otherwise male-dominated Italian peace movement. She believed that women were necessary for social progress, and that the lack of women within the Italian peace movement and within politics as a whole was detrimental. Dolens was also a strong proponent of creating bonds between the Italian peace movement and the trade unions. She created the Società per la pace femminile (Women's Society for Peace), and traveled throughout central Italy to create local committees within it. She worked with the metalworkers' union to create the Associazione nazionale pro arbitrate e disarmo (Workers' Society for Arbitration and Disarmament) in Milan, which had around 700 members by the early 1910s.

The 191 Italo-Turkish War ended the peace movement, creating a divide between those who felt that they should support the war and those who did not. Dolens fell in the latter category, campaigning publicly against the war and appealing to groups within the United States and Switzerland for financial support to allow the pacifists to reform. She continued to work throughout 1911 and 1912, but the Italian pacifist movement eventually fell apart completely, and Dolens was banned from speaking publicly in Italy for those two years. She turned her attentions elsewhere, writing about living conditions for the lower class in Italian cities. At a peace conference in Budapest in 1913, Dolens met and befriended Rosika Schwimmer, another pacifist and suffragist. She also returned to speaking at party events in 1913, sometimes alongside Margherita Sarfatti.

In 1914, Dolens went to meetings about the impending war in Europe that had been organized by the International Peace Bureau and by The Hague. She and Rosalia Gwiss-Adami were the Italian pacifists' delegates to the 31 July conference in Brussels, a conference that served as one last attempt at avoiding the war. Throughout the war, she performed relief work for families who had been driven out of their homes by the war within Austria-Hungary. After the end of the Italo-Turkish War, she traveled through Belgium to lecture. Seeing the destruction from the war reaffirmed her beliefs in pacifism, and she said in one of her lectures "the enemy is not at the border; it is all around us: it is poverty, tuberculosis, unemployment. The cure for these diseases is the end of formidable and costly weaponry." She insisted the countries should be required by law to arbitrate during war.

After the Second World War, Dolens went to live in the home of a socialist friend, Gilberto Gilioli and his wife Myrthe Ripamonti, where she died in 1948.

== See also ==
- List of peace activists
- List of suffragists and suffragettes
