= Women of Malta Association =

The Women of Malta Association or Women of Malta – Nisa ta’ Malta, was a women's organization in Malta, founded in January 1944. It played an important role for the women's movement in Malta, and successfully worked for the introduction of women's suffrage.

== Background ==
Malta was a British colony, but when women's suffrage was finally introduced in Great Britain in 1918, this had not been included in the 1921 Constitution on Malta, when Malta was given its own parliament, although the Labour Party did support the reform. In 1931, Mabel Strickland, assistant secretary of Constitution Party, delivered a petition signed by 428 women to the Royal Commission on Maltese Affairs requesting women's suffrage without success. However, there had been no organized movement for women's suffrage on Malta.

== Foundation and campaign ==
In 1944 the Women of Malta Association was founded by Josephine Burns de Bono and Helen Buhagiar, with Burns de Bono as its President and Buhagiar as General Secretary. It was founded under the guidance of Reggie Miller of the Labour Front but its members consisted mainly of upper class elite women. The purpose was to work for the inclusion of women's suffrage in the new Malta constitution, which was to be introduced in 1947 and which was at that time prepared in parliament. The Women of Malta Association was officially registered as a labor union, in order to give its representatives the right to speak in parliament. Their presence were nonetheless questioned, though without success.

The Catholic church, voiced by archbishop Michael Gonzi, as well as the Nationalist Party opposed women's suffrage with the argument that suffrage would be an unnecessary burden for women who had family and household to occupy them. The Labour Party as well as the labour movement in general supported the reform. An argument was that women paid taxes and should therefore also vote to decide what to do with them. Women's suffrage was approved with the votes 145 to 137. However, this did not included women's right to be elected to political office, and the Women of Malta Association therefore continued the campaign to include also this right. The debate continued with the same supporters and opponents, and the same arguments for and against, until this right was approved as well. After the approval of the reform in parliament, Josephine Burns de Bono resigned from her post as President of the Women of Malta Association with the statement that the purpose of the organization had now been achieved.

== Result and aftermath ==
Women's suffrage and the right to be elected to political office were included in the MacMichael Constitution, which was finally introduced on 5 September 1947. A politician at the time commented that the reform had been possible only because of women's participation in the war effort during the World War II. William E. Chetcuti of The Bulletin commented that it:

“would seem that by a bare majority of only 10 votes, in the absence of about 160 members and with the aid of the open vote, our small band of budding women politicians have, with the gallant half of several vote hunters, contrived to achieve what they call their emancipation”.

Constitutional Commissioner Sir Harold MacMichael noted:

“The most important [change] was the inclusion of the principle of female suffrage on a basis of equality between the sexes in all respects.”

In the following elections in the summer of 1947, two women participated as candidates for MP, Hélène Buhagiar for the Democratic Action Party and Agatha Barbara of the Labour Party, of whom the latter won and became the first woman MP in Malta, later be coming also the first female cabinet minister and the first female President of Malta.
