= Helen Buhagiar =

Maltese political activist and feminist (1888–1975)

Helen Buhagiar (1888–1975) was a Maltese political activist and feminist.

== Biography ==
Buhagiar came from a wealthy family. she was the daughter of Nicola Buhagiar, manager of the Malta Railway. She was known within the Maltese art world, being honorary secretary and treasurer and in 1916 chairman of the Malta Art Association.

Buhagiar was a co-founder of the Women of Malta Association, and served as the general secretary of the organization from the foundation in 1944, until women's suffrage was introduced in 1947. She played an important part in the activism for the introduction of women's suffrage in Malta. She stated that "since women pay taxes like men, they should also enjoy the same voting rights."

Women's suffrage and the right to be elected to political office were included in the MacMichael Constitution, which was finally introduced on 5 September 1947. In the following elections in the summer of 1947, two women participated as candidates for MP: Buhagiar for the Democratic Action Party and Agatha Barbara of the Labour Party, of whom the latter won and became the first woman MP in Malta.
