= Miêtta Santiago =

Brazilian writer, poet, lawyer, suffragist and feminist activist

Maria Ernestina Carneiro Santiago de Souza (pseudonym, Miêtta Santiago; Varginha, 1903–1995) was a Brazilian writer, poet, lawyer, suffragist and feminist activist in support of women's rights. She was one of the early women in Brazil to fully exercise their political rights.

== Biography ==
With Celina Guimarães Viana, Santiago was a pioneer in 1927 in the struggle for women's suffrage in Brazil. In 1928, Santiago challenged the constitutionality of the ban on women voting in Brazil, stating that it breached Article 70 of the Constitution of the Federal Republic of the United States of Brazil, dated February 24, 1891, which was then in force.

== Selected works ==
- Namorada da Deus (1936)
- Maria Ausência (1940)
- Uma consciência unitária para a humanidade (1981)
- As 7 poesias (1981)
