= Pirpirituba =

Coordinates: 6°46′S 35°30′W

- Municipality
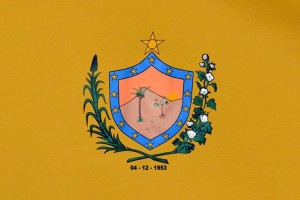
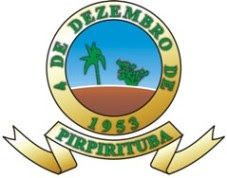
- Flag Coat of arms
- Interactive map of Pirpirituba
- Country: Brazil
- Region: Northeast
- State: Paraíba
- Mesoregion: Agreste Paraibano

Population (2020)
  - Total: 10,584
- Time zone: UTC−3 (BRT)

Pirpirituba (Central northeastern portuguese pronunciation: [piɦpiɾiˈtubɐ]) is a municipality in the state of Paraíba in the Northeast Region of Brazil.

== See also ==
- List of municipalities in Paraíba
