= Elfreda Reyes =

- Born: Elfreda Stanford; 1901; British Honduras
- Died: 1992 (aged 90–91); Belize
- Other names: Elfreda Trapp
- Occupation: activist
- Years active: 1919–81

Elfreda Reyes (1901 – 1992) was a labor organizer, suffragette, women's rights activist and political activist during the British Honduran struggle for independence from Great Britain. She helped found the Jobless Workers Union and pushed for labor reforms, including wage and hour laws, as well as the Women’s League, which fought for social, economic and political empowerment of women.

== Biography ==
Elfreda Stanford was born in 1901 in British Honduras to Creole Bajan immigrant, George Stanford and his wife Louisa. At the age of 10, she was selected for the 1910 “Tenth” ceremonies, to give the loyalty address of the schoolchildren to the governor. By 1919 she was working as a domestic for one of the white British families as an unskilled laborer. In the 1920s, Stanford married Solomon Trapp. Between 1924 and 1925, Trapp became a "significant new political voice" on gender and class. She was what is known in Belize as a Bembe woman. The term refers to primarily working-class women, who are "not afraid to fight or curse…", but who refuse to be defined by moralists because they see themselves as engaged in a justifiable fight for their rights or nationhood. She spoke at the 1932 constitutional hearings, where she demanded that the authorities protect the interests of working women, but did not press for universal suffrage on the basis of lack of education. Around the same time, she was one of the founders of the Jobless Workers factory. On 15 November 1933, the Independent carried a notice of Solomon Trapp's death. On 1 October 1934, she was one of the women who led the takeover of the largest private employer in British Honduras, BEC Sawmill. Initially the group was led by Tony Soberanis, but when the men backed away, black women had led labor dispute and warded off white men by wielding sticks, while commenting on the cowardice of their own male leaders.

By 1935, Trapp and her sisters Virginia and Ianthe Stanford were members of the Labourers and Unemployed Association (LUA). Her stance had been radicalized and Trapp was now in favor of full suffrage. When the LUA marked its first anniversary in March 1935 with new elections, the winners were Rosannah Branche, Sarah Johnson, Amybell Pratt (chair), Pearl Tennyson, Christobel Usher, and Trapp. LUA women organized the Women’s League in 1935 with the goals of creating a national democracy without hierarchies of class, sex, or race. The petition which they sent to the government asking for suffrage included blacks, Garifuna, mestizos and Mayans, the 98% of the populace which did not earn $25.00 per month, and all persons aged 21 and over. Around this same time, the Black Cross Nurses split with the LUA women over class lines, as the nurses were not in favor of enfranchising "the rowdy popular classes".

In 1940, during the dry season, a group of women were appointed from the Mesopotamia neighborhood of Belize City to ask the Colonial Secretary for the city water pipes to remain open longer than the customary one hour. Getting no positive response, a public meeting was held in which Trapp was the only woman speaker and she advocated hiring women to collect water tokens to better organize the waiting queues. Ultimately, her suggestion was rejected and the government barged in more water. During the 1940s, Trapp remarried, becoming Reyes. In the 1950s, when the People's United Party (PUP) began pushing for independence from Britain, poor women flocked to the party because the young nationalist leaders agreed to accept them as allies and no other parties would. Reyes was very active politically. In 1951, when the governor dissolved the predominantly PUP city council to thwart nationalist aims, Reyes led a protest to the Government House. During the general strike which occurred from October to December 1952, Reyes distributed supplies to strikers who had shut down work at the BEC sawmill, the Fort George Hotel, Public Works Department, the waterfront and extended to the road crews from Belize City to the Cayo District. At the end of the strike, Reyes led a meeting in which the domestic working women demanded, and ultimately won support for written contracts, a minimum wage and a 48-hour cap on hours worked per week. In early 1953, Reyes and her sister Virginia Stanford led a labor strike of domestic workers in which she led 400 workers demanding better pay. That same year, she was elected to the GWU’s General and Executive Council. The ten-person council elected four women: Reyes, Hazel Gentle, Enid Panting, and Elsa Vasquez.

In 1956, a split in the party occurred with accusations of slander leveled at Nicholas Pollard. Reyes was among those who signed the declaration accusing Pollard and submitting her PUP resignation, which she later claimed was because she felt George Cadle Price's leadership of the PUP was becoming more conservative and elitist. She joined the British Honduras Federation of Women (BHFW), who were primarily middle-class reformers and typically were seen as aligned with non-nationalist ideals and its voice and action plans were typically implemented in the elitist, colonial model. In 1956, Reyes was organizing training policies for BHFW for domestics wishing to obtain employment in Canada. By 1958, Reyes was serving as treasurer of the organization. By 1962, Reyes had joined the National Independence Party (NIP) and was appointed to serve on Labour Department’s new Domestic Servants Committee. In the late 1960s Reyes was working to keep day-care centers for poor working women open. She remained active in politics through the gaining of Belize independence in 1981.

Reyes died in 1992 in Belize City, Belize.

== Sources ==
- Macpherson, Anne S. (2007). From Colony to Nation: Women Activists and the Gendering of Politics in Belize, 1912-1982 (PDF). University of Nebraska Press. ISBN 978-0-8032-0626-7.
- Shepherd, Verene (1999). Women in Caribbean History: The British-Colonised Territories. Randle. ISBN 978-976-8123-64-0.
