= Sheroo Keeka =

Politician in Tanganyika

Nominated Member of the Legislative Council
- In office 1955–1958
- Constituency: Central Province

Personal details
- Born: 11 September 1921 India
- Died: 14 September 2006 (aged 84) United Kingdom

Sheroo Dara Keeka (11 September 1921 – 14 September 2006) was an India-born politician in Tanganyika. In 1955 she was one of the first three women appointed to the Legislative Council.

== Biography ==
Born in India in 1921, Keeka attended St. Xavier's College in Bombay. She moved to Tanganyika, becoming headmistress of the Aga Khan Girls School in Dodoma in 1940, a role she held until 1944. In 1953 she became chair of the Dodoma branch of the Tanganyika Society for Prevention of Cruelty to Animals. Her husband Dara Framroze Keeka, also an alumnus of St. Xavier's College, was a prominent lawyer and chairman of Dodoma Town Council.

In 1955 she was appointed to the Legislative Council representing Central Province as one of the first three female members, serving until 1958. She subsequently campaigned for 'Votes for Married Women', and served as chair of Dodoma branch of the Tanganyika Council of Women from 1958 to 1962. She was also a Girl Guides commissioner from 1960 and a committee member of the Dodoma branch of the Tanganyika Red Cross.

She died in the United Kingdom in 2006.
