= Julia Salter Earle =

Social activist in Newfoundland

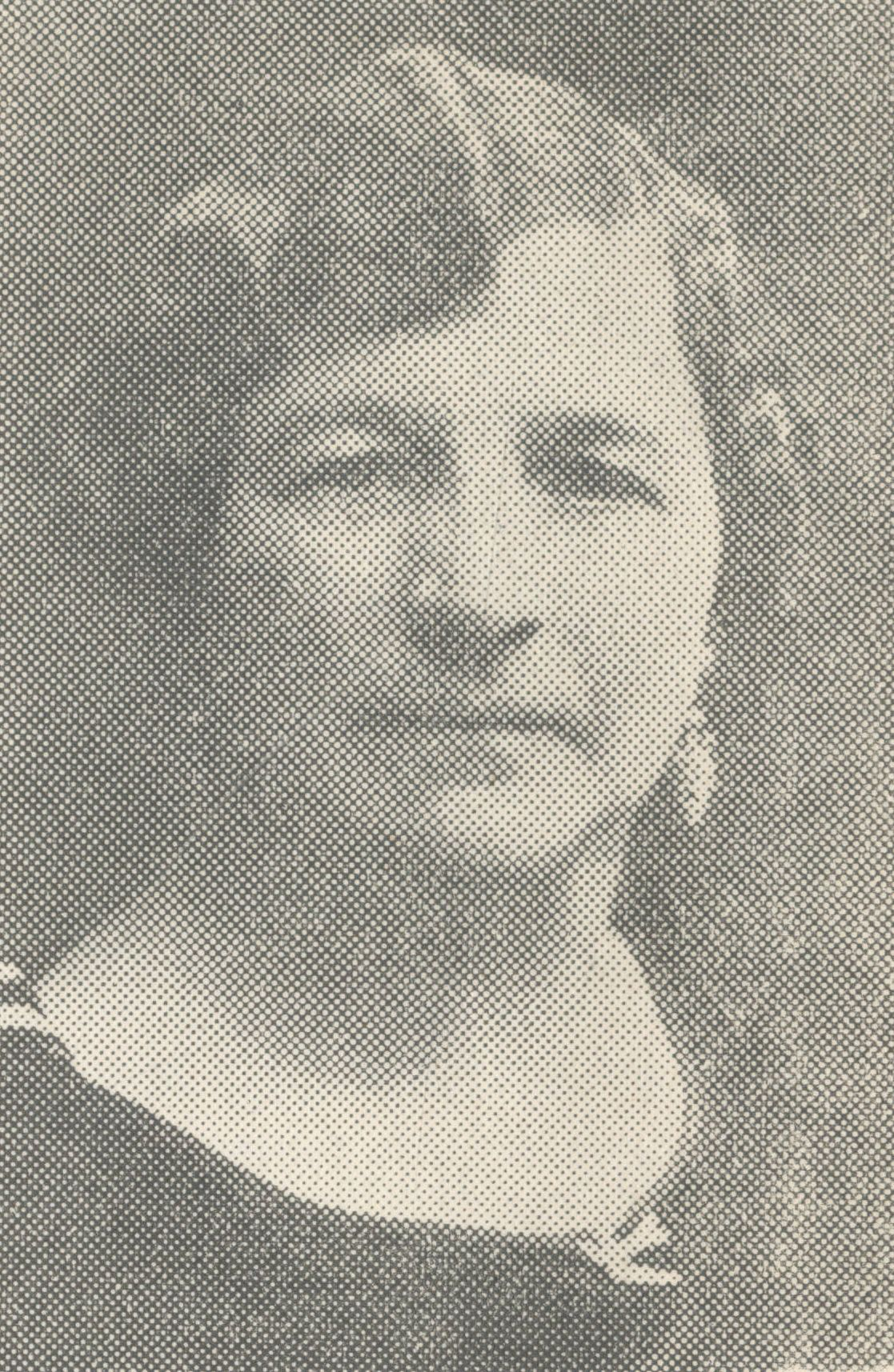
- Julia Salter Earle, ca. 1927
- Born: September 20, 1878; St. John's, Newfoundland
- Died: May 10, 1945 (aged 66)
- Occupations: Labour leader, engrossing clerk
- Organization: Ladies Branch of the Newfoundland Industrial Workers Association
- Known for: Social activism
- Spouse: Arthur Edward Earle
- Parent(s): Elizabeth Brown Chancey and William Thomas Hall Salter

Julia Salter Earle (1878-1945) was a noted labour leader and social activist in the early women’s movement in St. John's, the capital city of the Dominion of Newfoundland. She was one of the first women to run for political office in Newfoundland.

== Life ==
Julia Salter was born September 20, 1878, in St. John's, Newfoundland, the twelfth child of Elizabeth Brown Chancey and William Thomas Hall Salter. She attended Methodist College in St. John's. In 1903 she married Arthur Edward Earle, a St. John's jeweller and together they had six children. Salter Earle worked in paid employment as an engrossing clerk for the Newfoundland Legislative Assembly, preparing in script writing every law passed by the legislature. Her paid work gave Salter Earle a wide knowledge of the laws in Newfoundland, and supported her efforts with labour unions, in politics and community organizations. People often called upon her to settle disputes involving the law or a hardship they were enduring.

== Social activism and politics ==
Salter Earle was a community activist, fighting for workers' rights and against poverty and unemployment. In August 1918, the Ladies Branch of the Newfoundland Industrial Workers Association was formed, with Julia Salter Earle as President. This union represented women workers in clothing, cordage and shoe factories, among others, who were seeking better working conditions and wages, issues that had been ignored in Newfoundland. Salter Earle met with factory managers and owners to resolve factory floor issues and employee dismissals. She wrote letters to the newspaper raising concerns over poor wages and the use of child labour in factories.

Salter Earle also led representations to government on behalf of the unemployed. On 21 April 1921, Salter Earle and Edward J. Whitty, executive member of the Newfoundland Industrial Workers Association (NIWA), led a march of unemployed workers through downtown St. John's to the House of Assembly. There they presented a petition seeking government action to provide relief for the unemployed. A second march on 13 May 1921 challenged the promises of relief made by government; Salter Earle argued their efforts were not sufficient to address the plight of unemployed women and men.

In 1925, Salter Earle ran for a council seat as a local labour candidate in the St. John’s municipal election, the first election in which women were eligible to stand for election in Newfoundland. She was one of three women challenging for a seat; the others were May Kennedy and Fannie Knowling McNeil. Salter Earle’s campaign slogan was, “Vote for Julia, She Won’t Fool Ya”. She lost by only eleven votes. In the early 1940s she ran again but did not win a seat.

Although not successful in formal politics, Julia Salter Earle remained a strong supporter of those in need, sometimes giving food from her own table to the hungry who came to her door. She carried her concern for others into the Women’s Association of Cochrane Street Methodist Church and the Old Colony Club, previously known as the Ladies Reading Room and Current Events Club, a group of prominent women who focused on the child welfare movement and women’s enfranchisement.

Julia Salter Earle died, aged 67, on May 10, 1945.
