= Melitta Marxer =

Liechtensteiner activist

- Born: Melitta Kaiser; 8 September 1923; Schaanwald, Liechtenstein
- Died: 13 February 2015 (aged 91); Vaduz, Liechtenstein
- Occupation: Women's rights activist
- Years active: 1960s–1980s
- Known for: Speaking about women's suffrage at the Council of Europe in 1983

Melitta Marxer (8 September 1923 – 13 February 2015) was a Liechtensteiner activist who spent decades organizing and fighting for women's suffrage. She is most known for speaking at the Council of Europe in 1983 to gain international support for women's right to vote.

== Biography ==
Melitta Kaiser was born on 8 September 1923 in Schaanwald, Liechtenstein, and was raised there with her four siblings. After completion of her secondary schooling, Kaiser went to work in a ceramics factory. At age 25, she left the factory when she married Felix Marxer (1922–1997) in 1949 and began their family. As her three daughters grew up, she increasingly became aware of the inequalities and double standards facing women in Liechtenstein and the fact that only her husband could vote in elections. She supported her daughters in their desire for higher education and joined the fight for girls to be allowed to attend high school, which was attained in the 1960s.

What were we supposed to do? Just sit quietly in the hope that our political rights would be recognised? Had we merely done that, we would not have the right to vote today.

–Melitta Marxer

Marxer and other feminists then turned their attention to the referendum held in 1968 for women's suffrage, which failed. The women formed the Committee for Women's Suffrage (German: Komitée für das Frauenstimmrecht) to work towards gaining the vote. In 1971 and 1973, referendums failed with the majority blocking enfranchisement. Unable to make headway, in 1981, Marxer and other feminists formed Aktion Dornröschen, which technically means thorny rose, but was a play on words for the German name of the fairy tale "Sleeping Beauty". The women brought a complaint to the Constitutional Court charging that their rights had been abridged. In 1982, the case was dismissed. The government refused to reevaluate the situation, forcing Marxer and 11 other Sleeping Beauty activists to take other action. They traveled throughout Europe speaking about their lack of rights. In 1983, they arrived in Strasbourg, France, where Marxer and the others brought their concerns before the Council of Europe. The move brought criticism at home, for putting the country in the international spotlight, but it was effective. On 2 July 1984, the male voters in Liechtenstein granted full voting rights to women.

In 2002, a Swiss documentary, Die andere Hälfte, (The Other Half) was made, which told the story of Marxer and the struggle for women's rights in Liechtenstein. Marxer died on 13 February 2015.
