= Fannie Knowling McNeil =

Canadian suffragist and artist

Frances Knowling McNeil
- Fannie McNeil, c. 1910
- Born: Frances Knowling; March 14, 1869; St. John's, Canada
- Died: February 23, 1928 (aged 58)
- Known for: Painting Women's Suffrage
- Spouse: Hector

Frances "Fannie" Knowling McNeil (14 March 1869 – 23 February 1928) was a suffragist and artist from the Dominion of Newfoundland.

== Life ==
McNeil was born in St. John's, Newfoundland and Labrador. Her parents, George and Elizabeth (Upham) Knowling, had both been born in Devon in England and were supporters of women's rights. She was partially educated in England where she likely received her art education. Her parents were affluent and financially comfortable and in time her father would be on the legislative council. She was a prominent social activist for not only women's rights but also child welfare, literacy, and other issues. McNeil became a leading member of Newfoundland's Women's Franchise League, which formed in 1920 to advocate for women's suffrage. McNeil served as the League's secretary and her home became its headquarters. Her many public talks and letters to the editor made McNeil one of the most well-known suffragists in the dominion.

In 1925, the Franchise League finally won women the right to vote in Newfoundland. That same year, McNeil, alongside May Kennedy and Julia Salter Earle, became the first three women to seek political office in the dominion, when they ran in the St. John's municipal election. All three women were defeated, although Earle came within 11 votes of victory.

Also in 1925, McNeil and fellow artist Albert Edward Harris founded the Newfoundland Society of Art. They began by arranging exhibitions of the work of local artists as well as showing foreign art under the auspices of the existing Colony Club.

McNeil and her husband Hector had a son (who died in infancy) and two daughters. McNeil died of cancer on February 23, 1928.
