= Celina Guimarães Viana =

Brazilian teacher (1890–1972)

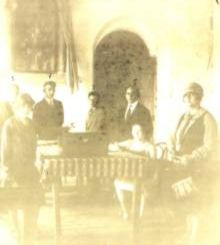
Celina Guimarães Viana, voting in Mossoro

Celina Guimarães Viana (Natal, Rio Grande do Norte, 15 November 1890 - Belo Horizonte, 11 July 1972) was a Brazilian professor and suffragist. She was the first woman to vote legally in Brazil, although Isabel de Mattos Dillon claimed to have voted in 1887. She did so on 5 April 1928 in the city of Mossoró.

She was the daughter of José Eustáquio de Amorim Guimarães and Eliza Amorim Guimarães. She studied at the Normal School of Natal, where she completed the course in teacher training. It was at this same school that she met Elyseu de Oliveira Viana, a young student from Pirpirituba, whom she married in December 1911. In 1912, she went to Acari and on 13 January 1914, moved to Mossoró. With the enactment of Law No. 660 of 25 October 1927, Rio Grande do Norte became the first state that, in regulating the "Electoral Service in the State," established that there would be no more "distinction of sex" for the exercise of suffrage.
