= National Anthem of the Kingdom of Yugoslavia =

Himna Srba, Hrvata i Slovenaca (1919–1929) Himna Kraljevine Jugoslavije (1929–1941)
English: Anthem of the Serbs, Croats, and Slovenes (1919–1929) Anthem of the Kingdom of Yugoslavia (1929–1941)
- Former national anthem of the Kingdom of Yugoslavia
- Lyrics: Jovan Đorđević, Antun Mihanović, and Simon Jenko, (Note: Đorđević wrote "Bože pravde", Mihanović wrote "Lijepa naša domovino", and Jenko wrote "Naprej zastava slave".) 1918 (Note: Arranged in 1918, lyrics' dates vary.)
- Music: Davorin Jenko and Josif Runjanin, (Note: Jenko composed "Bože pravde" and "Naprej zastava slave"; Runjanin composed "Lijepa naša domovino".) 1918 (Note: Arranged in 1918, compositions' dates vary.)
- Adopted: 1919
- Relinquished: 1941
- Preceded by: "Bože pravde" (as Kingdom of Serbia) "Ubavoj nam Crnoj Gori (as Kingdom of Montenegro) "Gott erhalte Franz den Kaiser" (as part of Austria-Hungary) "Shumi Maritsa" and "Anthem of His Majesty the Tsar" (as part of Kingdom of Bulgaria)
- Succeeded by: "Hey, Slavs" (as Socialist Yugoslavia) "Deutschlandlied" and "Horst-Wessel-Lied" (as part of Nazi Germany) "Lijepa naša domovino" (as part of Independent State of Croatia) "Marcia Reale" and "Giovinezza" (as part of Fascist Kingdom of Italy) "Himnusz" (as part of Kingdom of Hungary) "Shumi Maritsa" and "Anthem of His Majesty the Tsar" (as part of Kingdom of Bulgaria)

Audio sample
- Instrumental rendition: file; help

The Anthem of the Kingdom of Yugoslavia (Note: Serbo-Croatian: Himna Kraljevine Jugoslavije, Химна Краљевине Југославије) was created in December 1918 from the national anthems of the Kingdom's three historical constituent lands: Kingdom of Croatia-Slavonia (Croatia), Kingdom of Serbia (Serbia) and Duchy of Carniola (Slovenia).

At the time, the Yugoslav authorities considered the three dominant South Slavic ethnic groups – Croats, Serbs, and Slovenes – as three interchangeable names for one ethnic group (Serbo-Croatian and Slovene: narod "nation" or "people"), while the Pan-Slavic politicians and parts of academia viewed them as three subgroups of one South Slavic nation (Croatian: Jugoslaveni, Serbian: Jugosloveni, Југословени Slovene: Jugoslovani; "Yugoslavs"). Accordingly, the official language was thus called Serbo-Croato-Slovene. (Note: In practice however, Slovene was given no leeway as the language was a standardized form of much more widely used Shtokavian dialect of Serbo-Croatian, written in both Gaj's Latin and Serbian Cyrillic. The dialects of the languages, however, form a coherent Western South Slavic dialect continuum, where Kajkavian dialect merges into Slovene dialects. The anthem itself was partially in Slovene.)

== History ==
Although a law on the national anthem did not exist, the anthems of all three South Slavic nations were unified into a single anthem of the Kingdom. It started with the first part of the Serbian anthem "Bože pravde", continued with the first verse of the Croatian anthem "Lijepa naša domovino", which were in turn followed by first verse the de facto Slovenian anthem "Naprej zastava slave". The anthem finished with the refrain of the first verse of the Serbian anthem again.

It was officially used between 1919 and 1941; there was no official document that declared it invalid or void. The Constitution of the Kingdom of Yugoslavia was not in effect after the April capitulation.

== Lyrics ==
Serbo-Croatian and Slovene lyrics

Cyrillic script

Боже правде, ти што спасе
Од пропасти до сад нас,
Чуј и од сад наше гласе,
И од сад нам буди спас!

Љепа наша домовино,
Ој јуначка земљо мила,
Старе славе дједовино,
Да би вазда сретна била!

𝄆 Напреј застава славе,
На бој јунашка кри!
За благор очетњаве
Нај пушка говори! 𝄇

Боже спаси, Боже храни
Нашег Краља и наш род!
Краља Петра, Боже храни, (Note: This verse was changed to "Краља Александра, Боже храни," ("God sustain and guide King Alexander") during the reign of Alexander I of Yugoslavia.)
Моли ти се сав наш род.

Latin script

Bože pravde, ti što spase
Od propasti do sad nas,
Čuj i od sad naše glase,
I od sad nam budi spas!

Lijepa naša domovino,
oj junačka zemljo mila,
Stare slave djedovino,
Da bi vazda sretna bila!

𝄆 Naprej zastava slave,
Na boj junaška kri!
Za blagor očetnjave
Naj puška govori! 𝄇

Bože spasi, Bože hrani
Našeg Kralja i naš rod!
Kralja Petra, Bože hrani,
Moli ti se sav naš rod.

English lyrics

God of Justice; Thou who saved us
when in deepest bondage cast,
Hear Thy Serbian children's voices,
Be our help as in the past.

Our beautiful homeland,
Oh heroic, dear land,
Fatherland of old glory,
May you be forever blissful.

𝄆 Onward, banner of glory,
to battle, heroic blood!
for the sake of the fatherland
let the rifles sound! 𝄇

God save, God sustain,
Our king and our people!
God sustain King Peter,
All our people pray to you.

== See also ==
- „Hej Sloveni“
