= Zhivkov (disambiguation) =

Zhivkov (Bulgarian: Живков) is a Bulgarian masculine surname; its feminine counterpart is Zhivkova. It may refer to:

- Todor Zhivkov (1911–1998), Bulgarian head of state
- Lyudmila Zhivkova (1942–1981), Bulgarian Communist Party functionary, daughter of Todor
- Hristo Zhivkov (1975–2023), Bulgarian actor
- Nikola Zhivkov (1847–1901), Bulgarian educator
