= Shumi Maritsa =

Former Bulgarian national anthem from (1885–1947)

Šumi Marica
English: "Maritza/Maritsa Rushes"
- Шуми Марица
- National anthem of the Principality of Bulgaria (1885–1908); National anthem of the Kingdom of Bulgaria (1908–1946); National anthem of the People's Republic of Bulgaria (1946–1947)
- Also known as: Bulgarian: „Черняев марш“ (English: "Chernyaev March")
- Lyrics: Nikola Zhivkov, 1876; Major revision in 1912 by Ivan Vazov; Minor revision in 1914 by Ivan Vazov
- Music: Alexander Kosmar, 1839
- Adopted: 1885
- Relinquished: 1947
- Preceded by: "God Save the Tsar!" "National Anthem of the Kingdom of Yugoslavia"
- Succeeded by: "Our Republic, Hail!"

Audio sample
- 1910s recording using the original 1876 lyrics: file; help

"Maritza/Maritsa Rushes", (Note: Bulgarian: Шуми Марица, romanized: Šumi Marica, pronounced [ʃo̝ˈmi mɐˈritsɐ]) also known as the "Chernyaev March", (Note: Bulgarian: Черняев марш, romanized: Černjaev marš, pronounced [tʃɛrˈɲa̟(j)ɛf marʃ]) was the Bulgarian national anthem from 1886 until 1947. The music was derived from the German folk song Wenn die Soldaten durch die Stadt marschieren that was popular in Bulgaria during the mid-19th century. The original text was written by Nikola Zhivkov, a head teacher in Veles (now in North Macedonia). The lyrics were edited many times, most notably in 1912 by the poet Ivan Vazov. The title refers to the Maritsa, a river in the Balkans.

== History ==
=== History of the melody ===
In 1839 in Breslau, the poet Alexander Kosmar created the satirical farce "The Pirates". Originally, the song was performed with entertainment and satirical sense in cabarets. It quickly gained popularity, and soon the melody of the song became the German song "Wenn die Soldaten durch die Stadt marschieren".

The melody of the anthem was introduced to Bulgaria by Atanas Gratinski. He heard the song in the city of Shumen, when the Crocus Orchestra from Hungarian emigrants that settled in the city performed the German song „Wenn die Soldaten durch die Stadt marschiern“ ("When the Soldiers March Through the City"). The melody inspired Gratinski to adjust the song to the poem Sunshine which he created between 1855 and 1856 and taught the song to his students. The song become popular in Bulgaria.

In the beginning of 1925, a competition for musical harmonization of the anthem was announced. The scientific archive of the Bulgarian Academy of Sciences maintains 15 projects for the composition, some of which composed anonymously, while the other projects was composed by Georgi Atanasov, Ivan Kasabov, Nikola Yordanov, Dobri Hristov and other composers.

In 1935 a proposal was made to merge this song with the royal anthem of Bulgaria. The proposal was worked on by Pancho Vladigerov and Menakhem Bensusan, but it eventually failed. However, after the project, the royal anthem was performed after "Maritza Roars" without interruption.

=== History of the lyrics ===
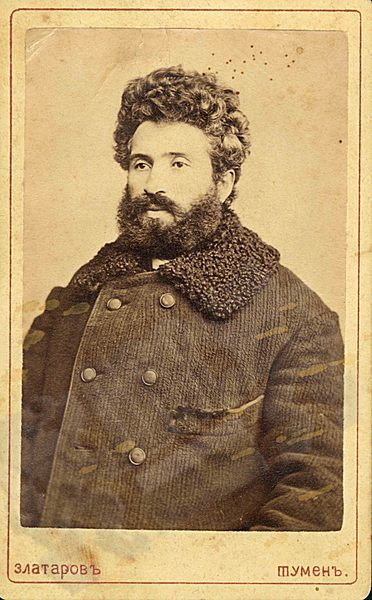
Nikola Zhivkov

Nikola Zhivkov created the lyrics of the song when he was among the Bulgarian volunteers who participated in the Serbian-Turkish war that broke out in 1876. He created the song because of his admiration to the personality and charisma of General Mikhail Chernyayev, who commands the Bulgarian volunteers. The song was originally composed under the title of "Chernyaev March". The melody of the song was inspired by the musical poem Sunshine.

The "Chernyaev March" was first published in 1877 in the newspaper Sekidnevni Novinar by S.P. Bobekov, and then in 1878 in the album Gusla i pesni.

The title of the song was later changed to „Shumi Maritza“ at the play Ilyo Voyvoda. The song was published at the end of the play.

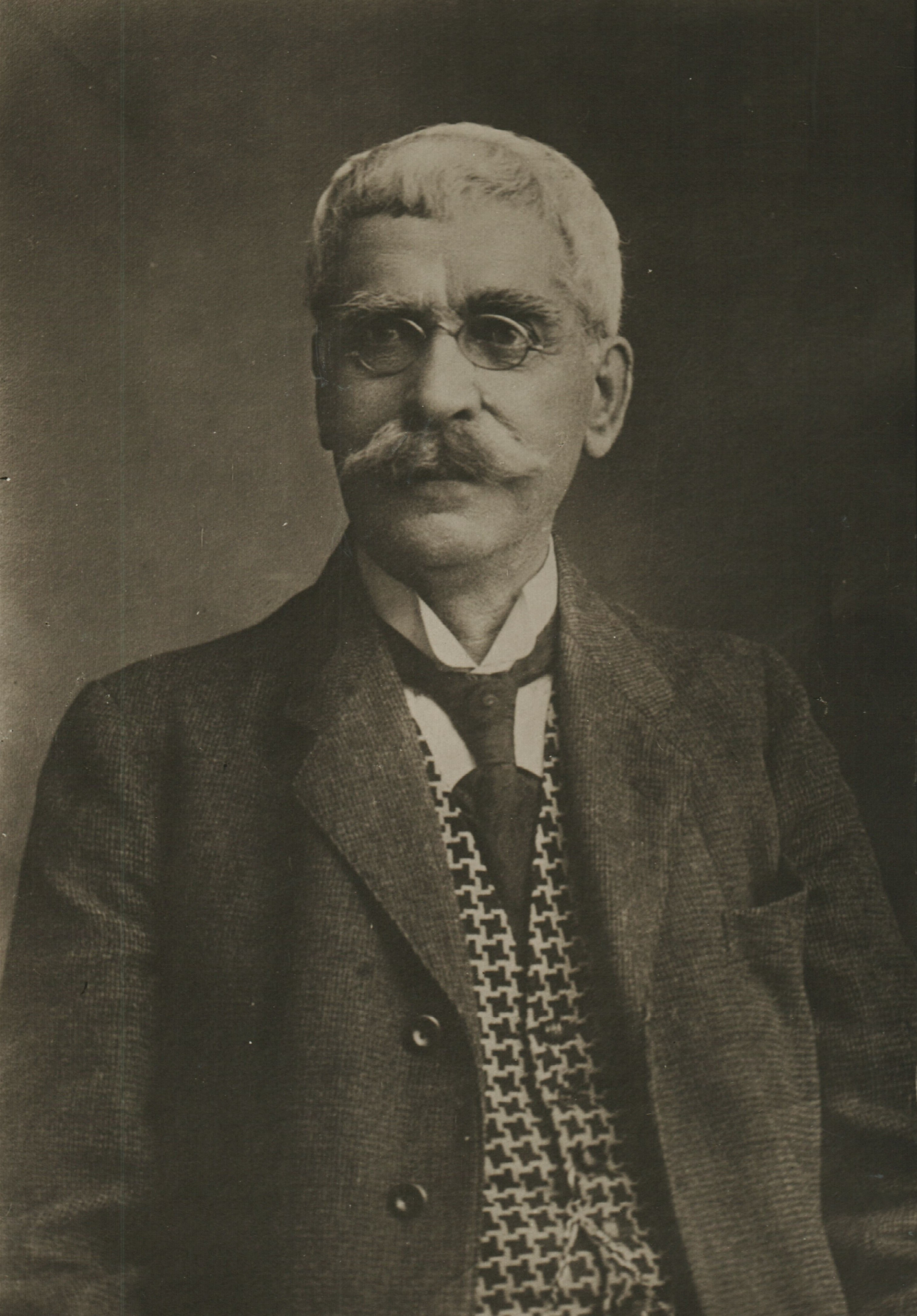
Ivan Vazov

The lyrics of the song underwent a major revision by poet Ivan Vazov in 1912. Covered by the patriotic enthusiasm after the first victories during the Balkan War, the folk poet wrote almost entirely new lyrics of the song, borrowing motifs from his own poem Maritza rushes bloodily, which would be the first and second line of the song. He published it for the first time on 4 December 1912 with the following editorial note:

For a long time, a necessary reference was made to the text of the historic Bulgarian march, written as it is known, by the late Nikola Zhivkov. His rhythm text, which does not always correspond to the music of a march, connects unlucky poems, and these flaws unpleasantly annoy the ear and taste of the singing of 'Shumi Maritza'. With the ubiquitous admiration that today's warfare arouses on this march, its textual corrections have become imperative to have the world in the mood of its kind.

— Ivan Vazov

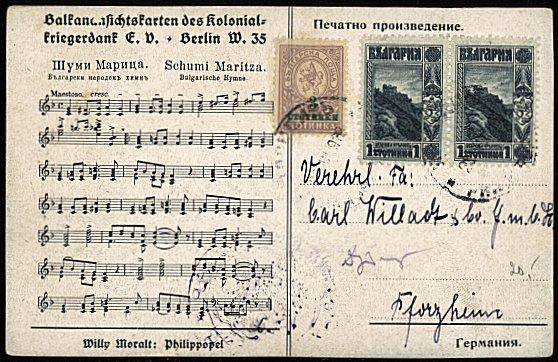
Shumi Maritsa in a German postcard from World War I.

Another minor revision was done in 1914. The revision appeared in the poem collection Under the Thunder of Victories. Because of the World War I, the revision gained small attention. This has led Ivan Vazov to republish the text in his poem Songs for Macedonia 1913–1916 printed in 1916 with the following remark:

Unfortunately, today, it was a habit, perhaps our unpardonable tastelessness, 'Shumi Maritza' is sung when it becomes necessary, most of the old stupid text, which we are ashamed of foreigners when they are translated. That's why, hoping to be remembered by everyone, I reprinted this revision of our anthem.

— Ivan Vazov

There are some other attempts to revise the text in the following years, but proved unsuccessful.

=== Usage of the anthem ===
The anthem was used as the official Bulgarian anthem from the Bulgarian unification in 1885, and was relinquished in 1947, replaced by the anthem "Our Republic, Hail!".

==== Notable performances of the anthem ====
The anthem was last played as the national anthem of Bulgaria on 1 January 1947 by the Red Army's Alexandrov Ensemble, at a reception given by the President of the 6th Grand National Assembly, Vasil Kolarov.

According to the newspaper "Fatherland Front", the Botev celebrations in Bulgaria was opened on 2 June 1947 with "Maritza Rushes".

=== Status of the anthem in the Bulgarian People's Republic ===
The anthem served as a de facto anthem in the Bulgarian People's Republic, due to the absence of mention of the anthem at the constitution of that time, the Dimitrov Constitution.

During the era of the Bulgarian People's Republic, "Maritza Rushes" is almost always associated negatively. During these times, the lyricist Ivan Vazov was considered a petite bourgeoisie. During the regime, the song was considered to be written by a bourgeois poet, performed during bourgeois times, and was reminiscent of the monarchical regime. Even though the anthem was considered bourgeois, there was no indication that the anthem was banned during the regime.

=== Proposals of the readoption of the anthem ===
During the discussion for the new constitution of Bulgaria in the 7th Grand National Assembly, there are some proposals submitted for a new anthem. The most popular proposal include the readoption of "Maritza Rushes" as the national anthem of Bulgaria.

== Performance of the anthem in the battlefield ==
The anthem was the standard march of the Bulgarian Army in the battlefield. During the Serbo-Bulgarian War and the Balkan Wars, the Bulgarian Army fought while chanting the anthem's lyrics. The military orchestra constantly plays the anthem during the battle, even when their instruments are shot by enemy bullets and broken by grenades.

=== Russo-Turkish War ===
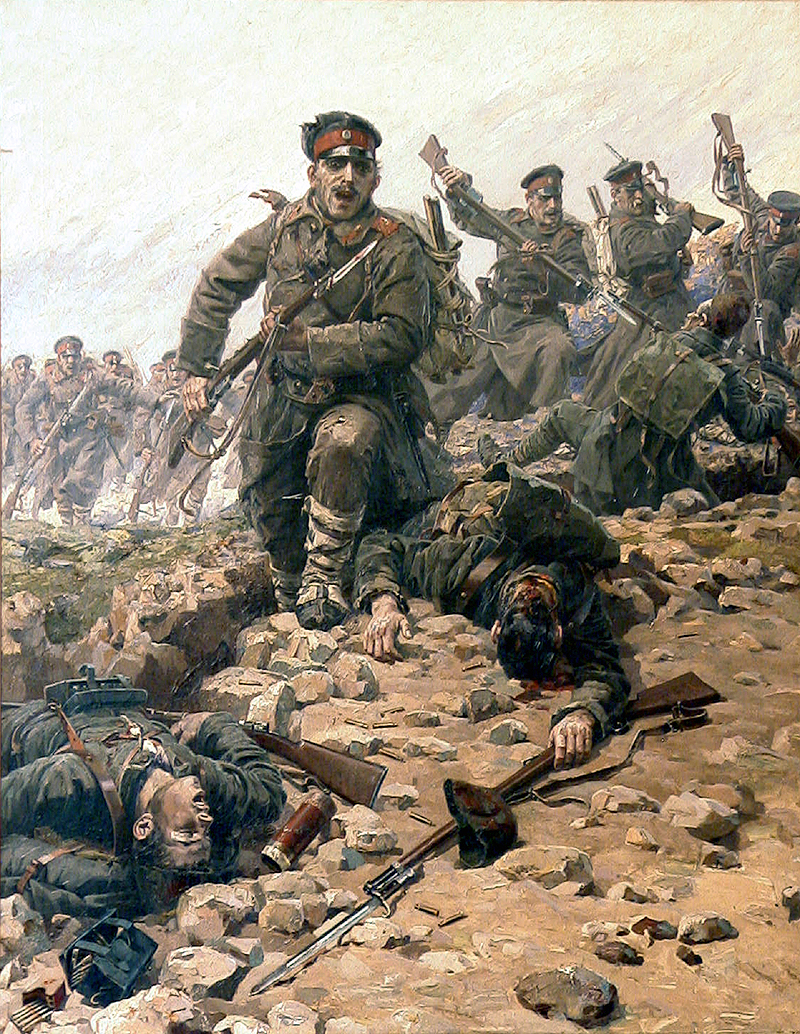
Illustration of the bayonet charge.

During the Second Battle of Shipka Pass in the Russo-Turkish War, the Russian command saw that the spiked position couldn't be held back any more. General Stoletov, the commander of the Bulgarian forces, took a decision to retreat. The Russian regiments retreat along the Gabrovo highway to slow Turkish troops. The Bulgarian volunteers were at the Shipka Peak, while the Turkish forces were en route to capture the Bulgarian positions. Bravely, Major Chilyayev stood on a rock and sang "Maritza Rushes". When they heard it, the volunteers stopped and slammed their march, and threw themselves in a bayonet charge. The Turks saw the frenzied Bulgarians in front of them and retreated from their position.

=== Serbo-Bulgarian War ===
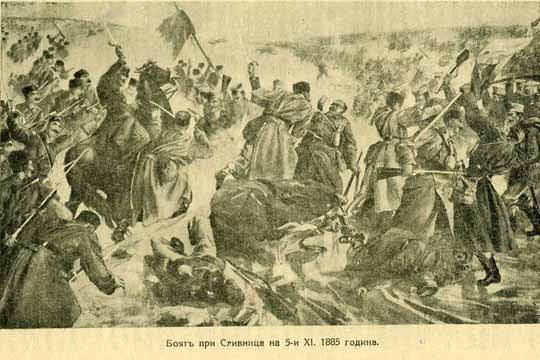
Sketch of the attack of the Bulgarian Army taking Serbian positions.

During the Battle of Slivnitsa, part of the Serbo-Bulgarian War in 1885, a large group of the Serbian Army was defending their positions at Slivnitsa and was reinforced before by a 135-kilometer march from southern Bulgaria to the Slivnitsa position. When the two battalions of the Serbian Army' Danubian Regiment arrived on the battlefield, Captain Benderev as the commander of the Bulgarian Army issued order to take Serbian positions immediately. This attack of the Danube Regiment is the most glorious and most important moment in Bulgarian history. Without a fight, in the performance of "Maritza Rushes", the Danube Regiment quickly climbed on a steep cliff. When the Serbian Army heard the lyrics, they escaped panically. The attack by the Bulgarian Army ended the battle with the Serbs retreating.

=== Balkan Wars ===
==== First Balkan War ====
On 16 October 1912, at Karaağaç, the commander of the 18th King Ferdinand I regiment, Lieutenant Colonel Antonov saw the advancing Turkish infantry battalions. He took over the regal shrine and with a sword taken out, under the anthem's lyrics performed by the regimental brass band, he led the attack of his army. The attacking forces of the Turkish Army were dismissed, and the regiment's advance and division continued with complete success.

On the night of 12 March 1913, the commander of the 23rd "Shipka" Infantry Regiment received the task of storming the Ayvaz Baba, a fort in the eastern sector of the Edirne defence. The regiment commander, Colonel Ivan Pashinov, judged that he would not be able to pass the wire barriers on the fortress. Nevertheless, he brought with him the regimental flag and, during the performance of "Maritza Rushes" by the regimental music, he led his regiment forward. Under a hail of bullets and shrapnels, the regiment overcame the enemy wire barriers, and at approximately 5:30 pm on 13 March, the regimental flag waved over the captured Ayvaz Baba fort.

==== Second Balkan War ====
During the Second Balkan War in the summer of 1913, when the Modra Wall (Serbia) attacked, the 34th "Trojan" Infantry Regiment, headed by its captain, found itself behind the right wing of the Serbs. Frightened by the setting, he ordered the musicians to lie down in a clearing. At that time Trojans started the attack. The Captainmaster raises his subordinates and the boxing music starts playing "Shumi Maritza". This gives forces to the attackers, and the enemy begins escaping, as during the Serbian-Bulgarian War. Of the captured prisoners, it is understood that against the Bulgarian four companies, the Serbian command has opposed an infantry brigade with two artillery batteries and 22 machine guns. To the question of why their escapes have left their positions, the captives responded.

== Lyrics ==
=== 1914 revision ===
Bulgarian original

Cyrillic script

Шуми Марица
окървавена,
Плаче вдовица
люто ранена.

Припев:
Марш, марш,
с генерала наш!
В бой да летим,
враг да победим!

Български чеда,
цял свят ни гледа.
Хай към победа
славна да вървим.

Припев

Левът Балкански
в бой великански
С орди душмански
води ни крилат.

Припев

Млади и знойни,
във вихри бойни.
Ний сме достойни
лаври да берем.

Припев

Ний сме народа,
за чест и свобода,
За мила рода
който знай да мре.

Припев

Latin script

Šumi Marica
okǎrvavena,
Plače vdovica
ljuto ranena.

Pripev:
Marš, marš,
s generala naš!
V boj da letim,
vrag da pobedim!

Bǎlgarski čeda,
cjal svjat ni gleda.
Haj kǎm pobeda
slavna da vǎrvim.

Pripev

Levǎt Balkanski
v boj velikanski
s ordi dušmanski
vodi ni krilat.

Pripev

Mladi i znojni,
vǎv vihri bojni.
Nij sme dostojni
lavri da berem.

Pripev

Nij sme naroda,
za čest i svoboda,
za mila roda
kojto znaj da mre.

Pripev

IPA transcription

[ʃo.ˈmi mɐ.ˈri.t͡sɐ]
[o.kɐr.ˈva.vɛ.nɐ |]
[ˈpɫa.t͡ʃɛ vdo.ˈvi.t͡sɐ]
[ˈʎu.to rɐ.ˈnɛ.nɐ ‖]

[ˈpri.pɛf]
[marʃ | marʃ |]
[z‿gɛ.nɛ.ˈra.ɫɐ naʃ ‖]
[v‿bɔj da lɛ.ˈtim |]
[vrag da po.bɛ.ˈdim ‖]

[ˈbɤɫ.ɡɐr.ski t͡ʃɛ.ˈda |]
[t͡sʲaɫ svʲat ni ˈɡlɛ.dɐ ‖]
[xaj kɤm po.ˈbɛ.dɐ]
[ˈsɫav.nɐ da vɐr.ˈvim ‖]

[ˈpri.pɛf]

[ˈlɛ.vɐt bɐɫ.ˈkan.ski]
[v‿bɔj vɛ.li.ˈkan.ski]
[s‿or.ˈdi doʃˈ.man.ski]
[vo.ˈdi ni kri.ˈɫat ‖]

[ˈpri.pɛf]
[ˈmɫa.di i‿ˈznɔj.ni |]
[vɤv ˈvix.ri ˈbɔj.ni ‖]
[nij smɛ dos.ˈtɔj.ni]
[ˈɫav.ri da bɛ.ˈrɛm ‖]

[ˈpri.pɛf]

[nij smɛ nɐ.ˈrɔ.dɐ |]
[za t͡ʃɛst i‿svo.bo.ˈda |]
[za ˈmi.ɫɐ ro.ˈda]
[ˈkɔj.to znaj da mrɛ ‖]

[ˈpri.pɛf]

English translation

Maritza rushes,
stained with blood,
A widow wails,
fiercely wounded.

Chorus:
March, march,
with our general,
Let's fly into battle
and crush the foe!

Bulgarian children,
the whole world's watching.
Into a victorious battle,
let's gloriously go.

Chorus

The Balkan lion
into a titanic battle
with enemy hordes
leads us flying.

Chorus

Young and strong,
in the rattle of battle
We're destined to gain
laurels to claim.

Chorus

We're the nation,
for honor, for freedom,
for the dear fatherland
who knows how to die.

Chorus

=== 1912 revision ===
Bulgarian original

Cyrillic script

Шуми Марица
окървавена,
Плаче вдовица
в люти рани днес.

Припев:
Марш, марш,
Генералю наш!
На бой да летим,
враг да победим!

Български чеда,
цял свят ни гледа.
Хай към победа
славна да вървим.

Припев

Левът Балкански
в бой великански
С орди душмански
води ни крилат.

Припев

Сърцата наши,
юнашки, силни,
Смърт ги не плаши,
тупат за борба.

Припев

Ний сме народа,
за чест и свобода,
За мила рода
който знай да мре.

Припев

Latin script

Šumi Marica
okǎrvavena,
Plače vdovica
v ljuti rani dnes.

Pripev:
Marš, marš,
Generalju naš!
V boj da letim,
vrag da pobedim!

Bǎlgarski čeda,
cjal svjat ni gleda.
Haj kǎm pobeda
slavna da vǎrvim.

Pripev

Levǎt Balkanski
v boj velikanski
S ordi dušmanski
vodi ni krilat.

Pripev

Sǎrcata maši,
junaški, silni,
Smǎrt gi ne plaši,
tupat za borba.

Pripev

Nij sme naroda,
za čest i svoboda,
Za mila roda
kojto znaj da mre.

Pripev

IPA transcription

[ʃo.ˈmi mɐ.ˈri.t͡sɐ]
[o.kɐr.ˈva.vɛ.nɐ |]
[ˈpɫa.t͡ʃɛ vdo.ˈvi.t͡sɐ]
[ˈʎu.ti rɐ.ˈni dnɛs ‖]

[ˈpri.pɛf]
[marʃ | marʃ |]
[z‿gɛ.nɛ.ˈra.ʎu naʃ ‖]
[na bɔj da lɛ.ˈtim |]
[vrag da po.bɛ.ˈdim ‖]

[ˈbɤɫ.ɡɐr.ski t͡ʃɛ.ˈda |]
[t͡sʲaɫ svʲat ni ˈɡlɛ.dɐ ‖]
[xaj kɤm po.ˈbɛ.dɐ]
[ˈsɫav.nɐ da vɐr.ˈvim ‖]

[ˈpri.pɛf]

[ˈlɛ.vɐt bɐɫ.ˈkan.ski]
[v‿bɔj vɛ.li.ˈkan.ski]
[s‿or.ˈdi doʃ.ˈman.ski]
[vo.ˈdi ni kri.ˈɫat ‖]

[ˈpri.pɛf]

[sɐr.ˈt͡sa.tɐ ˈna.ʃi |]
[jo.ˈnaʃ.ki | ˈsiɫ.ni |]
[smɤrt gi nɛ ˈpɫa.ʃi |]
[ˈtu.pɐt za bor.ˈba ‖]

[ˈpri.pɛf]

[nij smɛ nɐ.ˈrɔ.dɐ |]
[za t͡ʃɛst i‿svo.bo.ˈda |]
[za ˈmi.ɫɐ ro.ˈda]
[ˈkɔj.to znaj da mrɛ ‖]

[ˈpri.pɛf]

English translation

Maritza rushes,
stained with blood,
A widow wails,
in hot wounds today.

Chorus:
March, march,
with our general,
Let's fly into battle
and crush the foe!

Bulgarian children,
the whole world's watching.
Into a victorious battle.
let's gloriously go.

Chorus

The Balkan lion
into a titanic battle
with enemy hordes
leads us flying.

Chorus

Our hearts,
heroic, strong,
we do not fear death,
we struggle to fight.

Chorus

We're the nation,
for honor, for freedom,
for the dear fatherland
who knows how to die.

Chorus

=== Original version from 1876 ===
The song in the book Gusle and Songs (Гусла съ пѣсни), from 1878.

Bulgarian original

Cyrillic script

Шюми Марица
укървавена,
Плачи вдовица
люту ранена

Припев:
Марш! Марш!
с Генераля наш
Раз, два, три –
марш! Войници.

Напред да ходим,
войници мили,
Тимок да бордим
със сички сили

Припев

Юнака донский
нам йе водител,
С пряпорец лъвский
вожд победител

Припев

Вижте деспоти,
генераля наш
Чуйте, запейте
Черняева марш

Припев

Войници храби
след него летят,
Порят ваздухът
и громко викат

Припев

С кървав остър меч
Генераля напред
Възглавя на сеч!
Гръм огън навред

Припев

Труба низ гора
за звони напред!
Хей ура, ура!
Ура напред!

Припев

Latin script

Šjumi Marica
ukǎrvavena,
Plači vdovica
ljutu ranena

Pripev:
Marš! Marš!
s Generalja naš
Raz, dva, tri –
marš! Vojnici.

Napred da hodim,
vojnici mili,
Timok da bordim
sǎs sički sili

Pripev

Junaka donskij
nam je voditel,
S prjaporec lǎvskij
vožd pobeditel

Pripev

Vižte despoti,
generalja naš
Čujte, zapejte
Černjaeva marš

Pripev

Vojnici hrabi
sled nego letjat,
Porjat vazduhǎt
i gromko vikat

Pripev

S kǎrvav ostǎr meč
Generalja napred
Vǎzglavja na seč!
Grǎm ogǎn navred

Pripev

Truba niz gora
za zvoni napred!
Hej ura, ura!
Ura napred!

Pripev

IPA transcription

[ʃo.ˈmi mɐ.ˈri.t͡sɐ]
[o.kɐr.ˈva.vɛ.nɐ |]
[ˈpɫa.t͡ʃi vdo.ˈvi.t͡sɐ]
[ˈʎu.to rɐ.ˈnɛ.nɐ ‖]

[ˈpri.pɛf]
[marʃ | marʃ |]
[z‿gɛ.nɛ.ˈra.ʎɐ naʃ ‖]
[raz | dva | tri |]
[marʃ | voj.ˈni.t͡si ‖]

[nɐ.ˈprɛd‿da ˈxɔ.dim |]
[voj.ˈni.t͡si ˈmi.li |]
[ˈti.mok ˈbɔr.dim]
[sɤs ˈsit͡ʃ.ki ˈsi.li ‖]

[ˈpri.pɛf]

[jo.ˈna.kɐ ˈdɔn.skij]
[nam jɛ vo.ˈdi.tɛɫ |]
[s‿ˈprʲa.po.rɛt͡s ˈɫɤf.ski]
[vɔʃt po.bɛ.ˈdi.tɛɫ ‖]

[ˈpri.pɛf]

[ˈviʃ.tɛ dɛs.ˈpɔ.ti |]
[gɛ.nɛ.ˈra.ʎɐ naʃ]
[ˈt͡ʃuj.tɛ | zɐ.ˈpɛj.tɛ]
[t͡ʃɛr.ˈɲa.(j)ɛ.vɐ marʃ ‖]

[ˈpri.pɛf]

[voj.ˈni.t͡si ˈxra.bi |]
[slɛt ˈnɛ.ɡo lɛ.ˈtʲɤt |]
[ˈpɔ.rʲɐd‿ˈvaz.do.xɐt]
[i‿ˈgrɔm.ko ˈvi.kɐt ‖]

[ˈpri.pɛf]

[s‿ˈkɤr.vɐf ˈɔs.tɐr mɛt͡ʃ]
[gɛ.nɛ.ˈra.ʎɐ nɐ.ˈprɛt]
[vɐz.ˈɡɫa.vʲɐ na sɛt͡ʃ ‖]
[grɤm ˈɔ.ɡɐn nɐ.ˈvrɛt]

[ˈpri.pɛf]

[tro.ˈba niz ɡo.ˈra]
[za zvo.ˈni nɐ.ˈprɛt ‖]
[xɛj o.ˈra | o.ˈra ‖]
[o.ˈra nɐ.ˈprɛt ‖]

[ˈpri.pɛf]

== See also ==
- Anthem of His Majesty the Tsar
- „Mila Rodino“
