= Kingdom of Bulgaria =

State in southeastern Europe from 1908 to 1946

Coordinates: 42°42′N 23°19′E

Tsardom of Bulgaria Царство България
- 1908–1946
- Flag Coat of arms (1927–1946)
- Motto: Съединението прави силата Saedinenieto pravi silata ("Unity makes strength")
- Anthem: Шуми Марица; Shumi Maritsa "Maritsa Rushes" Royal anthem: "Химн на Негово Величество Царя" "Himn na Negovo Velichestvo Tsarya" ("Anthem of His Majesty the Tsar")
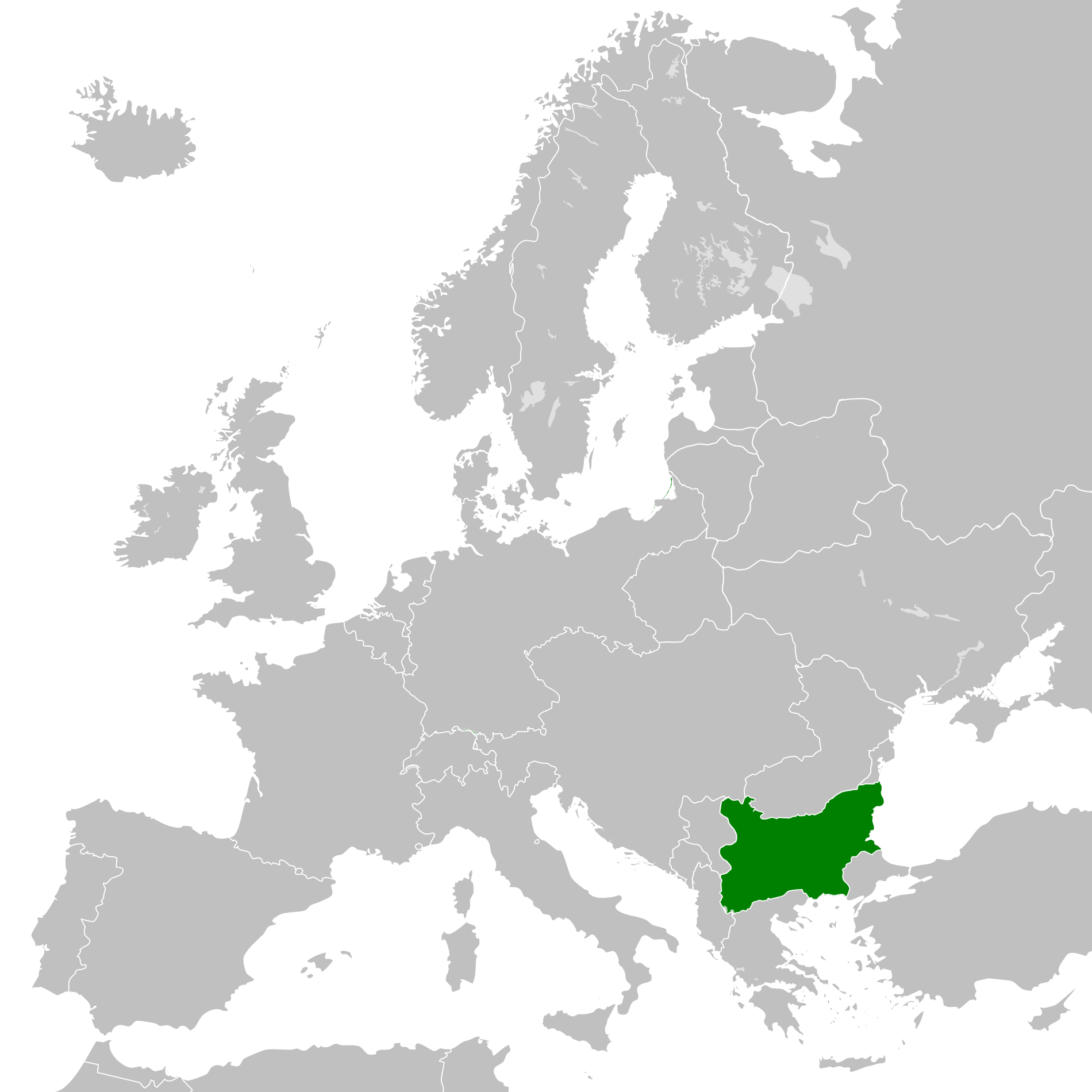
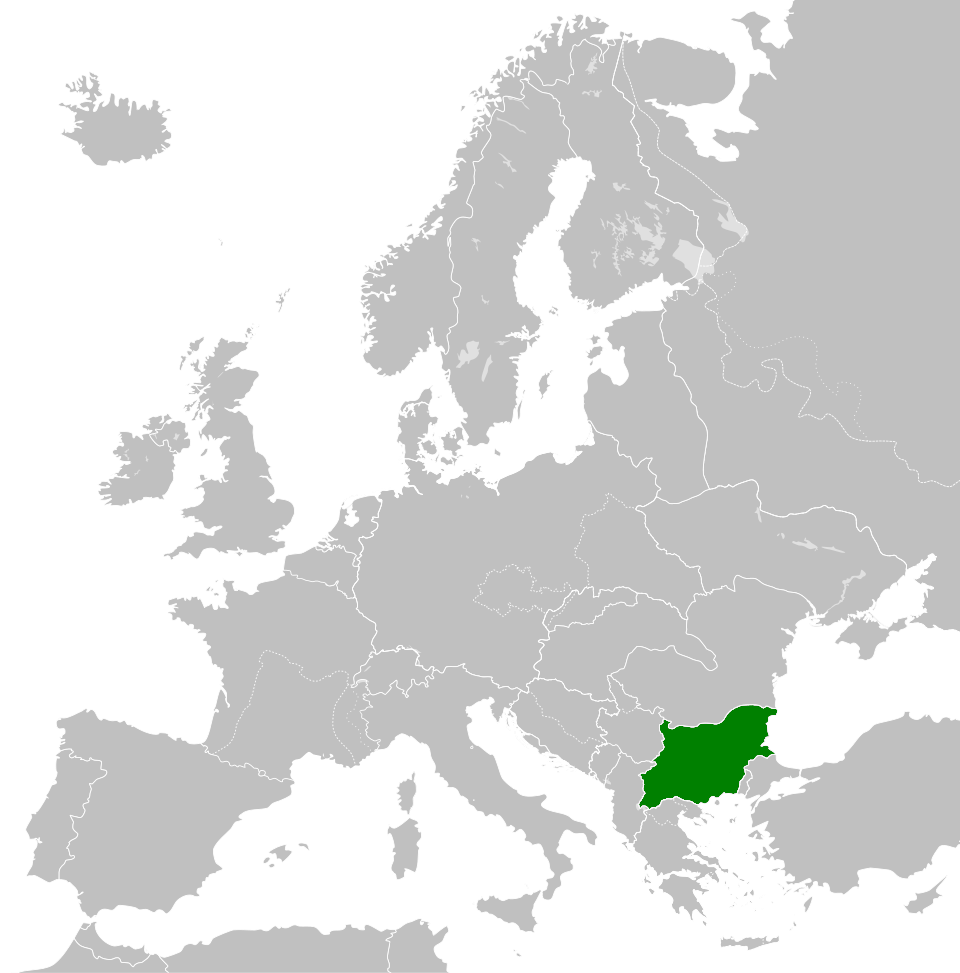

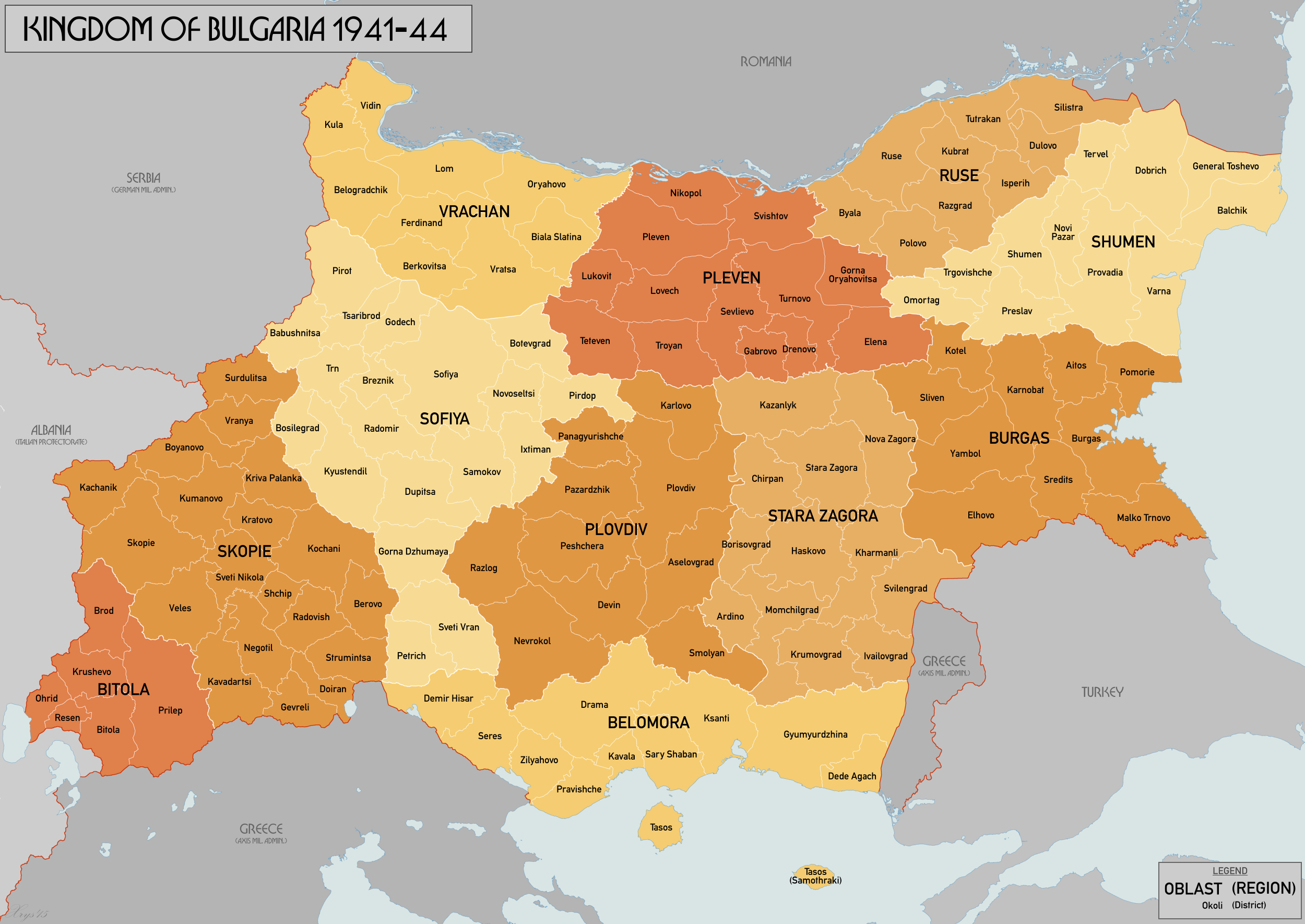
- Administrative divisions of the Tsardom of Bulgaria in 1942
- Capital and largest city: Sofia
- Official languages: Bulgarian
- Religion: Eastern Orthodoxy (state religion)
- Demonym: Bulgarian
- Government: Constitutional monarchy (1908–1935; 1943–1946) Authoritarian absolute monarchy (1935–1943) (de facto)
- Tsar
  - 1908–1918: Ferdinand I
  - 1918–1943: Boris III
  - 1943–1946: Simeon II
- Chairman of the Council of Ministers
  - 1908–1911 (first): Aleksandar Malinov
  - 1944–1946 (last): Kimon Georgiev
- Legislature: National Assembly
- Historical era: Balkan Wars; World War I; Interwar period; World War II
  - Independence declared: 5 October 1908
  - Balkan Wars: 1912–1913
  - Treaty of Bucharest: 10 August 1913
  - World War I: 1915–1918
  - Treaty of Neuilly: 27 November 1919
  - Coup d'état: 9 June 1923
  - Coup d'état: 19 May 1934
  - Counter-coup by Boris III: 1935
  - Treaty of Craiova: 7 September 1940
  - Coup d'état: 9 September 1944
  - Monarchy abolished: 15 September 1946

Area
- 1915: 122,134 km^{2} (47,156 sq mi)

Population
  - 1915: 4,580,000
- Currency: lev
Preceded by
Principality of Bulgaria
Kingdom of Yugoslavia
4th of August Regime
Succeeded by
People's Republic of Bulgaria
Democratic Federal Yugoslavia
Kingdom of Greece

The Tsardom of Bulgaria, (Note: Bulgarian: Царство България, romanized: Tsarstvo Bŭlgariya.) also known as the Third Bulgarian Tsardom, (Note: Bulgarian: Трето Българско Царство, romanized: Treto Bŭlgarsko Tsarstvo.) commonly known in English as the Kingdom of Bulgaria, or simply Bulgaria, was a constitutional monarchy in Southeastern Europe, which was established on 5 October [O.S. 22 September] 1908, when the Bulgarian state was raised from a principality to a tsardom.

Prince Ferdinand, founder of the royal family, was crowned as tsar at the Declaration of Independence, mainly because of his military plans and for seeking options for unification of all lands in the Balkans region with an ethnic Bulgarian majority (lands that had been seized from Bulgaria and given to the Ottoman Empire in the Treaty of Berlin). He and his successors were reckoned as kings internationally.

The state was frequently at war throughout its existence, lending to its nickname as "the Balkan Prussia". For several years, Bulgaria mobilized an army of more than 1 million people from its population of about 5 million, and in the 1910s it engaged in three wars – the First and Second Balkan Wars, and the First World War. Following the First World War the Bulgarian army was disbanded and forbidden to exist by the Allied Powers, and all plans for national unification of the Bulgarian lands failed.

Less than two decades later Bulgaria entered World War II on the side of the Axis powers and once again found itself on the losing side until it switched sides to the Allies in September 1944. In 1946, the monarchy was abolished, its final tsar was sent into exile, and the tsardom was replaced by the People's Republic of Bulgaria.

== History ==
=== Formation ===
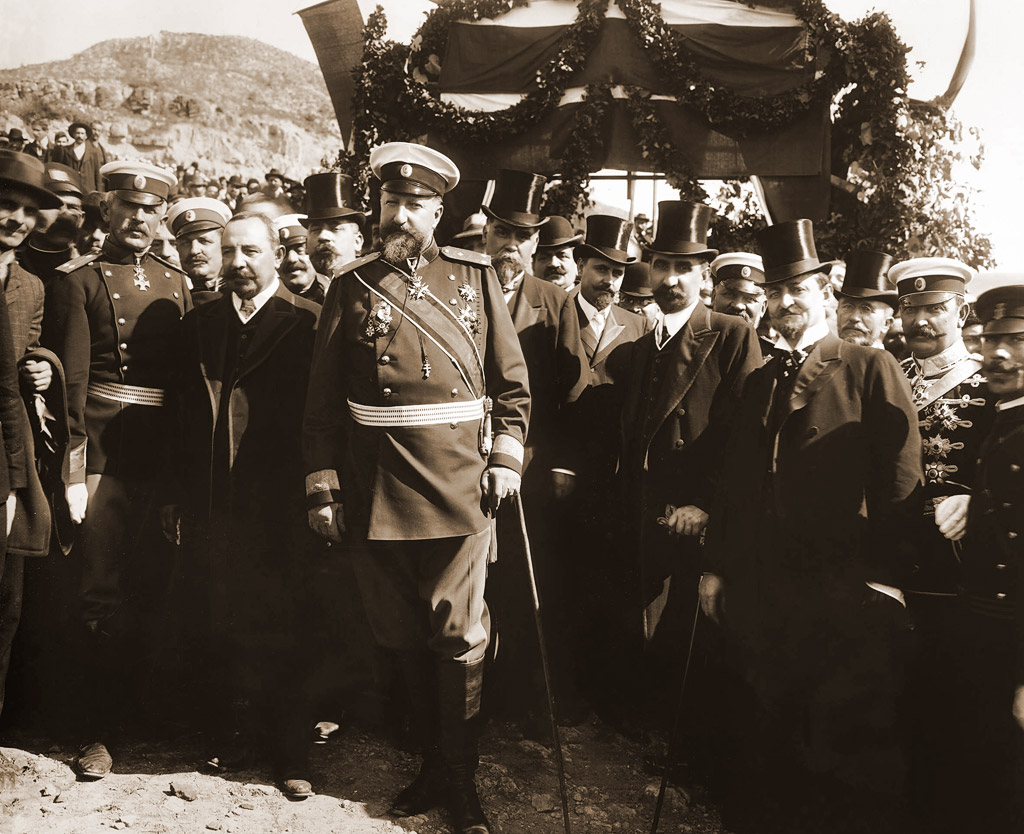
Ferdinand I of Bulgaria at the proclamation of Bulgarian independence, 1908

Despite the establishment of the Principality of Bulgaria (subject to Ottoman suzerainty) in 1878, and the subsequent Bulgarian control over Eastern Rumelia after 1885, there was a substantial Bulgarian population still living under Ottoman rule, particularly in Macedonia and Adrianople. To complicate matters, Serbia and Greece too made claims over parts of Macedonia, while Serbia, as a Slavic nation, also considered Macedonians as belonging to the Serbian nation. Thus began a five-sided struggle for control of these areas which lasted until 1912. In 1903 the Ilinden–Preobrazhenie Uprising broke out in Ottoman Macedonia, making war seem likely.

In the Aftermath of the Young Turk Revolution, Ferdinand used the struggles between the Great Powers to break free from Ottoman suzerainty. On 5 October 1908, Ferdinand declared the Independence of the Tsardom of Bulgaria at the Holy Forty Martyrs Church in Veliko Tarnovo, although since the introduction of the Gregorian calendar in 1916, this has been celebrated on September 22. Even before then, however, Bulgaria had only acknowledged the overlordship of the sultan formally. Since 1878, Bulgaria had had its own constitution, flag, and anthem, and conducted a separate foreign policy.

Ferdinand took the Bulgarian title "Tsar" in honor of the rulers of the First and Second Bulgarian Empires. However, while previous Bulgarian "tsars" were reckoned as emperors, Ferdinand and his successors were called "kings" outside Bulgaria. The Tarnovo Constitution was retained, with the word "tsar" replacing the word "prince" or ''knyaz''.

=== Balkan Wars ===
==== First Balkan War ====
In 1911 the Nationalist Prime Minister Ivan Geshov set about allying with Greece and Serbia, and the three allies agreed to put aside their rivalries to plan a joint attack on the Ottomans.

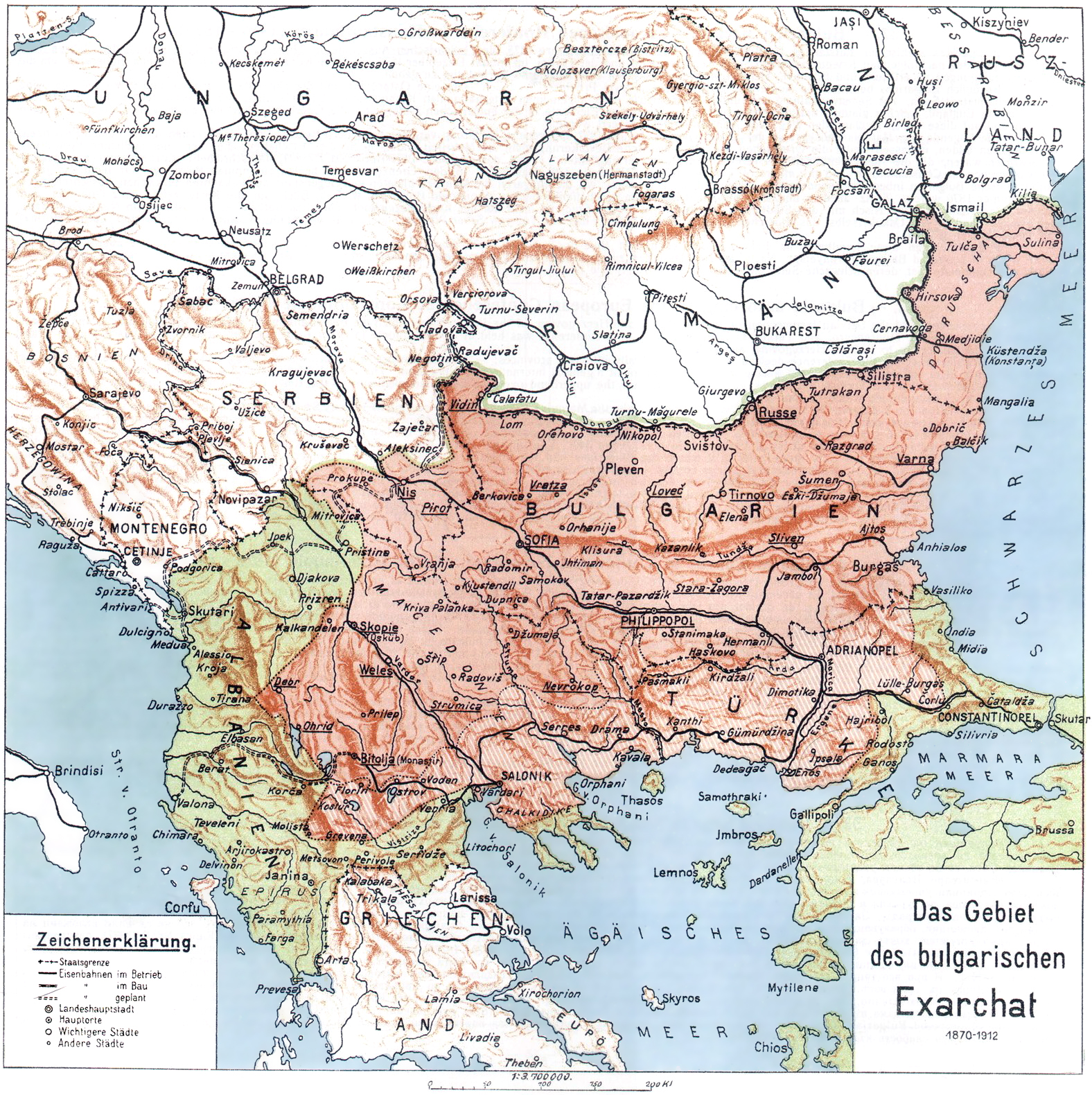
Map of the Bulgarian Exarchate (1870–1913)

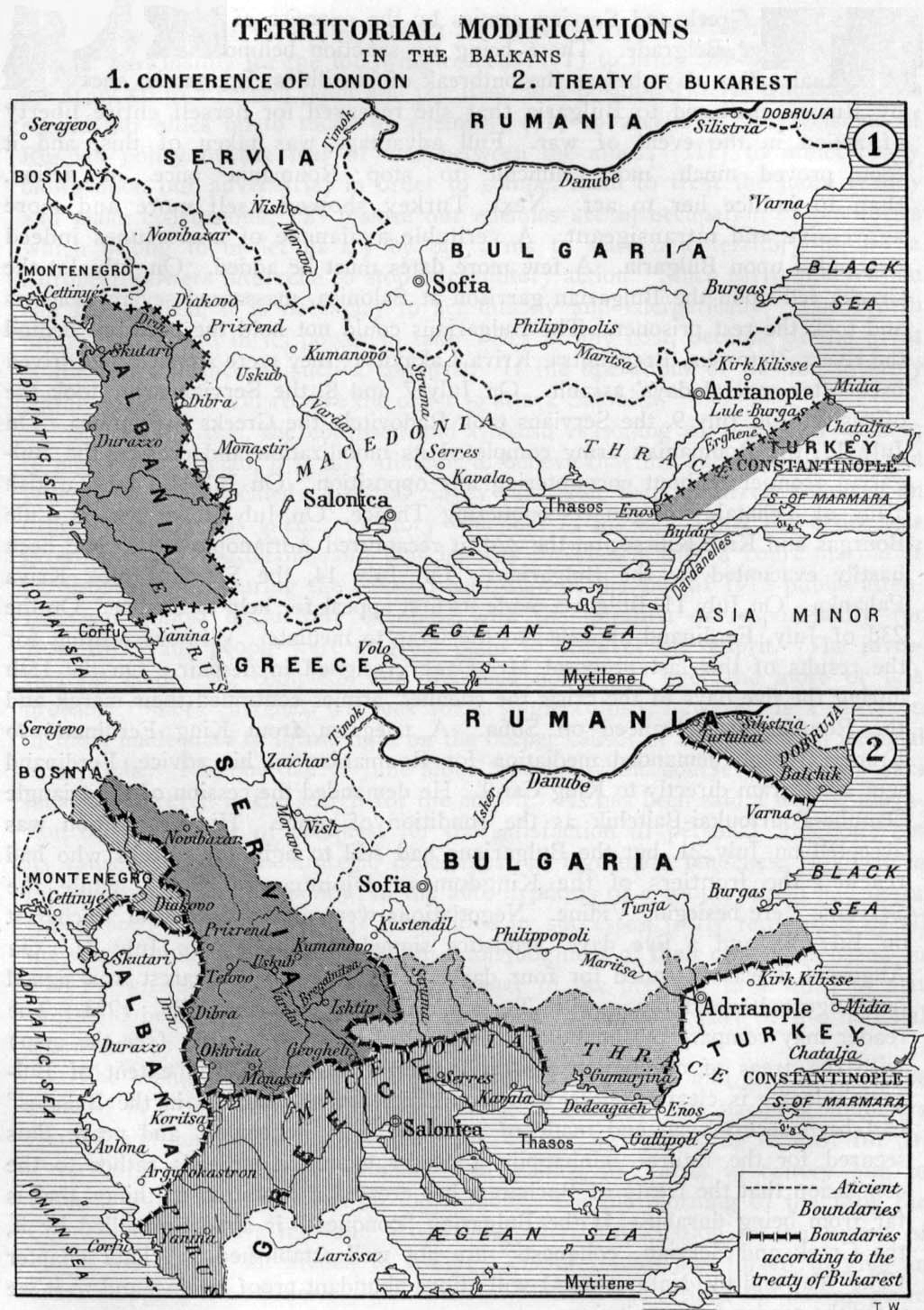
Boundaries on the Balkans after the First and the Second Balkan War (1912–1913)

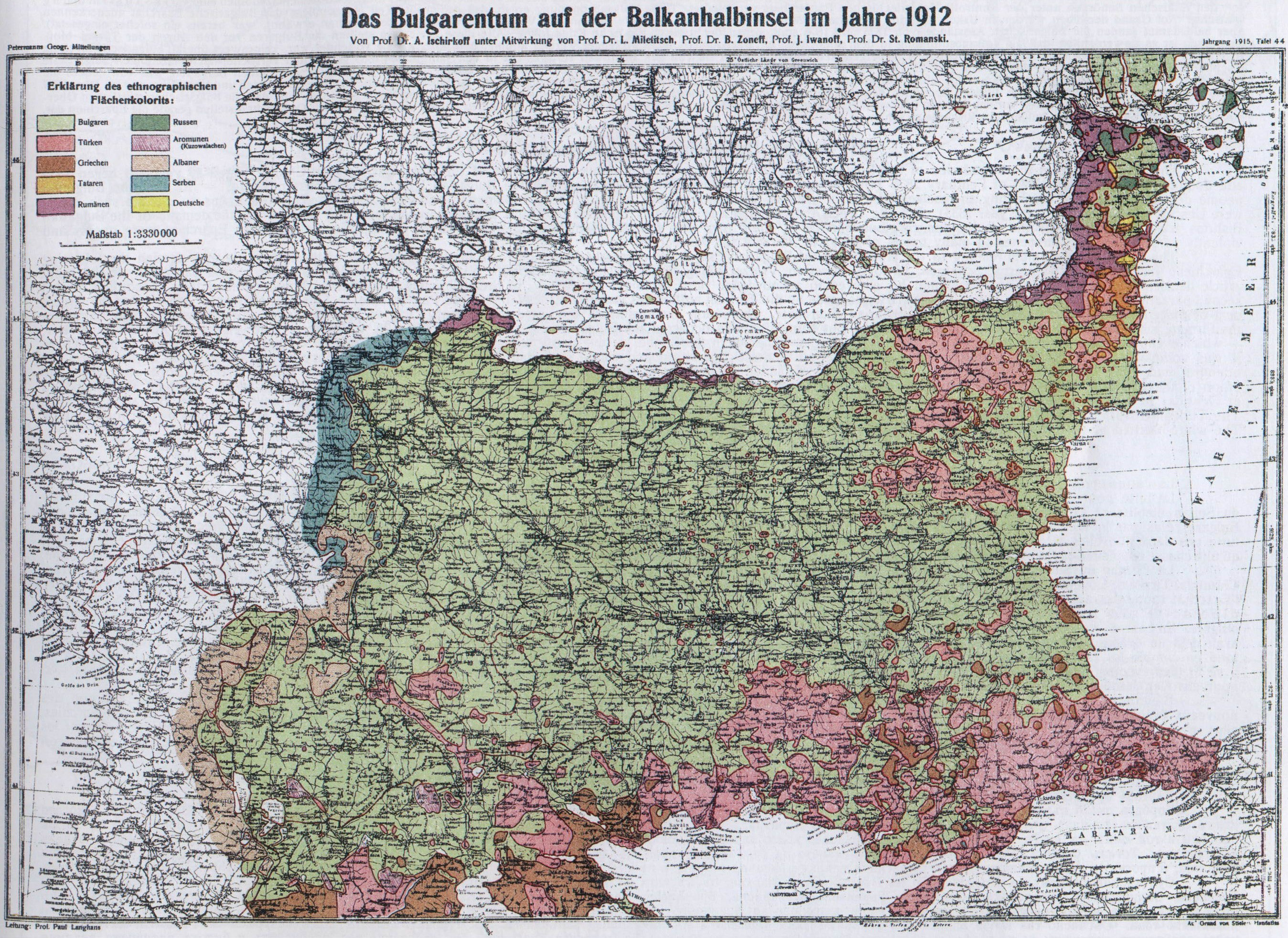
Areas where Bulgarians were the majority of the population (in light green) according to Anastas Ishirkov (1912).

In February 1912 a secret treaty was signed between Bulgaria and Serbia, which was firstly against Austria-Hungary, but also then redirected by Bulgaria to be against the Ottoman Empire and in May 1912 a similar treaty was signed with Greece. Montenegro was also brought into the pact. The treaties provided for the partition of Macedonia and Thrace between the allies, although the lines of partition were left dangerously vague. After the Ottomans refused to implement reforms in the disputed areas, the First Balkan War broke out in October 1912.

The allies had astonishing success. The Bulgarian army inflicted several crushing defeats on the Ottoman forces and advanced threateningly against Constantinople, while the Serbs and the Greeks took control of Macedonia. The Ottomans sued for peace in December. Negotiations broke down, and fighting resumed in February 1913. The Ottomans lost Adrianople to a joint Bulgarian and Serbian task force. A second armistice followed in March, with the Ottomans losing all their European possessions west of the Midia-Enos line, not far from Istanbul. Bulgaria gained possession of most of Thrace, including Adrianople and the Aegean port of Dedeagach (today Alexandroupoli). Bulgaria also gained a slice of Macedonia, north and east of Thessaloniki, but only some small areas along her western borders.

==== Second Balkan War ====
Bulgaria sustained the heaviest casualties of any of the allies, and on this basis felt entitled to the largest share of the spoils. The Serbs, in particular, did not see things this way and refused to vacate any of the territories they had seized in northern Macedonia (that is, the territory roughly corresponding to the modern Republic of North Macedonia), stating that the Bulgarian army had failed to accomplish its pre-war goals at Adrianople (i.e., failing to capture it without Serbian help) and that the pre-war agreements on the division of Macedonia had to be revised. Some circles in Bulgaria inclined toward going to war with Serbia and Greece on this issue. In June 1913 Serbia and Greece formed a new alliance, against Bulgaria. The Serbian Prime Minister, Nikola Pasic, told Greece it could have Thrace if Greece helped Serbia keep Bulgaria out of the Serbian part of Macedonia, and the Greek Prime Minister Eleftherios Venizelos agreed. Seeing this as a violation of the pre-war agreements, and discreetly encouraged by Germany and Austria-Hungary, Tsar Ferdinand declared war on Serbia and Greece and the Bulgarian army attacked on June 29. The Serbian and the Greek forces were initially on the retreat on the western border, but they soon took the upper hand and forced Bulgaria into retreat. The fighting was very harsh, with many casualties, especially during the key Battle of Bregalnica. Soon Romania entered the war and attacked Bulgaria from the north. The Ottoman Empire also attacked from the southeast. The war was now lost for Bulgaria, which had to abandon most of her claims of Macedonia to Serbia and Greece, while the revived Ottomans retook Adrianople. Romania took possession of southern Dobruja.

=== World War I ===
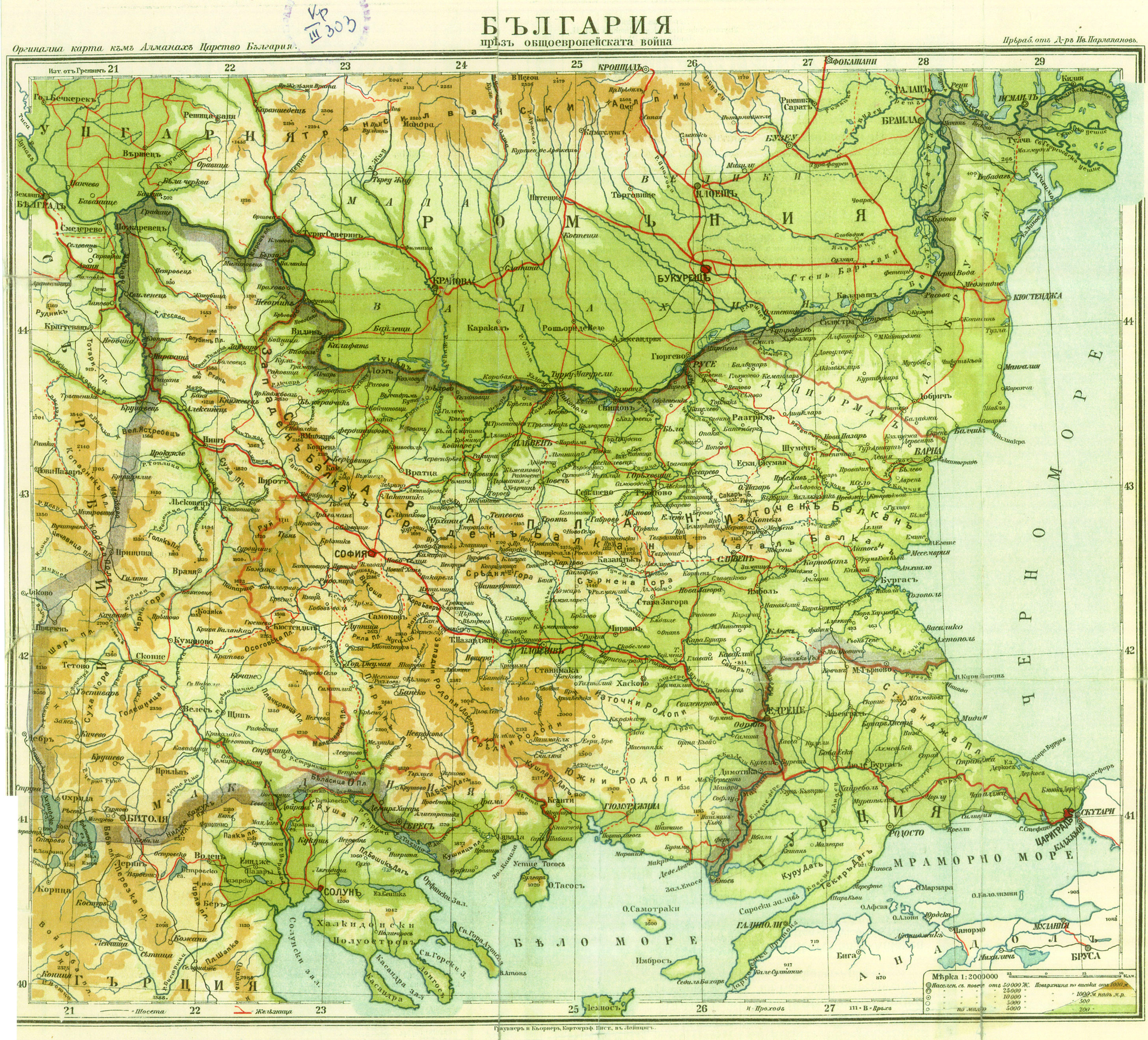
The largest territorial extent of the Kingdom of Bulgaria during World War I (including occupied territories)

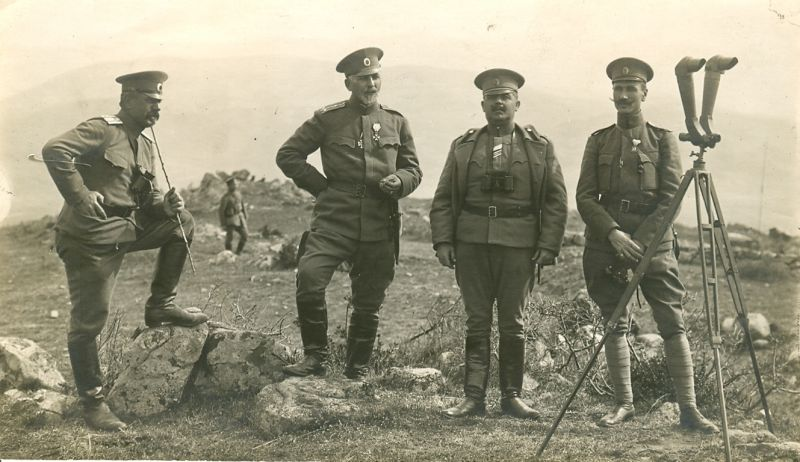
Bulgarian officers on the Macedonian front

In the aftermath of the Balkan Wars, Bulgarian opinion turned against Russia and the Western powers, whom Bulgarians felt had done nothing to assist them. Bulgaria, Romania, and Greece initially remained neutral, observing the course of the war before deciding where their sympathies lay.

Under the government of Vasil Radoslavov, Bulgaria aligned itself with Germany and Austria-Hungary, despite this entailing becoming an ally of the Ottomans, Bulgaria's traditional adversary. However, Bulgaria had relinquished its claims against the Ottomans, while Serbia, Greece, and Romania (allies of the UK and France) held territories perceived as Bulgarian by Bulgaria. Recuperating from the Balkan Wars, Bulgaria remained neutral during the first year of World War I. When Germany pledged to restore the boundaries of the Treaty of San Stefano, Bulgaria, boasting the largest army in the Balkans, declared war on Serbia in October 1915. Subsequently, the UK, France, Italy, and Russia declared war on Bulgaria.

Bulgaria, allied with Germany, Austria-Hungary, and the Ottomans, achieved military victories against Serbia and Romania. They captured much of Macedonia (including Skopje in October), advanced into Greek Macedonia, and seized Dobruja from the Romanians in September 1916. However, the war quickly became unpopular among the majority of Bulgarians, who endured severe economic hardship and resented fighting against their fellow Orthodox Christians while allied with the Muslim Ottomans. Aleksandar Stamboliyski, leader of the Agrarian Party, was imprisoned for his opposition to the war. The Russian Revolution of February 1917 significantly impacted Bulgaria, spreading antiwar and anti-monarchist sentiments among troops and in cities. In June, Radoslavov's government resigned, mutinies erupted in the army, Stamboliyski was released, and a republic was proclaimed.

Territorial changes after the Treaty of Neuilly-sur-Seine.

In September 1918, the French, Serbs, British, Italians, and Greeks broke through on the Macedonian front, compelling Tsar Ferdinand to seek peace. Stamboliyski advocated for democratic reforms rather than a revolution. To preempt the revolutionaries, he persuaded Ferdinand to abdicate in favor of his son, Boris III. The revolutionaries were suppressed, and the army was disbanded. Under the Treaty of Neuilly-sur-Seine (November 1919), Bulgaria lost its Aegean coastline (Western Thrace) to Greece, parts of its Macedonian territory and the Western Outlands to the new Kingdom of Yugoslavia, and Southern Dobruja was returned to the Kingdom of Romania. The country was required to reduce its army to no more than 20,000 men and pay reparations exceeding $100 million. Bulgarians generally refer to the treaty's outcomes as the "Second National Catastrophe." In elections held in March 1920, the Agrarians secured a substantial majority, and Stamboliyski formed Bulgaria's first genuinely democratic government.

=== Interwar period ===
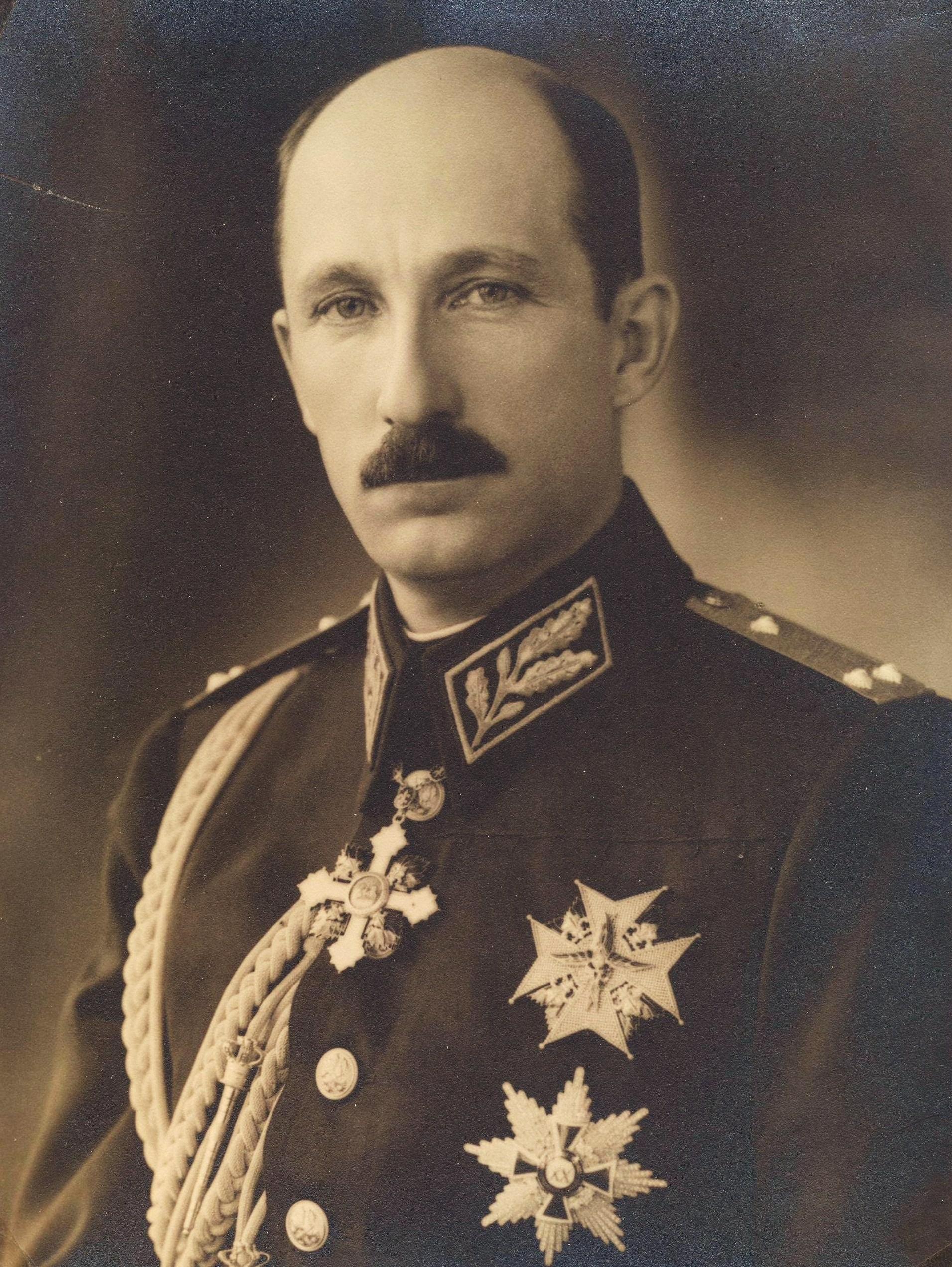
Boris III of Bulgaria, who reigned from 1918 to 1943

After World War I, Bulgaria had already lost a significant amount of territory, including its coast to the Aegean Sea with Dede Agach (Alexandroupoli), which was crucial for the Bulgarian economy, as well as the Western Outlands. The 1879 constitution did not clearly delineate the powers of the king and Parliament, a common issue in constitutional monarchies. While the framers of the 1879 constitution intended to vest most of the power in Parliament, a sufficiently cunning monarch could still potentially seize control of the government machinery. This proved to be the case with Tsar Ferdinand, who, however, was compelled to abdicate after successive defeats in the Balkan Wars and World War I. His son, Boris, then ascended to the throne, but the young king could not replicate the political influence his father had amassed over three decades of intrigue. Furthermore, Boris did not command the same level of moral authority that his father had established.

==== Stamboliyski's cabinet ====
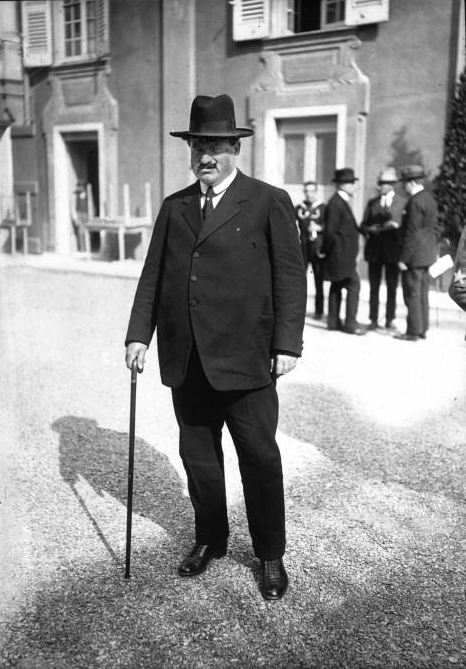
Aleksandar Stamboliyski

Parliament came to dominate after Boris appointed Aleksandar Stamboliyski as prime minister. Stamboliyski's Agrarian Party soon gained control of Parliament, holding over half of the seats. The remaining seats were held by the Bulgarian Communist Party, the country's second-largest political party and the only other significant one (several minor parties had no representation in Parliament or real significance). The Agrarian Party primarily represented disgruntled peasants, particularly those dissatisfied with the government in Sofia during Ferdinand's corrupt reign, which exploited and stole from the peasantry. While most lower-class Bulgarians supported Macedonia's annexation, they were dismayed by the heavy casualties suffered in two unsuccessful wars to reclaim it. Stamboliyski himself spent the war years in jail for vehemently criticizing these wars. On the other hand, the Bulgarian Communist Party drew support mainly from the intelligentsia and urban professionals, with its primary base consisting of the poorest peasants and minorities. In contrast, the Agrarian Party represented wealthier peasants. In this climate, Stamboliyski swiftly enacted a 1920 land reform aimed at breaking up state properties, church lands, and holdings of wealthy peasants. Predictably, this garnered widespread support and pushed the Bulgarian Communist Party into an alliance with the Agrarian Party to gain parliamentary representation.

Stamboliyski faced significant social problems in what was still a poor country, inhabited mostly by peasant smallholders. Bulgaria was burdened with substantial war reparations to Yugoslavia and Romania and had to contend with the issue of refugees, as pro-Bulgarian Macedonians were forced to leave Yugoslav Macedonia. Nevertheless, Stamboliyski was able to push through many social reforms, despite strong opposition from the Tsar, landlords, and the officers of the significantly reduced but still influential army. Another formidable adversary was the Internal Macedonian Revolutionary Organization (VMRO), which advocated for war to regain independence for Macedonia. Faced with this array of enemies, Stamboliyski allied himself with the Bulgarian Communist Party and established relations with the Soviet Union.

Stamboliyski immediately embarked on drastic economic reforms. He abolished the mercantile monopoly on grain and replaced it with a state syndicate, dismantled large urban and rural estates and sold the surplus to the poor, introduced compulsory labor laws to alleviate post-war unemployment, implemented a progressive income tax, and made secondary education mandatory. All aspects of this radical reform policy were designed to eliminate "noxious" classes such as lawyers, usurers, and merchants, distribute wealth and responsibilities more equitably across society, and improve the living standards of landless and poor peasants. In foreign policy, Stamboliyski officially renounced Bulgaria's territorial claims, which he associated with a standing army, monarchy, and large government expenditures—phenomena that peasants considered outdated. With no major power available to protect Bulgarian interests in the Balkans post-war, the traditional foreign policy approach was abandoned in favor of reconciliation with all European powers, the new government of Kemal Ataturk in Turkey, membership in the League of Nations, and friendship with the new Kingdom of Serbs, Croats, and Slovenes (later the Kingdom of Yugoslavia). Bulgaria's support for Atatürk's Turkish Republic in 1920 significantly improved relations with Turkey. Reconciling with Yugoslavia was crucial for Stamboliyski's vision of establishing a multiethnic Balkan Peasants' Federation. Better relations with Yugoslavia depended on suppressing the powerful Macedonian extremist movement. Therefore, in 1921, Stamboliyski initiated a two-year period of severe repression against the IMRO; by 1923, Bulgaria and Yugoslavia agreed at the Nis Convention to collaborate in combating extremism.

Stamboliyski was a staunch anti-communist and aimed to create an international movement to counter Marxism. This effort was known as his "Green International," in opposition to the communist "Red International." He traveled to Eastern European capitals promoting his vision of a peasant alliance. However, trouble arose when he attempted to spread this movement into Yugoslavia, a country with conditions very similar to Bulgaria—little industry and a significant communist presence. Stamboliyski was well-liked in Belgrade due to his support for a peaceful resolution to the Macedonia issue. He also advocated for uniting all Slavic-speaking nations in Eastern Europe into a large Yugoslav confederation. However, he encountered difficulties due to the militant faction of IMRO back home. Many Macedonian leaders had relocated to Sofia after the failed 1903 revolt against the Ottoman Empire, and they were now joined by others fleeing the Yugoslav government, which officially claimed Macedonians as ethnic Serbs. Bulgaria, having been compelled to reduce its armed forces after World War I, saw IMRO leaders gain control over much of the border area with Yugoslavia.

Under the leadership of a large Macedonian group in Sofia, the remaining strong nationalist elements in Bulgaria found the new pacifist policy alarming. The urban working class, which did not benefit from the agrarian reforms, gravitated towards the Communists or the Socialist Workers. Inflation and industrial exploitation continued unabated. Many of Stamboliyski's subordinates exacerbated social tensions by adopting rigid positions in favor of peasant rights. The National Alliance, a confederation that had been dormant since the war, reorganized the Bulgarian right. In 1922, its leaders were imprisoned by Stamboliyski's Orange Guard, temporarily stifling its activities. Meanwhile, in late 1922 and early 1923, Macedonian nationalists seized Kyustendil on the Yugoslav border. They assaulted government officials in protest against the reconciliation with Yugoslavia and the Kingdom of Greece. Stamboliyski responded with mass arrests, an intensified campaign against IMRO terrorism, a purge of his own fractured and notoriously corrupt party, and called for new parliamentary elections. These measures united diverse opponents of the Agrarians—including IMRO, the National Alliance, army factions, and social democrats—into a coalition led by Aleksandar Tsankov. The Communists remained outside this coalition. Bulgaria's Western creditors, disenchanted with a government that had rejected their reparations policy, refrained from intervening. In June 1923, IMRO agents brutally assassinated Stamboliyski, paving the way for the conspirators to seize control of the entire country. Despite scattered and ineffective peasant resistance, they consolidated their grip on power.

==== 1923 Bulgarian coup d'etat, Tsankov and Lyapchev's cabinets ====
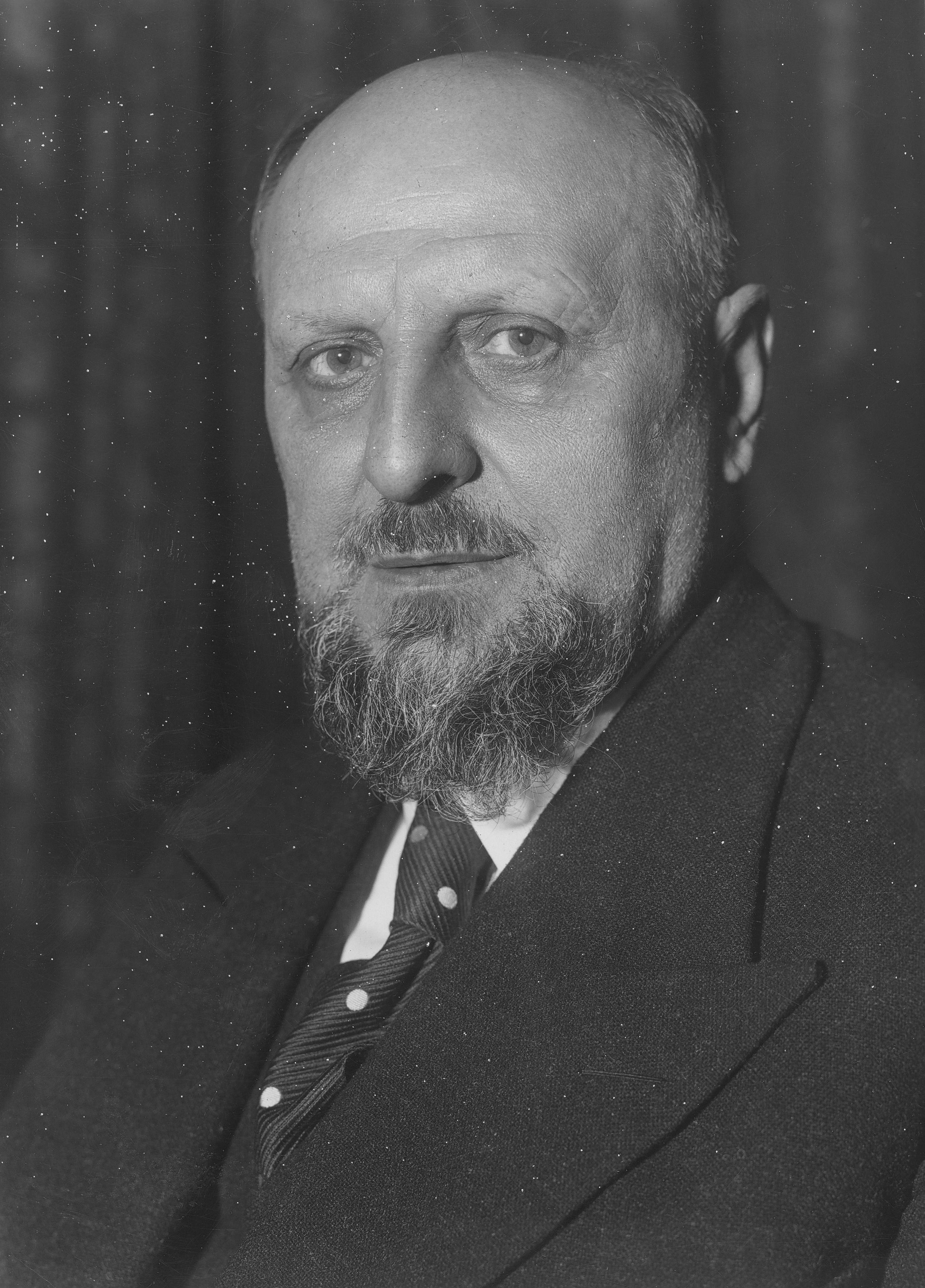
Aleksandar Tsankov

In March 1923 Stamboliyski signed an agreement with Yugoslavia recognizing the new border and agreeing to suppress IMRO. This triggered a nationalist reaction, and on 9 June there was a coup organized by the armed forces under General Ivan Valkov's Military Union with support from the Tsar and other right-wing elements of the Tsardom after the AP controlled 87% of Parliament in the elections that year. The Bulgarian government could only muster a handful of troops to resist and even worse was a peasant mob with no guns rallied by Stamboliyski. Despite this, the streets of Sofia erupted in chaos and the hapless prime minister was lynched in addition to attacks on unarmed peasants.

The whole affair seriously tar brushed Bulgaria's international image. A right-wing government under Aleksandar Tsankov took power, backed by the Tsar, the army, and the VMRO.

The September Uprising began in 1923, after the 9 June coup d'état, when Alexander Stamboliyski was planning to capture Pazardzhik with his sympathizers to restore his power, which was quickly disrupted by the Bulgarian Army. He was then captured and relocated to Slavovitsa, his birthplace, where he was tortured and killed by IMRO agents. Tsankov's government arrested over 2000 alleged communists in which uprisings began. Vasil Kolarov and Georgi Dimitrov, who were the main leaders of the uprisings, chose Montana as the centre. Many uprisings began in the Northwestern parts of Bulgaria, which were quickly overpowered by the army.

The Communist leader Georgi Dimitrov fled to the Soviet Union. There was savage repression in 1925 following the second of two failed attempts on the Tsar's life in the bomb attack on Sofia Cathedral (the first attempt took place in the mountain pass of Arabakonak). But in 1926, Boris persuaded Tsankov to resign in favour of a more moderate government under Andrey Lyapchev. An amnesty was proclaimed, although the Communists remained banned.

Lyapchev was considered to be more lenient towards the political opposition than Tsankov. The Communists re-emerged in 1927 under the guide of the political party Bulgarian Workers' Party. An independent workers' trade union became the centre of workers' political activity. Under the Macedonian prime minister, the IMRO also had much more freedom. This meant that political assassinations and acts of terrorism could continue unabated. IMRO raids into Yugoslavia ended Bulgaria's rapprochement with that country. The Macedonians demanded preferential economic treatment under Liapchev. the late 1920s brought relative political stability to Bulgaria compared with the previous years. Lyapchev was the leader of a conservative majority in the Sabranie. The press was relatively free, and the institutions of education and the judiciary were functioning independently. Output in industry and agriculture was finally above pre-war levels, and foreign investment was on the rise. But even after being substantially reduced, Bulgaria's reparations payments in 1928 amounted to 20 per cent of its budget, and the return to the Gold standard in that year weakened the economy a year before the Great Depression began. In foreign policy, Lyapchev tried unsuccessfully to improve the terms of British and French reparations from the First World War and to bring Bulgaria out of its post-war diplomatic isolation. The country had already improved its international image through its enthusiastic participation in the League of Nations. In 1926, Bulgaria returned the favour by forcing Greek invading troops to leave southern Bulgaria during the Incident at Petrich. The Macedonian independence movement split over the ultimate goal of its activities in the late 1920s. The supremacist faction sought the incorporation of all Macedonian territory into Bulgaria. The federalist faction (including the IMRO) sought an autonomous Macedonia that could join Bulgaria or Yugoslavia in a protective alliance in the event of a war.

==== 1934 Bulgarian coup d'etat and the beginning of authoritarian rule ====
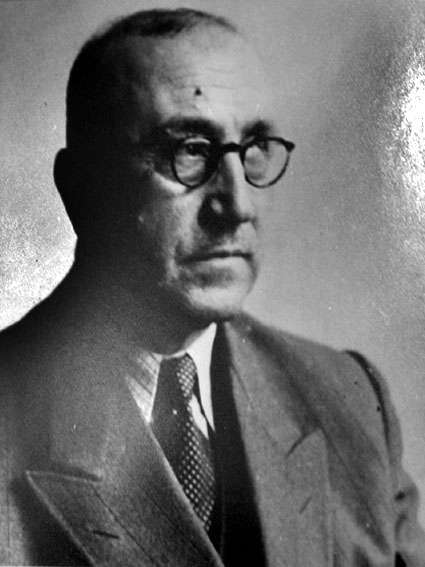
Kimon Georgiev

The first daily radio broadcasts appeared in 1930. There were many radio broadcasters such as Radio Sofia (now Radio Bulgaria).

The Agrarians reorganized and won elections in 1931 under the leadership of Nikola Mushanov.

Just when political stability had been restored, the full effects of the Great Depression hit Bulgaria, and social tensions rose again. In May 1934 there was another coup by the military organization Zveno, an authoritarian regime headed by Colonel Kimon Georgiev was established. They dissolved all parties and trade unions and suppressed the IMRO. Their government introduced a corporatist economy, similar to that of Benito Mussolini's Italy. After participating in the Bulgarian coup d'état of 1934, Zveno supporters declared their intention to immediately form an alliance with France and to seek the unification of Bulgaria into an Integral Yugoslavia.

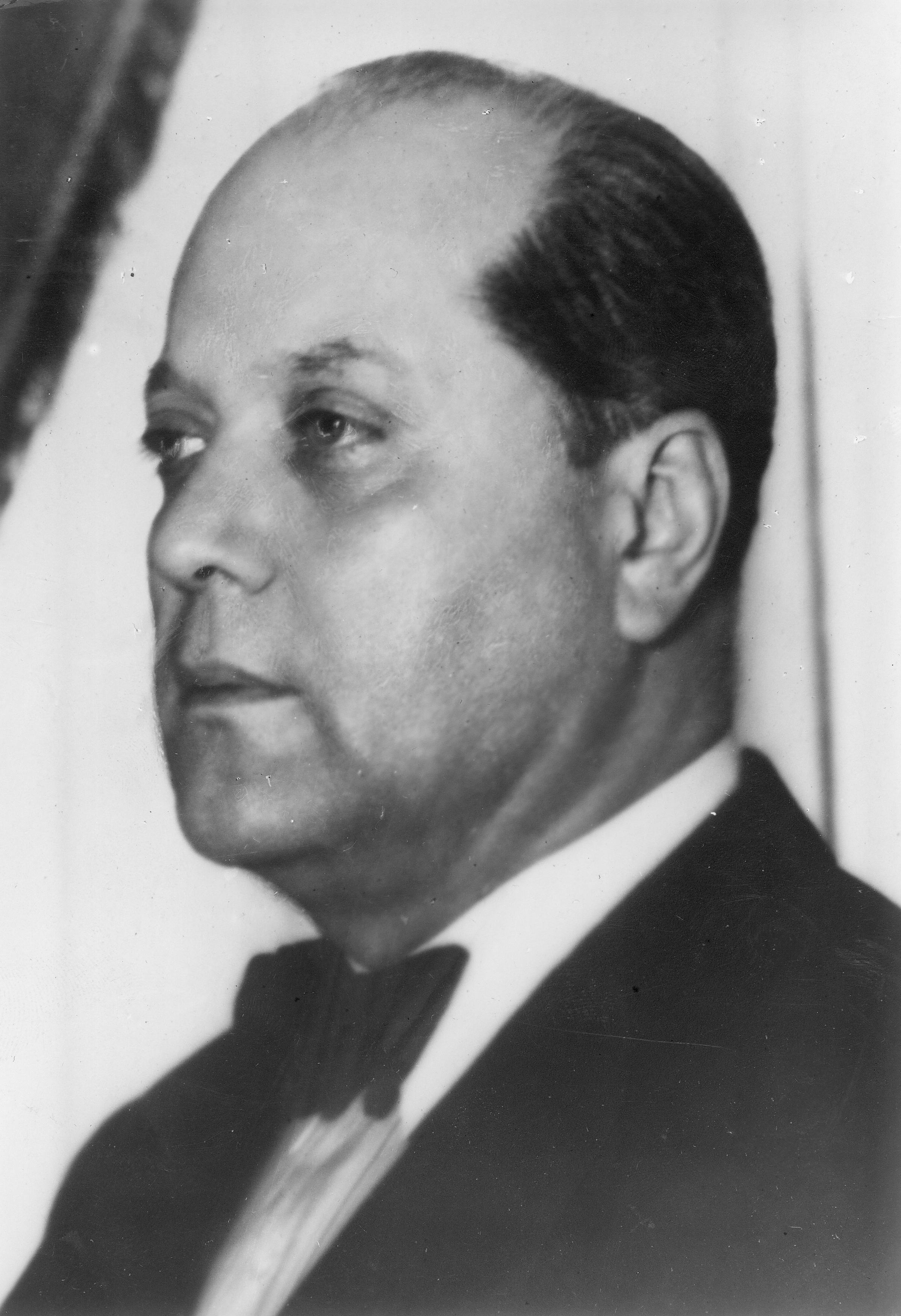
Georgi Kyoseivanov

In April 1935 Boris III staged a counter-coup with the help of monarchist Zveno member General Pencho Zlatev and took power himself. The political process was controlled by the Tsar, but a form of parliamentary rule was re-introduced. However, political parties remained banned, and uncharismatic prime ministers were appointed by the monarch. He didn't restore the traditional political supremacy of the Sabranie and write a new constitution. In 1936 a broad coalition, the People's Constitutional Bloc, brought together nearly all leftist and centrist factions in a nominal opposition that had the blessing of the tsar. Boris delayed holding a national election until 1938. At that time, only individual candidates were allowed in a carefully controlled election procedure that excluded party candidate lists. Boris claimed that domination of the new subranie by pro-government representatives justified his non-party system, although the People's Constitutional Bloc seated over sixty delegates. Elections in the next two years were strictly limited in order to maintain Boris's control over his parliament.

With the rise of the "King's government" in 1935, Bulgaria entered an era of prosperity and astounding growth, which deservedly qualifies it as the Golden Age of the Third Bulgarian Kingdom. It lasted nearly five years, governed by prime minister Georgi Kyoseivanov. Kyoseivanov's Premiership oversaw the trials of the instigators of the 1934 military coup and also concluded pacts with Yugoslavia and Greece as Nazi Germany undertook a policy of economic isolation of the Balkans. His government also oversaw a policy of rearmament after a treaty concluded with Ioannis Metaxas overturned the military clauses of the Treaty of Neuilly-sur-Seine and the Treaty of Lausanne. Although the signing of the Salonika Agreement of 1938 restored good relations with Yugoslavia and Greece, the territorial issue continued to simmer.

=== World War II ===
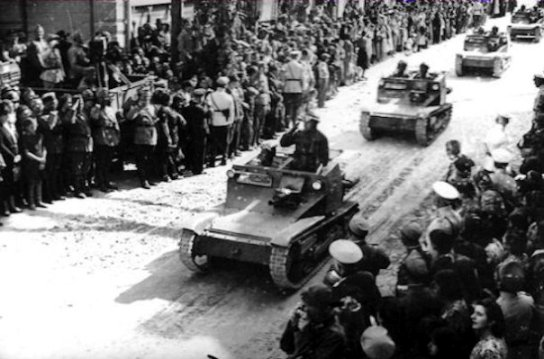
Bulgarian troops entering Dobrich after the Treaty of Craiova

The government of the Kingdom of Bulgaria under Prime Minister Georgi Kyoseivanov declared a position of neutrality upon the outbreak of World War II. Bulgaria was determined to observe it until the end of the war, but it hoped for bloodless territorial gains to recover the territories lost in the Second Balkan War and World War I, as well as gain other lands with a significant Bulgarian population occupied by neighboring countries. However, it was clear that the central geopolitical position of Bulgaria in the Balkans would inevitably lead to strong external pressure from both World War II factions. On 15 February 1940, following the resignation of Georgi Kyoseivanov, a pro-German Bogdan Filov was appointed Prime Minister of the Kingdom of Bulgaria. On 7 September 1940 Bulgaria succeeded in negotiating the recovery of Southern Dobruja in the Axis-sponsored Treaty of Craiova. Bulgaria also had a non-aggression pact with Turkey.

On 1 March 1941 Bulgaria formally signed the Tripartite Pact, becoming an ally of Nazi Germany, the Empire of Japan, and the Kingdom of Italy. German troops entered the country in preparation for the German invasions of the Kingdom of Greece and the Kingdom of Yugoslavia. When Yugoslavia and Greece were defeated, Bulgaria was allowed to occupy all of Greek Thrace and most of Macedonia. Bulgaria declared war on Britain and the United States but resisted German pressure to declare war on the Soviet Union, fearful of pro-Russian sentiment in the country.

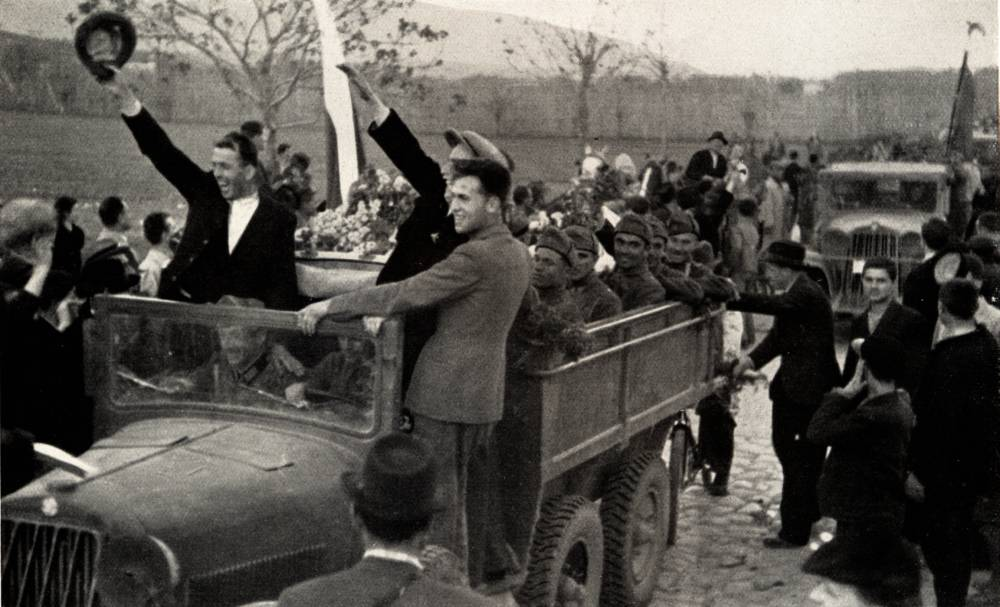
Bulgarian troops entering Vardar Macedonia in southern Yugoslavia, April 1941

In August 1943 Tsar Boris died suddenly after returning from Germany from heart failure, but also rumoured to be poisoned. He was later succeeded by his six-year-old son Simeon II. Power was held by a council of regents headed by the young Tsar's uncle, Prince Kiril, Bogdan Filov and Nikola Mihov. The new prime minister, Dobri Bozhilov, was in most respects a German puppet. Resistance to the Germans and the Bulgarian regime was widespread by 1943, coordinated mainly by the communists. Together with the Agrarians, now led by Nikola Petkov, the Social Democrats, and even many army officers they founded the Fatherland Front. Partisans operated in the mountainous west and south. By 1944 it was obvious that Germany was losing the war and the regime began to look for a way out. On 1 June 1944 Filov sacked Bozhilov, in the hope of placating internal opposition and the Allies. Filov had reluctantly decided the alliance with Germany should end. His successor Ivan Bagryanov tried to arrange negotiations with the western Allies.

Meanwhile, the capital Sofia was bombed by Allied aircraft in 1941 until 1944. But it was the Red Army which was rapidly advancing towards Bulgaria. In August 1944 Bulgaria unilaterally announced its withdrawal from the war and asked the German troops to leave: Bulgarian troops were hastily withdrawn from Greece and Yugoslavia. In September, the Soviets crossed the northern border. The government, desperate to avoid a Soviet occupation, declared war on Germany, but the Soviets could not be put off, and on September 8, they declared war on Bulgaria – which thus found itself for a few days at war with both Germany and the Soviet Union. The Soviet Union occupied the north-eastern part of Bulgaria along with the key port cities of Varna and Burgas by the next day. By order of the government, the Bulgarian Army offered no resistance. On September 16, the Red Army entered Sofia. During the same day, a pro-Axis government-in-exile was established in Vienna under Aleksandar Tsankov and while it was able to muster a 600-strong Bulgarian SS regiment of Bulgarian anti-communist volunteers already in Germany under a German commander, they had little success.

=== Holocaust ===
The Holocaust in Bulgaria was the persecution of Jews between 1941 and 1944 in the Kingdom of Bulgaria and their deportation and annihilation in the Bulgarian-occupied regions of Yugoslavia and Greece during World War II, arranged by the Nazi Germany-allied government of Tsar Boris III and prime minister Bogdan Filov. The persecution began in 1941 with the passing of anti-Jewish legislation and culminated in March 1943 with the arrest and deportation of almost all – 11,343 – of the Jews living in Bulgarian-occupied regions of Northern Greece, Yugoslav Macedonia and Pirot. These were deported by the Bulgarian authorities and sent to extermination camps in German-occupied Poland.

The deportation of the 48,000 Jews from Bulgaria proper was subsequently initiated but halted following widespread protests. Upon becoming aware of the impending plans members of parliament led by Dimitar Peshev pressured the interior minister to revoke the initial deportation order, while public protests and interventions by prominent figures, notably Bulgarian Orthodox Church bishops Stefan of Sofia and Kiril of Plovdiv, persuaded the Tsar first to stop the deportation temporarily in March 1943, and two months later to postpone it indefinitely. The Jews whose deportation from Bulgaria was halted, including all Sofia's 25,743 Jews, were instead internally deported to the countryside and had their property confiscated, and Jewish males between the ages of 20 and 46 were conscripted into the Labour Corps until September 1944. The events that prevented the deportation to extermination camps of about 48,000 Jews in spring 1943 are termed the "Rescue of the Bulgarian Jews". The survival rate of the Jewish population in Bulgaria as a result was one of the highest in Axis Europe.

=== Communist coup ===
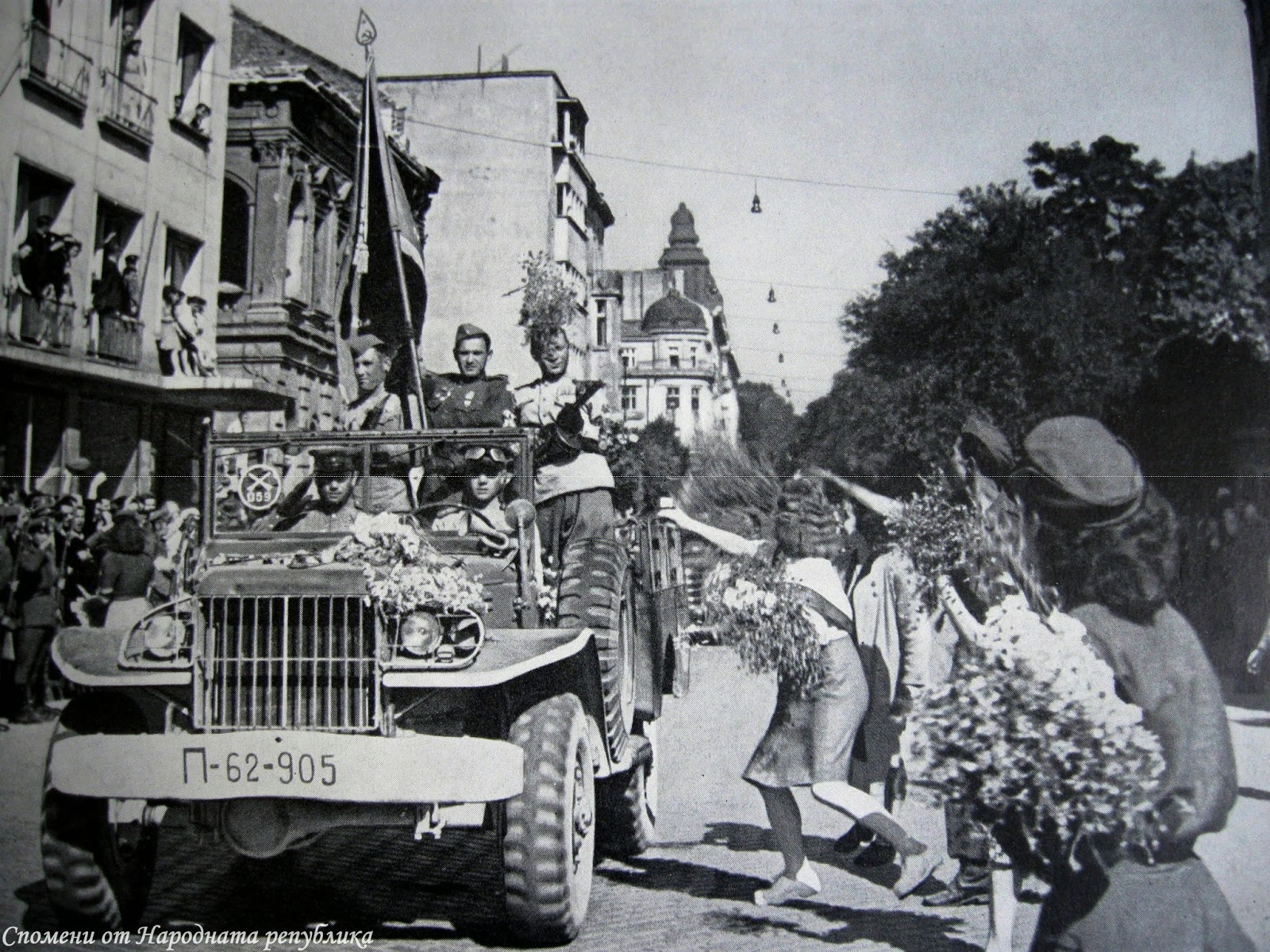
Soviet troops entering Sofia after the coup, September 1944

The Fatherland Front took office in Sofia following a coup d'état, setting up a broad coalition under the former ruler Kimon Georgiev. Under the terms of the peace settlement Bulgaria was allowed to keep Southern Dobruja, but formally renounced all claims to Greek and Yugoslav territory. 150,000 Bulgarians were expelled from Greek Thrace. The Communists deliberately took a minor role in the new government at first, but the Soviet representatives were the real power in the country. A Communist-controlled People's Militia was set up, which harassed and intimidated non-Communist parties.

The new realities of power in Bulgaria were shown when the former regents and hundreds of other officials of the old regime who were arrested on charges of war crimes were executed on 1 February 1945. In September 1946, the monarchy was abolished by plebiscite. This referendum violated the Tarnovo Constitution, which stated that any change in the form of the state could only take place if a Grand National Assembly was convened by the Tsar (in practice, the Tsar acting on the advice of the government). The republic was formally proclaimed a week later, and the young Tsar Simeon was forced into exile. The Communists now openly took power, with Vasil Kolarov becoming president and Dimitrov becoming prime minister. Free elections promised for 1946 were blatantly rigged and were boycotted by the opposition. The Agrarians refused to co-operate with the new regime, and in June 1947 their leader Nikola Petkov was arrested. Despite strong international protests, he was executed in September. This marked the Dimitrov Constitution to be introduced and also an establishment of a Communist regime in Bulgaria.

== Boundaries ==
Subdivisions of Bulgaria

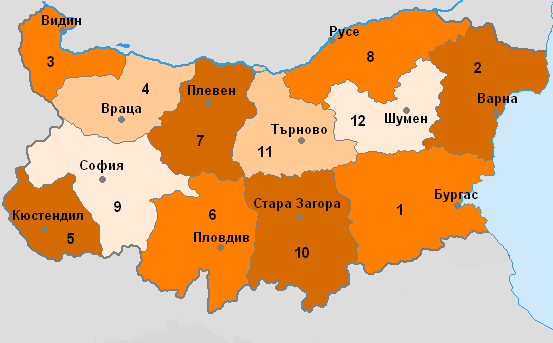
Okrugs from 1901 to 1913.

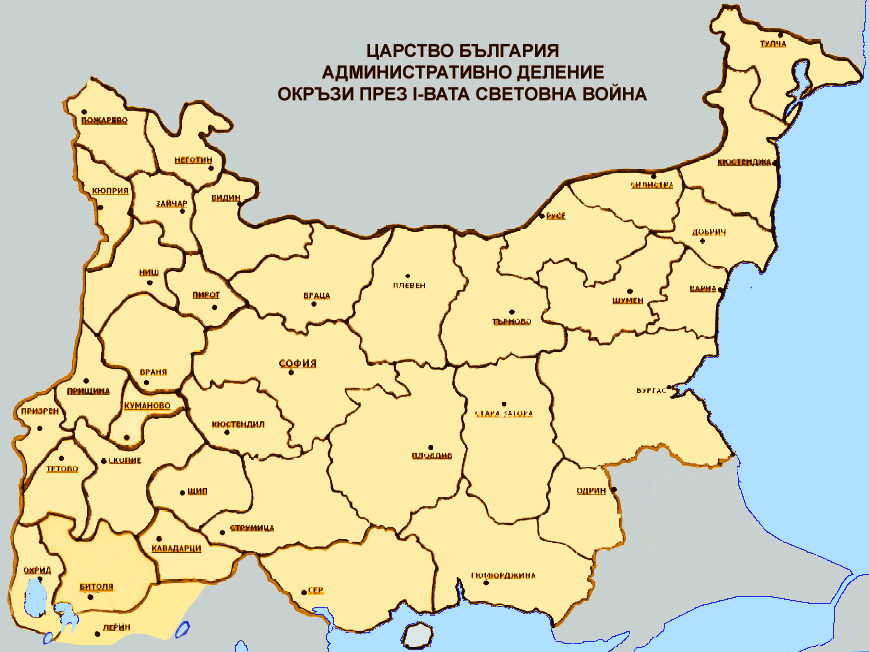
Okrugs from 1915 to 1918

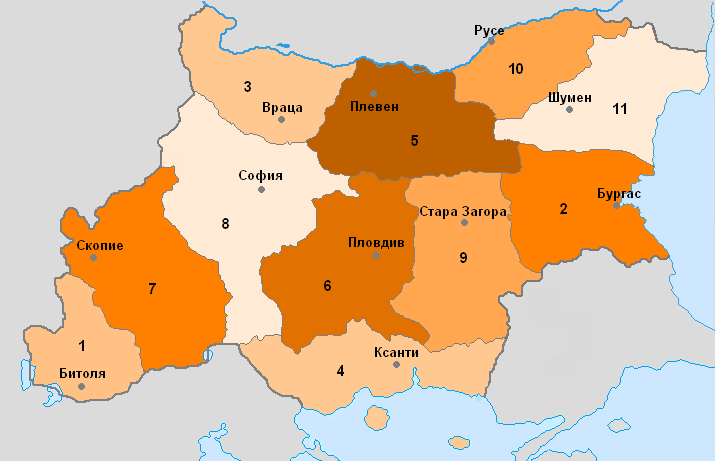
Oblasts from 1941 to 1944

Bulgaria had its fair share of significant changes to its boundaries throughout independence to communism. Before the First Balkan War, Bulgaria didn't have control over the main parts of the Rhodope Mountains, which included settlements such as Smolyan, Kardzhali etc. After the war, Bulgaria gained the most territory in total area, as it included the eastern parts of Macedonia, Greek Thrace and Adrianople. Due to its eagerness in Macedonia, in where they didn't obtain the rest of it, began the Second Balkan War which resulted in a harsh Bulgarian defeat. It had lost all its previous gains from the previous war, and had lost its Southern Dobruja to the Kingdom of Romania. It still kept Western Thrace and the Western Outlands. During World War I, Bulgaria joined in 1915 on the side of the Central Powers and gained a large amount of land from the Kingdom of Serbia, which included Macedonia and the sheer extensiveness around Niš. After losing, Bulgaria lost its Aegean coast, and its earned land in Serbia.

During the Interwar period, no change in boundaries happened, but there was an incident at Petrich, which was the only conflict it fought internationally during this period. After pro-German prime ministers elected into office, Bulgaria entered World War II on the side of the Axis powers. After the Invasion of Yugoslavia and also of Greece, Bulgaria once again obtained a coastline to the Aegean and Macedonia with Pirot. After the Soviet invasion of Bulgaria in 1944, the Bulgarians obtained Southern Dobruja.

== Demographics ==
Since the population was 85% ethnic Bulgarian, there was relatively little social strife aside from the conflict between the haves and have-nots. Most inhabitants of Sofia maintained close ties to the countryside, but this did not prevent a rift between the peasants and urban class (i.e. Sofia versus everyone else), although some were the result of deliberate manipulation by politicians seeking to take advantage of traditional peasant distrust of the "effeminate city slicker". Mostly, however, it was due to a quarrel between the rulers and the ruled. Around 14% of the population were Muslims, mostly Turks (i.e. the remnant of the landowning class), but also a handful of so-called "Pomaks" (ethnic Bulgarians who practiced Islam). The Muslim population was alienated from the dominant Orthodox Christians both due to religious and historical reasons.

== Education ==
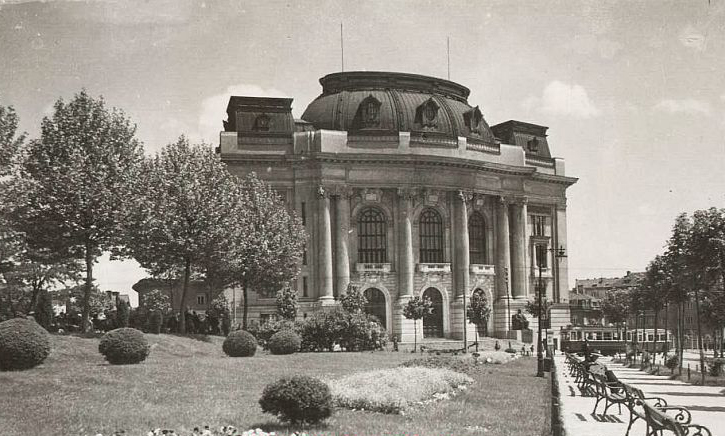
Sofia University in 1935

In 1909, a year after Bulgarian independence, a law was adopted to change the structure of the education system, maintained with different minor changes past several decades. In the post-war years, 1919–1923, there was stagnation in comparative education activities. All conditions of education functioning were extremely worsened. The postwar governments brought about an unstable political and social situation. Third, the main task of the Ministry of Education was restoring the normal functions of schools in this country, laying aside all other activities. The lower secondary school was converted into a junior one by the law, with a three-year course of study and was served to be succeeded by primary schools and basis of secondary schools. Compulsory education became mandatory for children aged 7–14, but only applied to primary school students. High schools were established. Significant changes were made in the education with the law by Stoyan Omarchevski. Basic education institutes were established, courses in high-school were divided into lower and upper courses. After the 1923 coup d'état, education was largely changed, including that the transition from primary to secondary was to be decided by entrance examinations, which was also introduced for graduates of incomplete secondary education. Religion also became a mandatory subject in high school.

In comparison to economics, Bulgaria's educational system was more successful, and less than half the population was illiterate. Eight years of schooling were required and over 80% of children attended. For the few special students who went past elementary school, the high schools were based on the German gymnasium. Competitive examinations were used to judge college applicants, and Bulgaria had several technical and specialized schools in addition to the University of Sofia. Many Bulgarian students also went abroad, primarily to Germany and Austria after educational ties with Russia ended in 1917. Overall, education reached more of the lower classes than anywhere else in Eastern Europe, but on the downside all too many students obtained degrees in the liberal arts and other abstract subjects and could not find work anywhere except in the government bureaucracy. Many of them gravitated towards the Bulgarian Communist Party.

== Economy ==
The Bulgarian state at the turn of the 20th century was rural, agrarian, relatively unindustrialised and economically backward nation, in which the economical development hampered by wars and territorial loses. Around 37.8% of the population of about 4.3 million were rural peasants; in 1910, urban dwellers accounted for 19.1% of the total population, a figure that had remained relatively unchanged since Bulgaria had gained independence from Ottoman rule almost 30 years earlier.

The literacy rate was low: in 1900 it was 58% in the capital Sofia, 40% in all other cities and 15% in rural areas. The agrarian character of Bulgarian society was reflected in Bulgarian industry, which was completely dominated by textile, food and beverage production: in 1911 these sectors accounted for almost 90% of total Bulgarian factory production. Moreover, Bulgarian industry was extremely inefficient: per capita production was only 28.3 leva (the Bulgarian currency unit) compared to 1,128 per capita in the US; even Russian industry proved more efficient at about 150 leva per capita.

Two years after independence, in 1910, the gross national product (GNP-PPP) per capita was $270, last in Europe and the Balkans. Due to the Balkan Wars, the financial cost against the Ottoman Empire alone was 1.3 billion francs. External trade fell drastically in 1913, with exports reduced by 40% and imports by 11%. This led to a soaring trade deficit of over 87 million levs by 1914. Before the war, grain had been a leading Bulgarian export commodity with the most productive area being Dobruja. The state took special care for the development of the region; it built railways to carry grain and other exports to the port of Varna, whose facilities had been developed at great cost. In 1912, it handled more goods than Salonika.

By 1938, the GNP-PPP per capita had risen to $420, putting Bulgaria ahead of Yugoslavia, Romania, Poland, Portugal, and civil war Spain on this measure. Real GDP per capita in 1939, equated to a 2011 dollar value, was $2,649, the third lowest in Europe after Yugoslavia and Romania. By 1939, 73.5% of manufacturing revenue came from agriculture, and 26.5% from industry and construction. Over 82% of the workforce in 1924 was in agriculture, and this percentage remained almost unchanged until 1945. The unstable political situation and internal conflicts caused the Kingdom of Bulgaria to be the poorest, or among the poorest countries in Europe.

=== Sectors ===
While more successful than the rest of Eastern Europe, Bulgarian agriculture still suffered from the handicaps of backward technology and especially rural overpopulation and scattered plots (due to the traditional practice of a peasant dividing his land equally among all surviving sons). And all agricultural exports were harmed by the onset of the Great Depression. Still, the country avoided a large food crisis.

Thousands of peasant workers engaged in agricultural activities became casualties during the wars. The number of available horses, sheep, cattle and livestock was between 20% and 40% lower. The single most damaging event was the loss of Southern Dobruja: it had accounted for 20% of Bulgarian grain production before the wars and contained the largest and most developed Bulgarian farming communities. This, combined with bad weather, held the harvest of all crops to 79% of the pre-war level in 1914. On the other hand, an underdeveloped economy meant that Bulgaria had little trouble with debt and inflation. Just under half of the industry was owned by foreign companies in contrast to the nearly 80% of Romanian industry.

Agricultural productivity was very low. Plots were small and almost exclusively under 20 hectares (50 acres), but they were worked intensively and even the tiniest 2-hectare (5-acre) farms often produced crops for market sale. As elsewhere in Eastern Europe, Bulgarian peasants traditionally grew grains for their landowners. After the war, they could not be effectively marketed due to competition from the United States and Western Europe. However, they were able to switch with little difficulty to garden crops and tobacco in contrast to other countries where the peasantry suffered harder due to continued reliance on maize and wheat. By the end of the 1930s, Bulgaria was producing on average twice as much per hectare as developed European countries, including those with worse climatic or soil conditions than Bulgaria.

Between 1934 and 1945, the average area of arable land fell from 0.5 to 0.4 hectares per farm. By 1945 there were 1.2 million farms in the country, almost all of them small and unable to support themselves. Only large farms increased in area over the same period, but they held only 2% of the arable land. The fragmentation of land was due to family inheritance patterns and the need to provide land for the growing rural population. In 1930, nearly 50% of the agricultural labor force was unemployed, and winter employment dropped to 30%. Deflation and increased taxes to stop foreign debt caused the total income of the rural population to drop down half of it between 1929 and 1933.

The industrial sector is weak and does not play a significant role in the economy. Between 1895 and 1928 a number of measures were taken to stimulate industry, such as duty-free imports of machinery, tax exemptions and low freight rates. In the period between World War I and the Great Depression, especially between 1926 and 1929, industrial output doubled. The increase was mainly in textiles, pottery, and electricity; almost all other industries, including milling and food processing, leather, woodworking and metalworking were weakened.

In the 1930s, many of the incentive measures were withdrawn, and the establishment of new enterprises was virtually prohibited. Existing ones continued to be uncompetitive. By 1941, there were 3,467 private, 130 state-owned, and 275 cooperative enterprises in the kingdom, with an average of 26 workers. In that year, 41.3% of industry consisted of small-scale manufacturing and handicrafts, 54.6% of larger-scale manufacturing, and 4.1% represented construction activities. Internationally, Bulgaria lagged behind the leading European industrial countries.

== See also ==
- History of Bulgaria
- History of Bulgaria (1878–1946)
- Invasion of Serbia by Bulgaria during the First World War

== Bibliography ==
- Khristo Angelov Khristov. Bulgaria, 1300 years. Sofia, Bulgaria: Sofia Press, 1980. pp. 192.
- E. Curtis, Glenn (1993). Bulgaria: A Country Study (PDF). Federal Research Division. ISBN 0844407518.
- Rangelova, Rossitsa (June 2000). Bulgaria's National Income and Economic Growth, 1913–1945 (PDF). Review of Income and Wealth. International Association for Research in Income and Wealth.
- Tooze, Adam; Ivanov, Martin (February 2011). "Disciplining the 'black sheep of the Balkans': financial supervision and sovereignty in Bulgaria, 1902–38". The Economic History Review. 64 (1). Wiley: 30–51. doi:10.1111/j.1468-0289.2010.00544.x. JSTOR 27919480. S2CID 153603504.
- Rakoske, Jesse (2012). War and Democratization – A Case Study: The Bulgarian experience of World War I (PDF).
- Lampe, John (1986). The Bulgarian economy in the twentieth century. Routledge. ISBN 978-0709916444.
