= Nikola Zhivkov =

Bulgarian educator

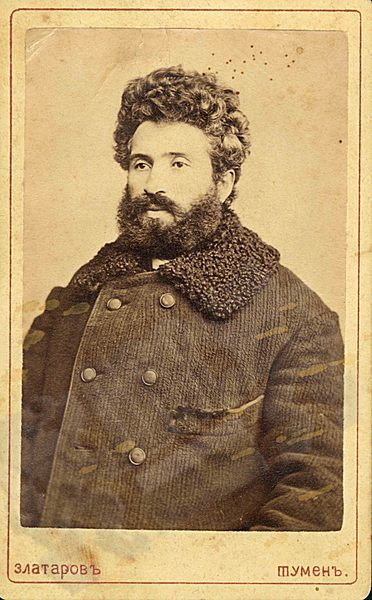
Nikola Zhivkov

Nikola Zhivkov (Bulgarian: Никола Живков, Nikola Živkov; 1847 – 28 August 1901) was a Bulgarian educator, who lived his early life in the Ottoman Empire before the start of Bulgarian independence.

== Life ==
He founded the first kindergarten in Bulgaria and wrote the lyrics of Shumi Maritsa, national anthem of the country from 1886 until 1944. He was the brother of educator and women's rights activist Vela Blagoeva and politician Georgi Zhivkov.
