= Anthem of His Majesty the Tsar =

Bulgarian royal anthem

Himn na Negovo Veličestvo Carja
English: Anthem of His Majesty the Tsar
- Химн на Негово Величество Царя
- Royal anthem of Kingdom of Bulgaria
- Also known as: „Боже, Царя ни пази“
- Lyrics: Georgi Agura
- Music: Emil von Sauer
- Adopted: 1908
- Relinquished: 1946
- Preceded by: God Save the Tsar

Audio sample
- Anthem of His Majesty the Tsar: file; help

The "Anthem of His Majesty the Tsar", (Note: Bulgarian: Химн на Негово Величество Царя, romanized: Himn na Negovo Veličestvo Carja, IPA: [ximn na ˈnɛɡovo vɛˈlitʃɛstvo tsɐrˈja]) also known as "God Save the Tsar", (Note: Bulgarian: Боже, Царя ни пази, romanized: Bože, Carja ni pazi, IPA: [ˈbɔʒɛ tsɐrˈja ni ˈpazi]) was the royal anthem of the Kingdom of Bulgaria from 1908 to 1944. The original music was written by Emil von Sauer. After 1925 the composition by Emanuil Manolov was adopted, and the lyrics were written by Major General Georgi Agura. During this period, the national anthem of the Kingdom of Bulgaria was "Shumi Maritsa" and the "Anthem of His Majesty the Tsar" was played immediately after it on every solemn occasion in the Tsar's presence.

== Lyrics ==
Bulgarian original

Всемогѫщий правий Боже,
молимъ Царьтъ ни пази!
Дай му сили, за да може
зли поврати да срази!

За погромъ на враговетѣ
и за славни бѫднини,
Боже, Царю на Царетѣ,
дай на Царьтъ свѣтли дни!

А на българското племе
ума, Боже, просвѣти,
съ любовь да се обеме
и задружно процъфти.

Чрѣзъ съгласие да може
силна воля да развий,
чрѣзъ напрѣдъкъ дай му, Боже,
славно име да добий!

Modern orthography

Всемогъщий правий Боже,
Молим Царя ни пази,
Дай му сила, за да може
Зли поврати да срази.

За погром на враговете
И за славни бъднини,
Боже, царю на царете
Дай на Царя светли дни.

А на българското племе
Ума Боже просвети,
Със любов да се обеме
И задружно процъфти.

Чрез съгласие да може
Сила, воля да развий,
Чрез напредък дай му, Боже,
Славно име да добий!

Roman orthography

Vsemogǎštij pravij Bože,
Molim Carja ni pazi,
Daj mu sila, za da može
Zli povrati da srazi.

Za pogrom na vragovete
I za slavni bǎdnini,
Bože, carju na carete
Daj na Carja svetli dni.

A na bǎlgarskoto pleme
Uma Bože prosveti,
Sǎs ljubov da se obeme
I zadružno procǎfti.

Črez sǎglasie da može
Sila, volja da razvij,
Črez napredǎk daj mu, Bože,
Slavno ime da dobij!

English translation

Almighty, righteous God,
We pray that the Tsar will protect us,
Give him strenghth so that he can suppress evil turns.

For the defeat of enemies
And for glorious futures,
God, Tsar of Tsars,
Give the Tsar bright days.

And enlighten the mind
Of the Bulgarian tribe,
God, so that it may grow with love
And flourish together.

Through agreement, that I may
Develop a strong will,
Through progress, grant him,
A glorious name!
