= Almerinda Farias Gama =

Brazilian lawyer and trade unionist

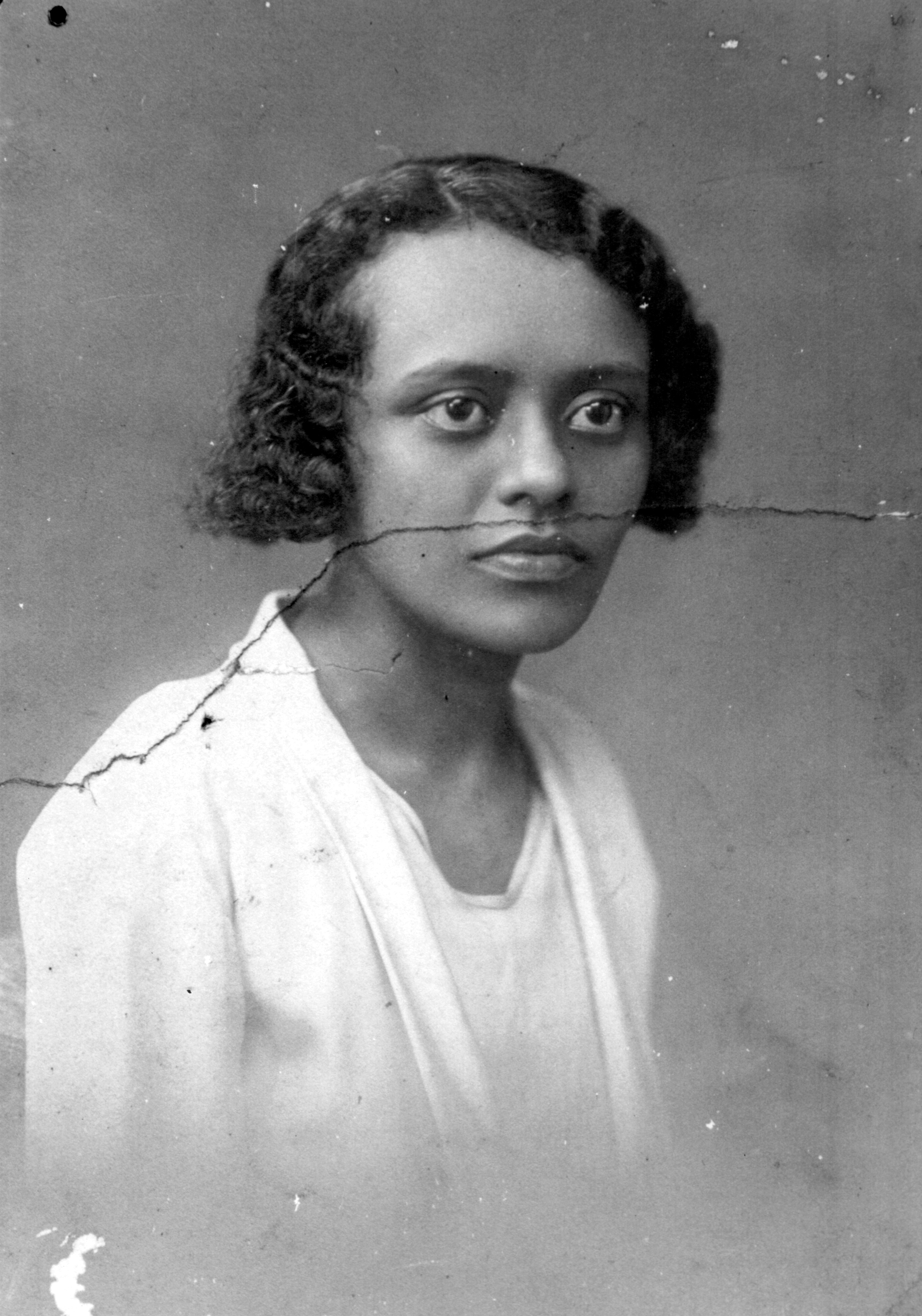
- Portrait of Almerinda Gama taken between 1910 and 1928
- Born: May 16, 1899; Maceió, Alagoas, Brazil
- Died: March 31, 1999 (aged 99); São Paulo, Brazil
- Occupations: Lawyer, trade unionist, journalist, poet and politician

Almerinda Farias Gama (May 16, 1899 – March 31, 1999) was a Brazilian lawyer, journalist, pianist, poet, trade unionist, composer and politician. Gama was one of the first Black women to participate in Brazilian politics and played an important role in the history of feminist activism in Brazil. She also trained as a typist in Belém and as a lawyer in Rio de Janeiro.

Her life story is the subject of the biography "Almerinda Gama: a sufragista negra" written by journalist Cibele Tenório and published in 2025 by Editora Todavia.

== Biography ==
Born in Maceió, Alagoas, on May 16, 1899, she was the daughter of teacher Eulalia Maria da Rocha and merchant José Antônio Gama. In 1907, Almerinda Gama moved to Belém, after her father's death, and was raised by her paternal grandmother, Almerinda Silva Gama, and her aunt, Emília Gama. While living in Pará, she worked as a typist and wrote for the newspaper A Província.

She married the poet and writer Benigno Farias Gama at the age of 23, with whom she had a son, who died as an infant. She became a widow in 1925 when her husband succumbed to tuberculosis. In 1935, she had another son from a relationship with an engineer, but both died before Almerinda Gama.

=== Political career ===
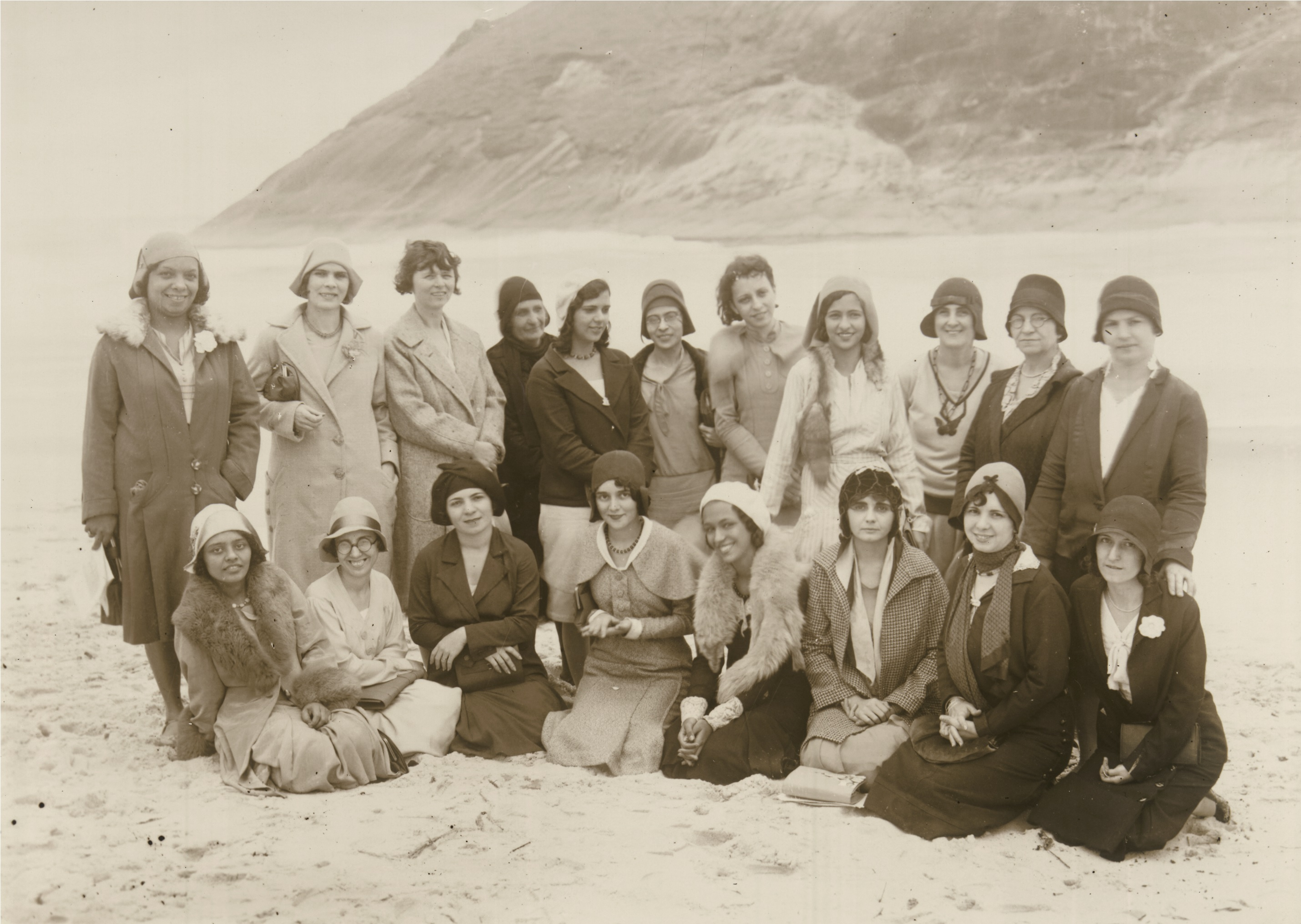
Gama on an excursion with members of the Brazilian Federation for Women's Progress, on July 14, 1930

Gama during the National Constituent Assembly of 1934

In 1929, she moved to Rio de Janeiro for work reasons, after discovering that a male colleague earned 300 réis for the same work she did for 200 réis. Therefore, she decided to work in a place where she could be better paid. She became president of the Typists, Stenographers and Secretaries Union of the Federal District. She supported Bertha Lutz's campaign for the presidency of the Brazilian Federation for Women's Progress (FBPF).

In Rio de Janeiro, Gama graduated as a lawyer and became fully involved in political and feminist struggles. Shortly after arriving in the city, she joined the FBPF and became an activist for women's suffrage. As a representative of her class, she was eventually appointed, in 1933, as a delegate in the vote that chose the members of the constituent assembly that would draft a new Constitution for Brazil. Gama and Carlota Pereira de Queirós were the only women in the aforementioned Constituent Assembly.

She ran for federal deputy in 1934 but was not elected. She was a leader of the Brazilian Proletarian Socialist Party (PSPB), and she remained at the head of the Party until 1937, the year in which it was dissolved due to the Estado Novo coup d'état.

She gave several interviews about her politics throughout her life. One of these interviews took place in 1984, given to historians Angela de Castro Gomes and Eduardo Stotz, which was part of the Velhos Militantes project. In 1992, when she lived in the suburbs of Rio de Janeiro, she gave another interview to the feminist organization ComMulher.

Gama's Typists' Union membership card

Some of her personal documents are located at the Fundação Getúlio Vargas, such as her voter registration card, her work card at the Typists' Union, and her card from the Association of Court Clerks in the Federal District. In addition, her articles "Escreva-se a História" and "Atualidades Trabalhistas," from 1975, can also be found.

=== Musical career ===
Almerinda Gama learned to play the piano in childhood and resumed the habit in old age, as shown by research by journalist Cibele Tenório. Gama claimed to have created 90 pieces of music, 29 of which were housed at the National School of Music in Rio de Janeiro. These compositions are in various musical styles, such as waltz, samba and baião, and are undated. Some of these pieces were recorded by the Brazilian Piano Institute.

In 1944, the song "Quem chora comigo" (music by Hilda Matos and lyrics by Almerinda Gama) was presented at the Sally Loretti festival to benefit the musician Assis Valente (1911 – 1958), who was ill, according to a report in the newspaper A Noite, November 19, 1944, in the first column.

== Tributes and death ==
Almerinda Gama died at the age of 99, on March 31, 1999, in São Paulo. The previously unknown date of her death was revealed by journalist Cibele Tenório, who discovered her death certificate during her research.

Gama is considered an important activist for the rights of women and Black people, as well as for the trade union movement in Brazil during the 1930s, and has received various honors. On February 18, 1934, Almerinda Gama was honored by having her name given to the Almerinda Gama Gymnasium, which was run by Laurentino Garrido, in São João de Meriti, Rio de Janeiro, due to her contributions to education. She was also honored as the protagonist in the short documentary film Almerinda, uma Mulher de 30 (lit. 'Almerinda, a woman of 30'), directed by filmmaker Joel Zito Araújo, in 1991.

An entry was dedicated to her in the book Dicionário Mulheres de Alagoas: Ontem e Hoje, released in 2007.

In 2015, the short film Almerinda, a Luta Continua (lit. 'Almerinda, the Struggle Continues'), produced and directed by researcher Cibele Tenório in partnership with the Centro de Pesquisa e Documentação de História Contemporânea do Brasil, was released. And in 2016, the São Paulo Municipal Government established the Almerinda Farias Gama Award to distinguish initiatives in the field of communication related to the defense of the Black population.

In 2020, Cibele Tenório defended a Master's Dissertation in History at the University of Brasília (UnB), entitled A Vida na Ponta dos Dedos (lit. 'Life at the Fingertips'), which aimed to investigate the life trajectory of Almerinda Gama, contributing to filling gaps about aspects of her life. The master's dissertation gave rise to the biography "Almerinda Gama: a sufragista negra", authored by Cibele Tenório and published by Todavia in 2025. The book project won the Todavia Nonfiction Prize in 2023.
