= Nísia Floresta =

Brazilian educator, translator, and writer

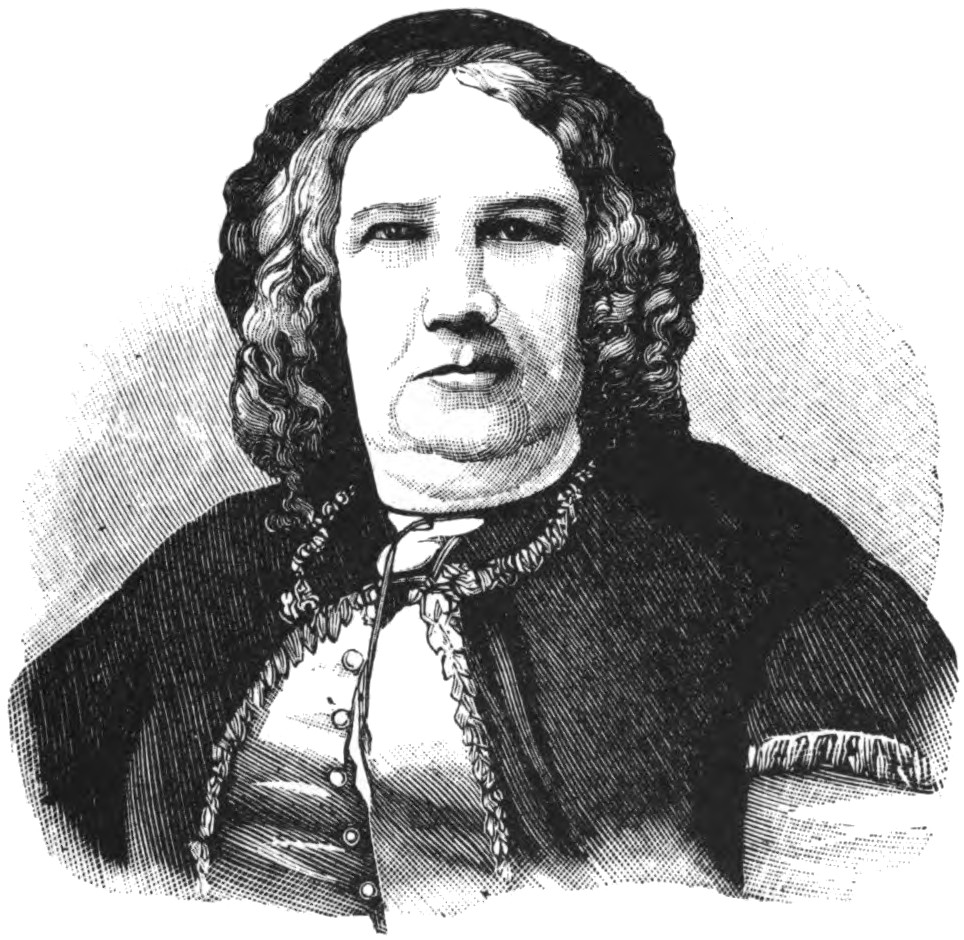
- A portrait of Floresta appeared in Mulheres Illustres Do Brazil in 1899.
- Born: Dionísia Gonçalves Pinto; October 12, 1810; Papari, Brazil
- Died: April 24, 1885 (aged 74); Rouen, France
- Occupations: Philosopher, Educator, Writer
- Spouse: Manuel Augusto de Faria Rocha (m. 1828)
- Children: 2
- Writing career
- Language: Portuguese, French, Italian
- Genres: Poetry, nonfiction, travelogue
- Subjects: Social issues, philosophy, travel, feminism, education

Nísia Floresta Brasileira Augusta, pseudonym of Dionísia Gonçalves Pinto, (October 12, 1810 in Papari, Rio Grande do Norte – April 24, 1885 in Rouen, France) was a Brazilian educator, translator, writer, poet, philosopher, and feminist.

She is considered the "first Brazilian feminist," having been the major force behind a foundational text on women’s rights in Latin America: Direitos das mulheres e injustiça dos homens (The rights of women and the injustice of men). She is also possibly the first still in the 19th century to break through public-private boundaries by publishing her works in newspapers, when the local press was just beginning. However, her influence extends beyond just this text, having coordinated a girls' school in Rio de Janeiro, and writing a book in defense of the rights of women, Native Americans and slaves. Floresta was the only Brazilian writer in the nineteenth century to travel abroad and publish her travel writing.

== Personal life ==
Dionísia Gonçalves Pinto was born October 12, 1810 in Papari, in the north eastern province of Rio Grande do Norte. She created the name Nísia Floresta Brasileira Augusta as a pseudonym under which she published her written works. The name Nísia Floresta Brasileira Augusta was an act of self-construction under which she wrote, taught, and lived. Each component of the name was intentional and significant. ‘Floresta’ after her parents’ land where she was born, ‘Brasileira’ as a patriotic statement of her identification with the newly independent Brazil, and ‘Augusta’ in homage to her late husband, Manuel Augusto de Faria Rocha.

Floresta was a public intellectual who achieved international recognition during her lifetime. Her work extends well beyond her free translation of Mary Woolstonecraft's A Vindication of the Rights of Woman for which she is mostly known (made in 1832 when she was only 22 years of age), and includes poetry, travel writings, and philosophical essays on morality and education. Most of these works have autobiographical content and are concerned with female virtues and moral upbringing. While the majority of Floresta’s works are in Portuguese, she also wrote in French and Italian, and some of her works were translated to English, Italian, and French during her lifetime, ensuring that her ideas circulated well beyond Brazil.

There were many significant events in Floresta's early life that shaped her work and future. In 1823 Floresta married at the age of thirteen, but quickly returned to her family. Five years later in 1828 Floresta's father was assassinated at the command of a powerful member of the state's elite. That same year, she married Manuel Augusto de Faria Rocha, who she had two children with. Manuel Augusto died only seven months after the birth of their second child, leaving Floresta to support herself and two very young children, which she did by teaching. In 1832, Floresta's published her first work in Recife, and shortly afterwards the family moved to Porto Alegre. Then in 1837, Floresta and her family moved to Rio de Janeiro where she established the Augusto College school for girls, where she taught and published her works for more than ten years.

=== Time in Europe ===
Floresta resigned as director of Augusto College in 1849 and traveled to Europe with her daughter after a serious horse riding accident. During this time, she was exposed to Comtean positivism through a History of Humanity course taught by Auguste Comte himself at the Palais Cardinal in Paris. She returned to Brazil in 1852 and dedicated herself to writing newspaper articles, which were later compiled into her Opúsculo humanitário, as well as other works such as Dedicação de uma amiga and Páginas de uma vida obscura. She volunteered as a nurse during a 1855 cholera epidemic in Rio de Janeiro before leaving for Europe again in 1856.

Floresta stayed in Europe from 1856 to 1872, during which time she traveled through Italy and Greece, publishing works in French and writing travel accounts. Between 1870 and 1871, she left Paris, on account of the Prussian siege, and traveled to England and Portugal before returning to Brazil. She was in Brazil from 1872 to 1875 during the abolitionist campaign led by Joaquim Nabuco, although little is known about her life during this period. She returned to Europe in 1875 and stayed in London, Lisbon, and Paris. She published her last work, Fragments d'un Ouvrage Inédit: Notes Biographiques, in France in 1878. These trips to Europe exposed her to many new ideas and ways of thinking, such as Comtean positivism, that further radicalized her feminism.

On April 24, 1885, Floresta died from pneumonia in Rouen, France, at age 74. She was buried in the Bonsecours cemetery in France where she lived. In August 1954, nearly seventy years later, her remains were taken to her hometown and placed in a tomb at the Floresta farm where she was born.

== Scholarly works ==
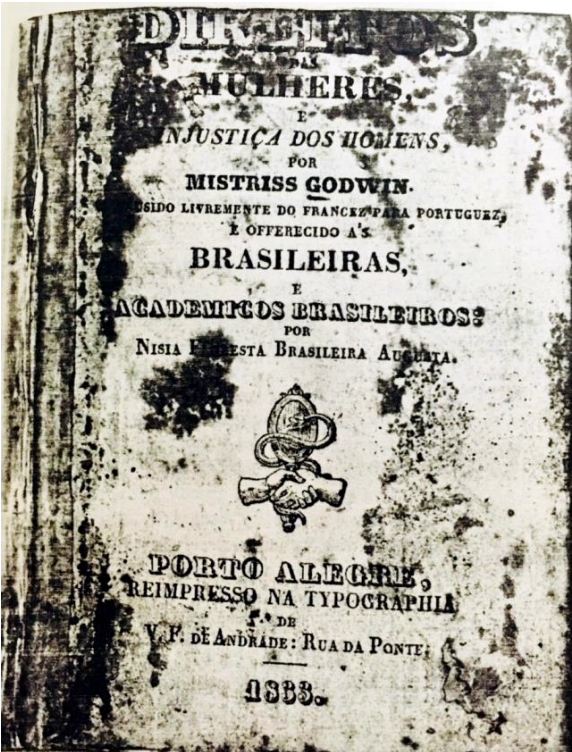
Direitos das mulheres e injustiça dos homens.

Floresta published many books and newspaper articles. Her first book, Direitos das mulheres e injustiça dos homens, published in 1832, is accredited with being a pioneer publication in Brazil on women's rights, especially dealing with education and work. This book was inspired by English feminist Mary Wollstonecraft’s book, Vindications of the Rights of Woman. Floresta did not simply translate Wollstonecraft's book, but instead used the text to introduce her own reflections on then-conservative Brazilian society. Therefore, Direitos das mulheres e injustiça dos homens is not a direct translation, but instead a free translation.

It was this book that gave Floresta the title of the precursor of feminism in Brazil, and even Latin America itself, since there are no records of previous texts made with the intentions of educating and reflecting on one’s society in relation to feminism. Floresta did not stop there; in other books she continued to highlight the importance of women's education for both women and society. Son Conselhos a minha filha (1842), Opúsculo humanitário (1853), where the author condemns the educational training of women, in Brazil and in other countries, and A Mulher (1859) are all examples of this.

In addition to her first book, she had many pieces published in newspapers in Recife starting in 1830. Floresta also had many notable stories, poetry, novels, and essays that were later published in Rio de Janeiro newspapers. In 1841 she published her second book, under the title of Conselhos à minha filha, which was a twelfth birthday present for her daughter Livia. Starting in 1847, her works began to include more thoughts on education while still focusing on gender equality. That year she also published Daciz ou A Jovem Completa, Fany ou also known as Modelo das Donzelas e Discurso, which was directed at her students. Later in her career, during her stay in Europe, Floresta published various accounts of her travels. Unfortunately, these journals have become difficult for scholars to locate. This is due to them getting lost or because Floresta often signed her publications with an alias. The author's articles signed with "Quotidiana Fiesole", for example, were found in the newspapers O Recompilador Federal and O Campeão da Legalidade. From May to June 1851, the newspaper O Liberal from Rio de Janeiro published a series of articles by Floresta, titled The Emancipation of Women, where she discussed the relevance of education for women.

In 1853, Floresta published her book Opusculo Humanitario. The book is a collection of articles on female emancipation and favorably speaks about Auguste Comte, the father of positivism. The book discusses the author's thoughts on female education, in addition to addressing pedagogy in a general way. It also criticizes the teaching institutions of the time and their lack of focus and support for women.

Throughout her works, Floresta discusses many aspects of her personal life, including herself, her childhood, her deceased husband, and her family. There are also various travel stories within her writings. Among them are the itinerary of a trip to Germany, information about her three years in Italy, and discussion of a trip to Greece. The first of these travel accounts was published in Paris, France in 1857 and translated into Portuguese in 1982. The second, also published in Paris in French, was in two volumes published in 1864 and in 1872. Only the first volume was translated to Portuguese in 1998.

=== List of works ===
- Direitos das mulheres e injustiça dos homens (Women's rights and injustice of men), 1832
- Conselhos à minha filha (Advice to my daughter), 1842
- Daciz ou A jovem completa (Daciz or The complete young woman), 1847
- Fany ou O modelo das donzelas (Fany or The model of the maidens), 1847
- Discurso que às suas educandas diriga Nísia Floresta Brasileira Augusta (Speech to her students led Nísia Floresta Brazilian Augusta), 1847
- A lágrima de um Caeté (The tear of a caeté), 1849
- Dedicação de uma amiga (Dedication of a friend), 1850
- Opúsculo humanitário (Humanitarian brochure), 1853
- Páginas de uma vida obscura (Pages of a dark life), 1855
- A Mulher (The woman), 1859
- Trois ans en Italie, suivis d’un voyage en Grèce (Three years in Italy, followed by a trip to Greece), 1870
- Le Brésil (Brasil), 1871
- Fragments d'um ouvrage inèdit: notes biographiques (Fragments of an old work: biographical notes), 1878

== Educational philosophy and work ==
Floresta arrived in Rio de Janeiro on January 31, 1838, and, later that year, founded Augusto College. She announced the opening of the school in the Jornal do Comércio and it operated in the center of the capital city for seventeen years. At the time, there was a surge of new schools in Rio de Janeiro, most of which were directed by Europeans and followed foreign education models. Augusto College was different from these other schools because it focused on educating women and girls, rather than men. Students were taught science, languages, history, religion, geography, physical education, arts, and literature with the intention of fully preparing them for marriage and motherhood.

One reason Floresta founded the college was because most of the top schools in the area at the time were not accepting women. Augusto College's innovative mission was to provide women with an education that was on par with what was available to men. Floresta and her school both received significant criticisms because of their radical approaches to educating women. Instead of only teaching girls traditional topics like sewing and housework, the curriculum also included intellectual and scholarly materials. This was unpopular at the time because it was viewed as unnecessary to educate women in such topics if they were going to be housewives. Competing educators were especially critical of Floresta and her teachings.

Floresta worked to educate women because she believed that education was the key to empowerment, and that its absence was a leading cause of discrimination against women. Access to education would help women recognize and address their unequal social standing. Floresta also believed that an ignorant population could be more easily manipulated by its government, and that was something she hoped to avoid by advocating for education for marginalized groups. Her philosophies around teaching and gender equality were guided by liberal, progressive, and positivist ways of thinking.

In her three works from 1847, all of which relate to teaching, Floresta criticized the education system that considered the sciences to be useless and corrupting to women. She also addressed the general failure of the teaching community and its current education standards in her 1853 work Opúsculo humanitário. In particular, she denounced schools run by foreigners who she claimed were unprepared to act as academic counselors or teachers.

== Feminist ideology ==
Floresta's feminist ideology primarily stems from her emphasis of female virtues. Specifically, she claims that to be a woman is to practice virtue, such as resignation, modesty, charity, loyalty to one's family, and obedience. The most important virtue that she considers, however, is the woman's natural possession of generosity or "self-denial." In their generosity, women focus on caring for others, such as tending to the wellbeing of their husbands and children, while happily performing domestic chores. Interesting, Floresta also believes that the virtue of generosity leads to women's political agency, such as "healing" the wounds of the modern world. This sentiment leads Floresta to argue that educated men ought to value women for their supreme virtue, as opposed to treating them as objects and value them for their beauty.

While Floresta believes that women possess natural virtues, she also argues that they must receive a moral education to learn about the application of these virtues. Mothers, in turn, should also provide their children with moral education, so that women can raise good citizens that can benefit the polity. Therefore, although Floresta focuses on motherhood and domestic care, she believes that women's moral virtues can shape society.

Floresta's role and relevance in the evolution of feminism in Brazil and in the emancipation of women in the country is undeniable. However, it is necessary to consider the politics of the author's own time and the context that she worked within. Scholars have criticized her somewhat ambivalent feminist views for not being militant enough and for shifting between avant-garde and conservative. For Constância Lima Duarte, author of the book Nísia Floresta: Vida e Obra (Nísia Floresta: Life and Work), Floresta fits into what she calls “good feminism.” This means that she did not intend to substantially change social relations, keeping women within the ideological limits of the private sphere. She wanted to improve women's education and empowerment while ensuring that they were still responsible for childrearing and other housework.

Another author to address this ambivalence is Branca Moreira Alves, for whom Floresta's feminism contains a romantic view of women where dedication to the family and home is still the guiding expectation. Floresta suggested several ways to maintain this traditional family system and keep a home, husband, and children in her various works.

Scholars have also acknowledged the ideological shift that Floresta underwent as a writer and a feminist. In her first work, she rejected radical changes to the present social order. She made it clear that she wanted things to stay in their current state and was not trying to impose any major changes. After her travels in Europe, however, her second work on the subject was more sharply analytical of the current education system and called for large-scale reform. She also expressed concerns about an ignorant population being open to manipulation.

== See also ==
- First-wave feminism
- List of feminists
- Women's suffrage
- Feminism
