= Feminism in Brazil =

The origins of feminism in Brazil trace back to the 19th century. During the Empire of Brazil, some jurists attempted to legalize women's suffrage, with or without the consent of the husband. Later, the republican constitution of 1891 did not exclude women from voting, because they were not considered individuals who could have rights. That made some women request, without success, their inclusion among the voters. The 1891 constitution initially had a clause that gave women the right to vote, but it was abolished in its last version because the idea that politics was not an honorable activity for women prevailed.

Some historical moments of this time were important in the advance of women's struggle, such as the 1917 strikes, the rise of the Communist Party of Brazil in 1922 and, in the same year, the Modern Art Week in São Paulo. In 1919, Bertha Lutz, who is considered a pioneer in the Brazilian feminist movement along with Nísia Floresta, founded the Brazilian Federation for Women's Progress, which fought for voting rights and the right to work without the husband's authorization.

Rio Grande do Norte and Minas Gerais were pioneer states in legalizing the female vote. The first registered female elector was Celina Guimarães Viana. Celina, in 1927, invoked article 17 of Rio Grande do Norte's electoral law, which states: In Rio Grande do Norte, all citizens who meet the conditions required by law, will be able to vote and be voted for, regardless of gender. On 25 November 1927, she requested to be included among the voters, a request which judge Israel Ferreira Nunes approved.

The Brazilian feminist movement was heavily influenced by the feminist movements in the United States and Europe.

== History ==
The republican constitution of 1891 already assured women the right to vote, depending on how it was interpreted. Article 70 stated that are electors all citizens who are above 21. The term "citizens", according to the interpretation of the time, referred only to men. Women only effectively got the right to vote in 1932.

=== 19th Century ===
The Brazilian feminist movement began midst 19th century, when women from several parts of the country started to aim for more political and cultural participation in society, in which, at that time, was patriarchally dominated. During that time, women were perceived in an overall negative manner. If they weren't workers or service providers, women were confined to a domestic bubble – taking care of the house and children, complying with the social constructs that were expected from them. In addition, the possibilities women had to enter an educational system were limited, the possibilities women had to aim for higher education were not possible, since they were seen as beings with questionable intellectual capacity and they had no access to political activities. Women in higher social classes could participate in certain activities in the cultural and artistic fields, such as painting, literature, and music, the same were considered tolerable as long as further specialization didn't occur. Teaching was seen as an honorable profession, however, it was also surrounded by prejudice and limitations. As said by Regina Zilberman,

"Destining women to teaching solved several problems: it justified the need to educate them; it solved the problem of the lack of workers for teaching, a profession that was little sought after because it was poorly paid; there was no need to improve earnings, because the salary of the woman should not be superior to man, but additional. These reasons were covered by others, of an ideological nature: the teacher was idealized, calling them mothers and, thus, suggesting that, in teaching, she remained faithful to her nature maternal; the professional element of teaching was denied, because the classroom became a second home; teaching would not be a problem, because it was not work, but an extension of domestic tasks, which stopped the eventual emancipatory tendency that this activity could contain and did not contradict the sexist nature of Brazilian patriarchal society; and the woman-wife-mother association remained untouched, and also idealized, even when she was away from home, earning modest gain.”

It was through the dedication of certain women to the press and literature that feminist ideas started to gain notice. According to Zahidé Muzart,

“in the 19th century, women who wrote, and who wished to have a career as writers, were feminists, since only the desire of leaving the domestic bubble indicated a thoughtful thinking. So, in its origins, the feminist literature in Brazil was always linked to a feminist emancipation.”

The feminist achievements in the 19th century were small, and favoured, in a general sense, only white women from middle and higher classes, but still, in the eyes of Silva & Pedro, “already demonstrated the union in regards to common goals of the feminine sex that would come to influence the next generations of feminists.”

=== 20th century ===
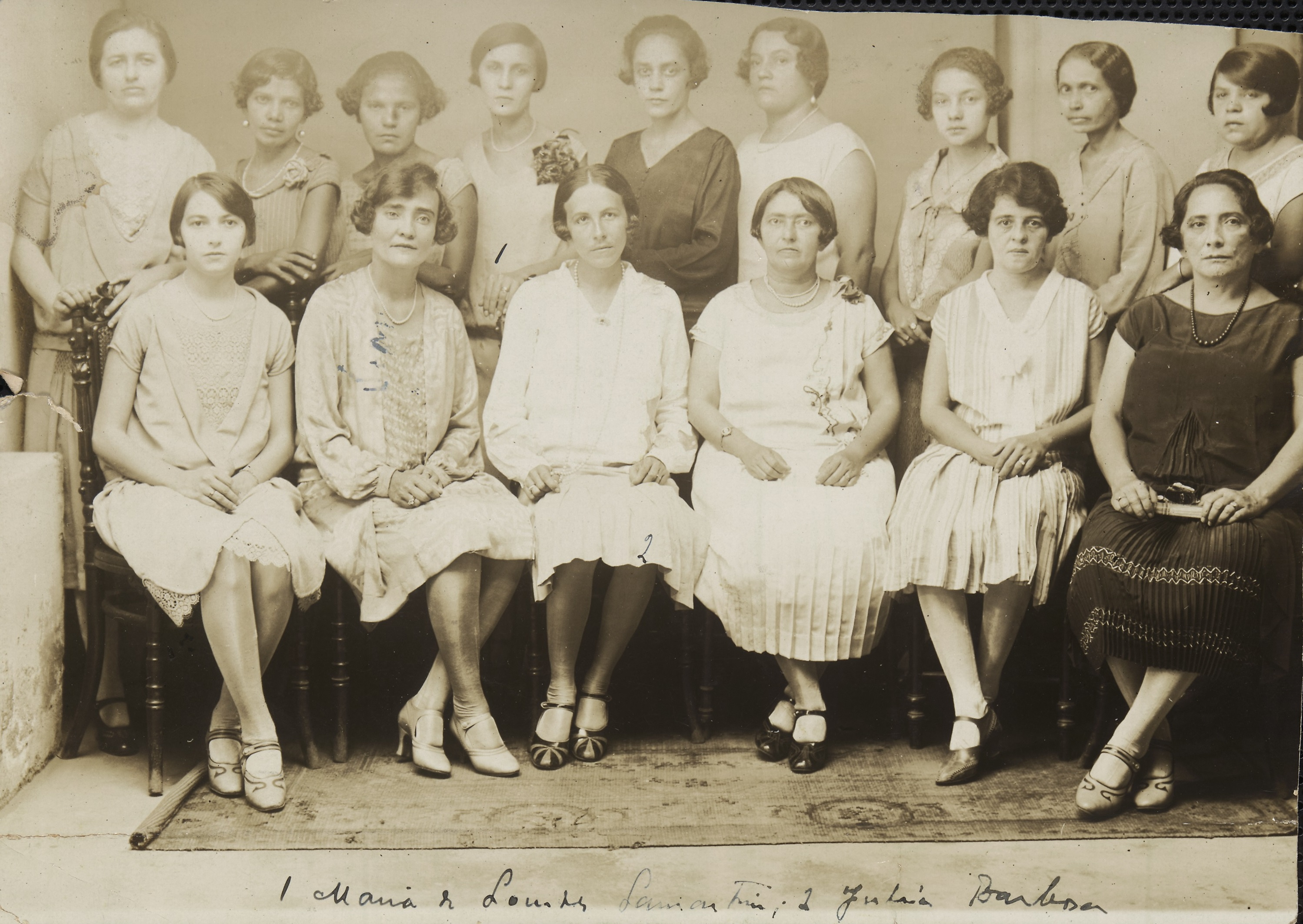
First female voters in, Natal, Rio Grande do Norte, in 1928.

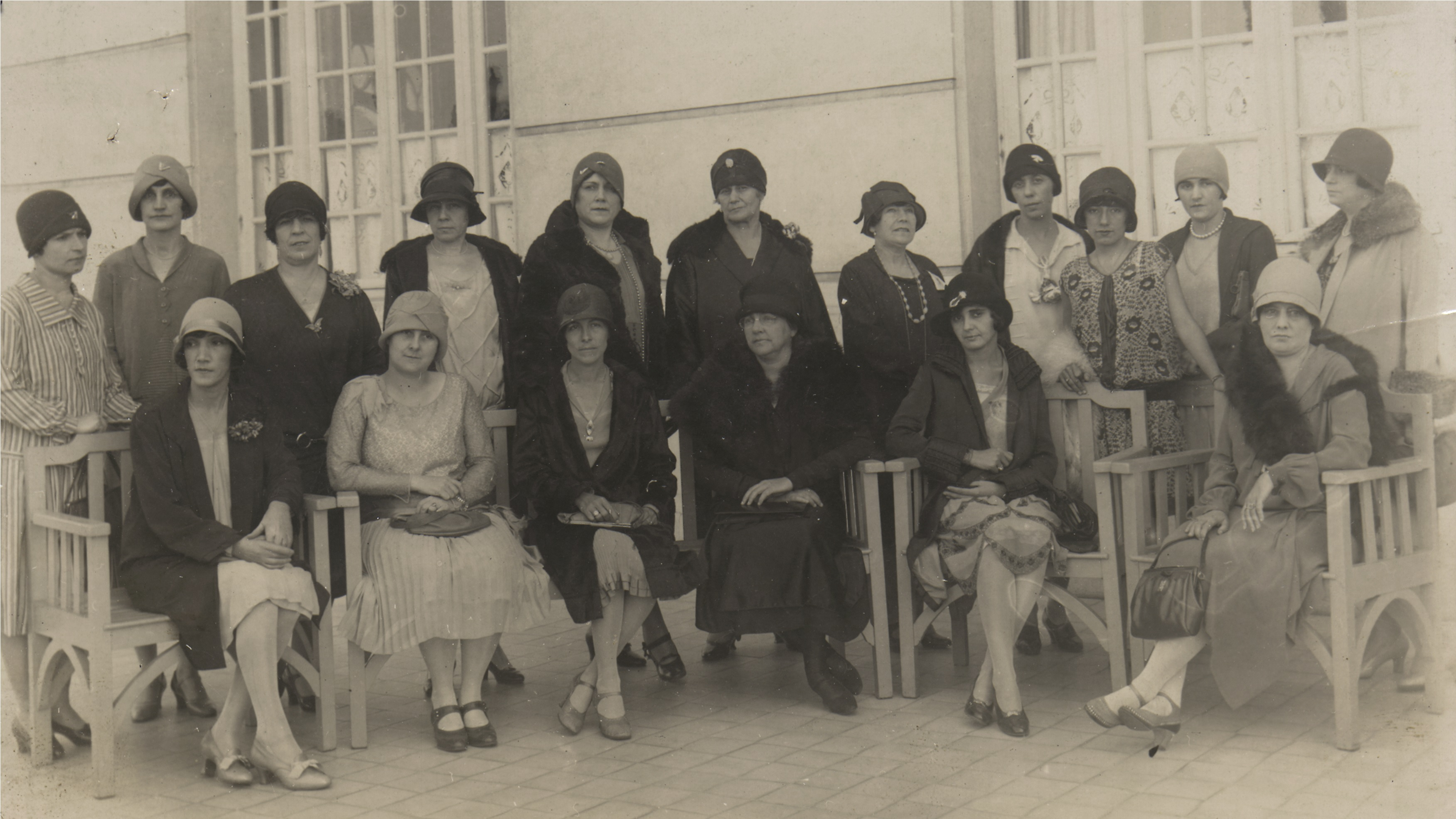
Integrants of the Brazilian Federation for Women's Progress, in 1930.

In Brazil, the feminist movements were inspired by the European struggles. Nísia Floresta is one of the first to manifest herself as a force in the pursuit of equality for women, as well as Bertha Lutz, who created the Federation for Women's Progress, in 1930; and Jerônima Mesquita, who fought for women's right to vote and tool part in several social and philanthropical activities.

In a national level, the fact that received most attention from all women was having writer, lawyer, and feminist Miêtta Santiago, in 1928, noticing that the prohibition of women's vote contradicted the First Brazilian Republic Constitution(February 24, 1891), already effective at the time. The article states, simply, that “citizens over 21 years old…” with no discrimination of gender. With this in mind, Miêtta filed, as a lawyer, a security mandate and obtained a sentence, which allowed her to vote herself for a federal deputy mandate.

The electoral code elaborated in 1933 finally extended the right to vote and the political representation to women; in the constituent of 1934, there was a woman representative, the first woman deputy of Brazil: Carlota Pereira de Queiroz. In 1947, with the help of Bertha Lutz, Pereira de Queiroz founded the Soroptimist Club in Rio de Janeiro, an international association of women who aimed to improve the quality of life of women in their local life conditions.

==== 1960s and 1970s ====
In the 60s and 70s, feminism arose throughout Europe and with in the US and got its impulse from the political and cultural upheavals those regions were going through, which challenged the conservative values of society, and in this context The Second Sex by Simone de Beauvoir was published.

However, in Brazil the scenario was very different. The country was going through a right-wing military dictatorship. In the height of repression, the feminist movement emerged again through the hands of Romy Medeiros da Fonseca. This movement widened the range of the demands, including the principle of equality between husband and wife in marriage and the introduction of divorce in Brazilian legislation.

During the military dictatorship, women organized themselves, regardless of political parties, age and social class, to form militancy against the military regime. In 1975 the UN organized the "International Women's Year". The issue of women became a topic of discussion in universities and among liberal professionals. In the same year, the International Women's Congress took place in Mexico and simultaneously in Brazil, which sent Bertha Lutz to Mexico as a representative. In Brazil, the movement organized the Research Week on the Role and Behavior of Brazilian Women.

As a result of this movement, in September 1975, the Centro da Mulher Brasileira was created, an institutionalized body responsible for intermediating and articulating feminist goals in the form of collective action. The Centro da Mulher Brasileira proposed a study center that promoted major seminars and major discussions and research on the condition of women. From there emerged several publications in newspapers and magazines in addition to the production of books.

A very striking fact for feminists was the death of Ângela Diniz, in 1976, by Doca Street, who in 1979 was acquitted. The indignation of feminists brought about the movement that created SOS Mulher. From then on, there was greater protection for women, including those who worked and suffered sexual exploitation and blackmail by employers.

==== 1980s ====
From 1980 onwards, a definition of the situation of women also became essential among political discourses. In 1983, through official decrees, the Conselho Estadual da Condição Feminina in São Paulo was created and in 1985 the Conselho Nacional dos Direitos da Mulher. It was also in that year that women from various parties came together and, hand in hand, occupied 26 seats as constituent deputies, giving greater and more significant representation to women's rights. The accomplishments of the feminist movement were great, as a consequence of all the previous years of struggle. In 1980, the show TV Mulher (TV Woman) aired in the Rede Globo TV network, in which themes such as kitchen and decoration were discussed. Later, the necessity to talk about the body, sexuality and freedom arose. The female spectators sent their doubts concerning sexual freedom and curiosities about their own bodies to the host, Marta Suplicy. A need for liberation was perceptible in women. Brazilian music was taken by singers of great success, such as Simone, Rita Lee, Maria Bethânia, Fafá de Belém and Joana. Many songs turned into icons of the time: Começar de novo (Simone), Atrevida(Simone), Cor de rosa choque (Rita Lee).

Concerns about the intersection of race and class with feminism also began developing, with events such at the National Meeting of Black Women highlighting ways in which contemporary feminism was not addressing the concerns faced by poor women and women of colour.

=== 21st Century ===
In the first years of the 21st century, Brazilian feminists celebrated the repeal of the article in the Penal Code dealing with the crime of "rape" as a victory, since in this provision there was the expression "honest woman", considered offensive by the feminist movement.

The feminist movement currently has as its main banners, in Brazil, the fight against domestic violence, which reaches high levels in the country; combating discrimination at work. It also gives importance to the study of gender and the contribution, until today somewhat forgotten, of women in the various historical and cultural movements in the country. The legalization of abortion (which is currently only allowed under exceptional conditions) and the adoption of independent lifestyles are goals of some groups.

In the feminist thought of the 21st century, Magda Guadalupe, director of the Simone de Beauvoir Society, to apply Simone de Beauvoir's thinking in Brazil, understands feminism as a plural movement, which involves several waves and must be understood as feminisms, as it goes beyond the simplicity of the struggle for equal rights between men and women, emphasizing that it proposes to present alternatives in terms of analyses, practices and discourses, with a view to deconstructing the social and binary roles between sexes and genders that feed patriarchy.

== Historical Notable Persons ==
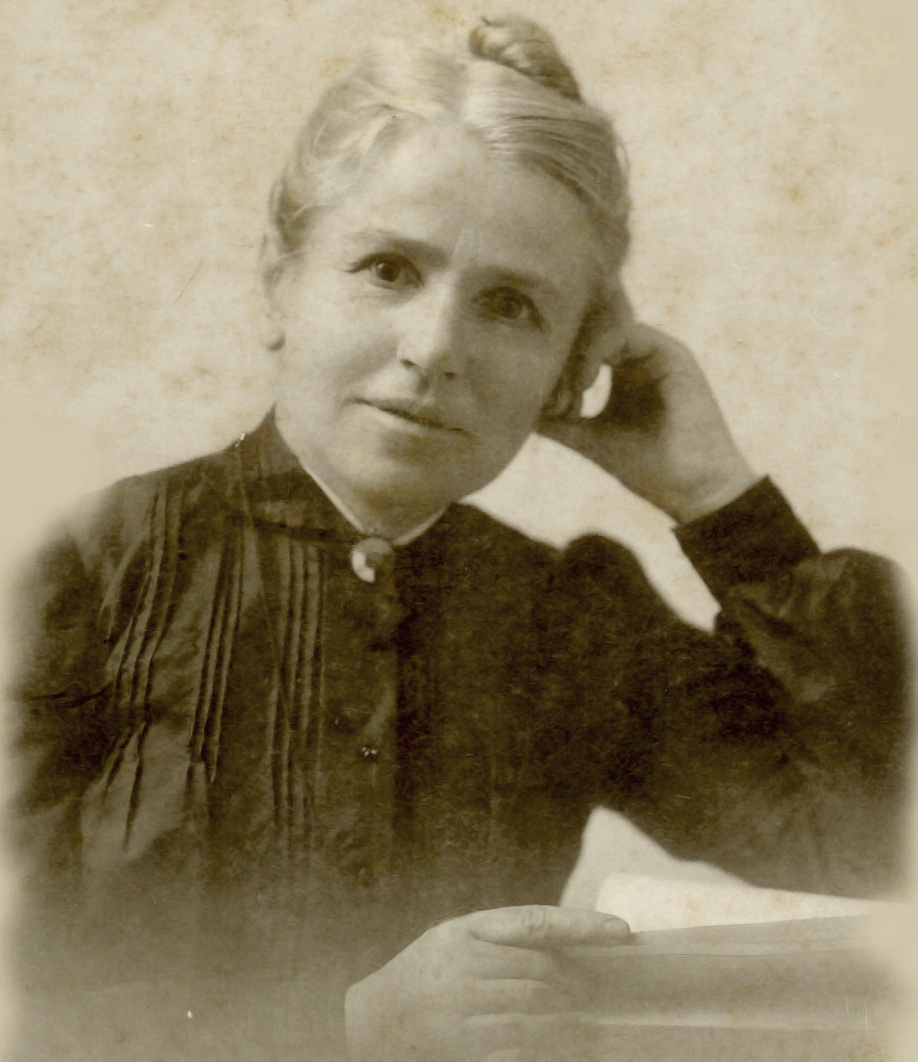
Marie Rennotte - Physician and Feminist

Marie Rennotte (1852–1942) A native Belgian and naturalized Brazilian teacher and physician, who was active in the fight for women's rights. Rennotte directed the obstetrics and maternity unit of the Maternity Hospital of São Paulo.

In 1901, she was admitted as a member of the São Paulo branch of the Brazilian Historic and Geographic Institute. She conducted research at the surgery of the Santa Casa da Misericórdia on the effects of chloroform as an anesthetic from 1906 to 1910. Then she traveled to Europe to study how to establish a Red Cross Branch in São Paulo. Upon her return she founded the local branch in 1912, opened a nurses training school, and began a campaign to found the first children's hospital in São Paulo. She continued to practice medicine through the mid-1920s, but increasingly in the late 1920s and the 1930s became more involved in the international feminist movement and scientific conferences.

In 1922, she founded the Aliança Paulista pelo Sufrágio Feminino (Paulistan Alliance for Women's Suffrage). By the late 1930s, suffering from ill health, blindness and deafness, she was granted a state pension, which she collected until her death in 1942. She is remembered for her work to improve women's educational and health care options, and women's rights to employment and citizenship. She is also recognized as one of those who defined feminist thought in Brazil during the 19th century.

Patricia Acioli - February 14, 1964 in Niterói, August 12, 2011 (in Niterói) was a Brazilian judge and feminist. She was the first judge to be murdered in the State of Rio de Janeiro. Acioli championed the rights of battered women and fought against organized crime and corrupt police officers. She was murdered by masked men on motorbikes outside her house in 2011. Eleven police officers, including its chief, were convicted of planning and executing the murder.

== See also ==
- Women's rights in Brazil
- Ele Não movement – 2018 demonstrations against Jair Bolsonaro's presidential campaign
