= National Meeting of Black Women =

Brazilian activist meeting

The first National Meeting of Black Women (Portuguese: I Encontro Nacional de Mulheres Negras; ENMN) took place in Brazil from December 2 to December 4, 1988, in Valença, Rio de Janeiro. 450 women from 17 Brazilian states attended. The purpose of this meeting was to foster greater solidarity and organizational structure among black Brazilian women, particularly Fluminense women. Prior to the national meeting, the First State Meeting of Black Women of Rio de Janeiro (Portuguese: I Encontro Estadual de Mulheres Negras of Rio de Janeiro) occurred in 1987.

== Meeting ==
The National Meeting challenged certain sectors of the feminist movement and male leaders of the black movement. It took place in the city of Nova Iguaçu, Rio de Janeiro. Some of the participants had also attended the IX Encontro Feminista in Garanhuns, where some had been of the opinion that racial concerns were largely absent from the discussions. According to Sandra Bello, issues of class and race were prominently addressed during the meeting. Some feminists were hesitant to accept the active participation of black women, particularly in discussions related to favelas. At state-level meetings, white feminists were questioned about their control over the "quotas of participation of black women in the meetings".

== See also ==
- Afro-Brazilian feminism
- Feminism in Brazil
- Women's rights in Brazil
