= Afro-Brazilian feminism =

Afro-Brazilian feminism is a social movement that seeks to address systemic violence and discrimination against Afro-Brazilian women. Afro-Brazilian women created their feminism in order to mitigate the lack of space and representation given to them in mainstream/white feminism in Brazil. Overall, Afro-Brazilian feminism addresses the intersectionality between racism, sexism, and classism, due to the social and economic exclusion of Afro-Brazilian women in Brazil.

== History ==
=== Enslaved Black Women and Resistance ===
Afro-Brazilian women played a crucial role in resistant against slavery in Brazil, both overtly and covertly. They displayed agency and resistance to their enslavers in the 16th century up to emancipation in 1888. During the Trans-Atlantic Slave Trade, Brazil received over five-million enslaved people, the most of any country. During this time, women resisted in both daily acts and organized movements. For instance, one of the most note-able displays of resistance from enslaved peoples was the Quilombo Dos Palmares (c. 1605-1694) in Northern Brazil. One note-able female figure is Dandara, who is remembered as a freedom fighter who fought alongside male leaders against Dutch colonial forces who sought to destroy Palmares. Dandara is remembered for training warriors, being a leader in defense, and helping to sustain Palmares' self-sufficient economy through agriculture and trade.

Moreover, in areas like Bahia and Rio De Janeiro, women also resisted their enslavers pre and post-abolition through economic agency. Before emancipation in 1888, in some urban areas enslaved peoples could buy freedom by alforria (manumission). Some enslaved women used street markets, the ability to sell information, and hiding fugitives as opportunities. For instance, Emilia Soares de Patrocinio, born in 1805, was an enslaved women who worked as a market vendor while enslaved until she made enough to buy her own freedom in 1839. Another example an enslaved women displaying agency and resistance against slavery can be seen in Esperança Garcia. Garcia was enslaved on a Jesuit plantation where she learned to read and write. In 1770, Garcia wrote a petition to the president of the province of São José do Piauí, Gonçalo Pereira Botelho de Castro, where she denounced the act of slavery and the suffering she and her young son had endured including detailed descriptions of beatings.

Some enslaved women also fought against slavery by helping to lead slave revolts. One example of this can be gleaned from Mariana Crioula an enslaved women born in 1808 who led a slave revolt alongside Manuel Congo in the Rio de Janeiro province, freeing over 400 enslaved peoples in 1838., Additionally, the Malê Revolt also was led by prominent female figures such as Luísa Mahin who was detailed to be a major player and organizer of the Malê Revolt in Bahia much of which is known through the biographical notes and a poem written by her son Luís Gama (1830–82).,

=== Abolition Movements ===
Afro-Brazilian women also played an important, and sometimes overlooked, role in shaping and furthering the abolition movement in Brazil. Most documented political movements involving prominent female leaders can be seen in the decades proceeding the Lei Áurea. Many women in urban area like Bahia and Rio De Janeiro worked as vendors, which gave them social mobility to spread abolition ideas, hide fugitives, and raise funds for others to buy their freedom. Prominent figures such as Maria Firmina dos Reis used the literature to speak on brutality of slavery and advocate for freedom. Women also organize and maintain community networks of escaped enslaved peoples and free Black populations called Quilombos. Their contribution was crucial in ways such as fostering communication with nearby Quilombos, cultivating crops, and practicing healing with African-derived medicinal knowledge.

Legal action was also a form of resistance using by Afro-Brazilian women to outwit the system which kept them captive. In 1838 Ursula Canton received a notice from officials that her daughter was to be removed from her home. Canton took legal action to petition for custody of her daughters, Francisca and Guadalupe, and for her own freedom. In doing so, she filed a freedom suit arguing that she was wrongfully enslaved and displayed evidence testimony to support her case.

== Organizations ==
=== Pretas Simoa ===
Named after Tia Simoa, an enslaved but later free woman who led the 1881 Jangadeiros Strike in Fortaleza, Pretas Simoa (English: Black Simoa) is a black female-led activist group. It is situated in the province of Fortaleza Cairi. Pretas Simoa focuses on empowering Afro-Brazilian women by reclaiming black women's historical and contemporary representation in Brazilian society. They are active in deconstructing the hyper-sexualization of black women in media and everyday life. Additionally, Pretas Simoa seeks to discover the omitted history of black women in both contemporary and historical resistance. Pretas Simoa's hope in rewriting Afro-Brazilian women as protagonists rather than sidenotes or victims in their own history, is to "strengthen the bonds of their own identity".

More recently, in a statement titled "From the slave quarters to the postcard: My flesh is not of your Carnival", Pretas Simoa speaks out on the hyper-sexualization of black women and the term mulatta during the Carnival season. Pretas Simoa calls out the hypocrisy of the media during this time, in which the media ecstatically looks for light-skinned black women to fill the role of the Globeleza, a woman who dances the samba in body paint to advertise the Carnival season. Pretas Simoa calls out this hypocrisy, because it is only during this season that black women receive glorification and praise in the media. Outside of Carnival season, black women are ignored, underrepresented, and depicted as slaves or domestic workers in the media. Pretas Simoa also discusses the psychological and violent impact the hyper-sexualization of black women has on black women's daily lives. In their statement they declare "[t]his violence is of a moral order, as it slanders us and hurts our honor and reputation; it's physical in jeopardizing the integrity of our body as we are seen as 'available'; and also psychological, as it implies directly the perception that we have of ourselves and interferes with our affectionate and sexual behavior that sustains this cruel hyper-sexualized identity in which we are seen and often ends up implicated in the reflection that we see in the mirror".

=== Odara ===
Odara, also known as Instituto de Mulher Negra, is an Afro-Brazilian feminist organization that is oriented towards improving the "socio-political and economic inclusion of black women and their families in society". Odara aims to accomplish socio-political and economic inclusion by tackling individual and systemic discrimination issues such as: lower salaries, less access to higher learning, sterilization, unemployment and psychological and emotional scarring from the aforementioned discrimination.

Several projects that Odara has worked on include: Home Goal, Weaving the Black Women Network, and Teacher Training Program to Work with Law 10.639. Home Goal focuses on training black women as political actors in democratic participation, specifically regarding sporting mega-events. Weaving the Black Women Network was a project organized to strengthen black women's organizations and combat racism, sexism and lesbophobia through public policy initiatives, to ensure the inclusion of Afro Brazilian women in "the new development cycle of the Northeast and the fight against violence". Lastly, Teacher Training Program to Work with Law 10.639 facilitates a partnership between civil society and the federal government in order to ensure the preservation of Afro-Brazilian culture in Brazilian society. In all, Odara is an organization that focuses on the socio-political inclusion and empowerment of Afro-Brazilian women.

== Protests ==
=== Demonstration at Marcha das Vadias – Slut Walk ===
During the 2014 Marcha das Vadias (SlutWalk), a group of black women organized by Coletivo Negracao held demonstrations that called attention to violence against black women. The goal of this demonstration was to highlight the way black women's dual identities as black and women intersect to create dual oppression, different from that of the predominately white feminists at Marcha das Vadias. During the demonstrations, women chanted things such as "Claudie Ferreria resists", referring to and standing in solidarity with the black woman who was murdered and then dragged on the street attached to a military police van in Rio de Janeiro. In addition to the chants, phrases such as "This is not an invitation", were written on the bodies of the demonstrators to protest sexual abuse and sexism against black women.

The protest proceeded to divide into two locations: a women's police station and Cidade Baixa. At the women's police station, the focus was violence against women perpetrated by the police. Open letters with demands, such as better service conditions at the station, increased vacancies in shelters for female victims of violence, and violence prevention programs. Protesters as well laid in the street to symbolically depict the systemic violence against black women in Brazil. The sector of the protest that continued to Cidade Baixa, marked the pavement with graffiti at places where sexist, racist, and homophobic events occurred. One of the demonstration stops was at Pingium bar, in which protesters booed, kissed, and burned the entrance carpet along with their bras.

=== Marcha das Mulheres Negras ===
The Marcha das Mulheres Negras, which translates to "Black Women's March", took place on November 18, 2015. Marcha das Mulheres Negras gathered more than 10,000 black women from all socioeconomic backgrounds, ranging from domestic workers to politicians and professors. This march was the first ever national Afro-Brazilian women's march in Brazil. Together they marched against poverty, violence, and racism. Slogans such as "I do not accept my place in the kitchen" and "I want to be in the revolution" were chanted. Major highways and streets of the city were cut off and blocked by protesters. These actions were symbolic of black women reclaiming space for themselves outside of the periphery of Brazilian society. After the march, a group of protesters met with the president and Nilma Lino Gomes, Brazil's minister of women, racial equality, and human rights.

Ivana Braga, an organizer for the march stated, "As we leave this march, I know that the black woman's fight in Brazil is stronger... We won't be as invisible any more, and our concerns and needs will start to be addressed on the political agenda."

== Situation in Brazil ==
=== Violence ===
According to Mapa da Violencia 2015, violence against black women in Brazil increased by 54 percent between 2003 and 2013. In 2013 alone, more than 2,800 black women died from violence. Violence against white women in the same 10-year period decreased 18 percent. Additionally, of the 60,000 homicides in Brazil each year, more than 40,000 are Afro-Brazilian, meaning black women are losing their family members at a higher rate than white women, and thus suffering greater rates of psychological and emotional trauma than their white counterparts.

According to Newsweek's Why the Progress Made by Brazil's Activists Might Now Unravel, of 16 percent of the killings in Rio over the last five years, and from 2010 to 2013, 79 percent of those victims were black. Under the current presidency of Michel Temer, proposals set forth by the Rousseff administration to decrease homicides through targeted police training and monitoring have been discarded.

=== Workplace Discrimination ===
Statistics from Mapa de Violence 2015 show that on average black women earn approximately 364 dollars per month, which is 44 percent of the average pay for white men, 75 percent of the pay for black men and 60 percent of the pay for white women.

=== Body Exploitation ===
==== Carnival ====
In 2013, Nayara Justino was voted as the Globeleza, a samba dancing representative for the carnival season, only to be removed shortly after for allegedly being too dark. Justino was replaced by a much lighter skinned black woman with mixed descent. Justino faced racist harassment via social media, and was given no concrete reason by Globo, the company behind the Globeleza as to why she was replaced.

Traditionally, the role of the Globeleza is given to lighter skinned black women, cited as perhaps the only time black women are represented and celebrated in Brazilian media, representative of the hyper-sexualization of black women.

=== Sexual Tourism ===
Due to the abolition process with no minimum humanitarian base, the image of Afro-Brazilian women is often linked to prostitution, and this was accentuated even more in the years of military dictatorship (De Politica Politica), where the image of a country of marvels was sold as treats for foreigners.

=== Temer Presidency ===
Temer is determined to cut back on spending for health care, education, social programs, and "cap minimum wage increase", policies that directly harm Afro-Brazilians and the poor. Temer's actions are in direct opposition to the political allies that Afro-Brazilians found during the Lula and Rousseff administrations. Under Lula and Rousseff, Afro-Brazilians received state help to get out of poverty and received university aid though affirmative action policies. Temer has downsized Brazil's ministry of racial equality, negatively impacting affirmative action, black history education programs, and anti-racism education initiatives. Additionally, despite high rates of violence towards Afro-Brazilians by authorities, policies set by Temer's predecessor Dilma Rousseff to decrease homicides through targeted police training and monitoring have been discarded.

== See also ==
- Feminism in Brazil
