= Carlota Pereira de Queirós =

Brazilian feminist and politician

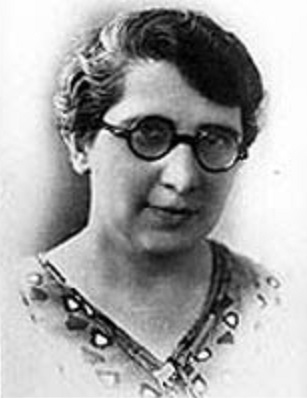
- Carlota Pereira de Queirós

Personal details
- Born: 13 February 1892 São Paulo, Brazil
- Died: 14 April 1982 (aged 90) São Paulo, Brazil

Carlota Pereira de Queirós (Note: Also spelled "Queiroz".) (13 February 1892 – 14 April 1982) was a Brazilian feminist and politician. She was the first woman to vote and be elected to the Brazilian parliament, and took part in writing the constitution of 1934.

== Biography ==
Carlota Pereira de Queirós was born on 13 February 1892, in the city of São Paulo. She was the daughter of José Pereira de Queiroz and Maria Vicentina de Azevedo Pereira de Queiroz. She graduated from the Faculty of Medicine of the University of São Paulo in 1926, with the thesis "Estudos sobre o Câncer" (Studies on Cancer). An intern in the third chair of Clinical Medicine at the Faculty of Medicine of Rio de Janeiro and head of the Pediatric Clinical Laboratory (1928), she was an assistant to Professor Pinheiro Cintra. She was commissioned by the government of São Paulo in 1929 to study Infant Dietetics in medical centers in Europe.

During the Constitutionalist Revolution of 1932 in São Paulo, she organized and led a group of 700 women to assist the wounded.

=== Political career ===
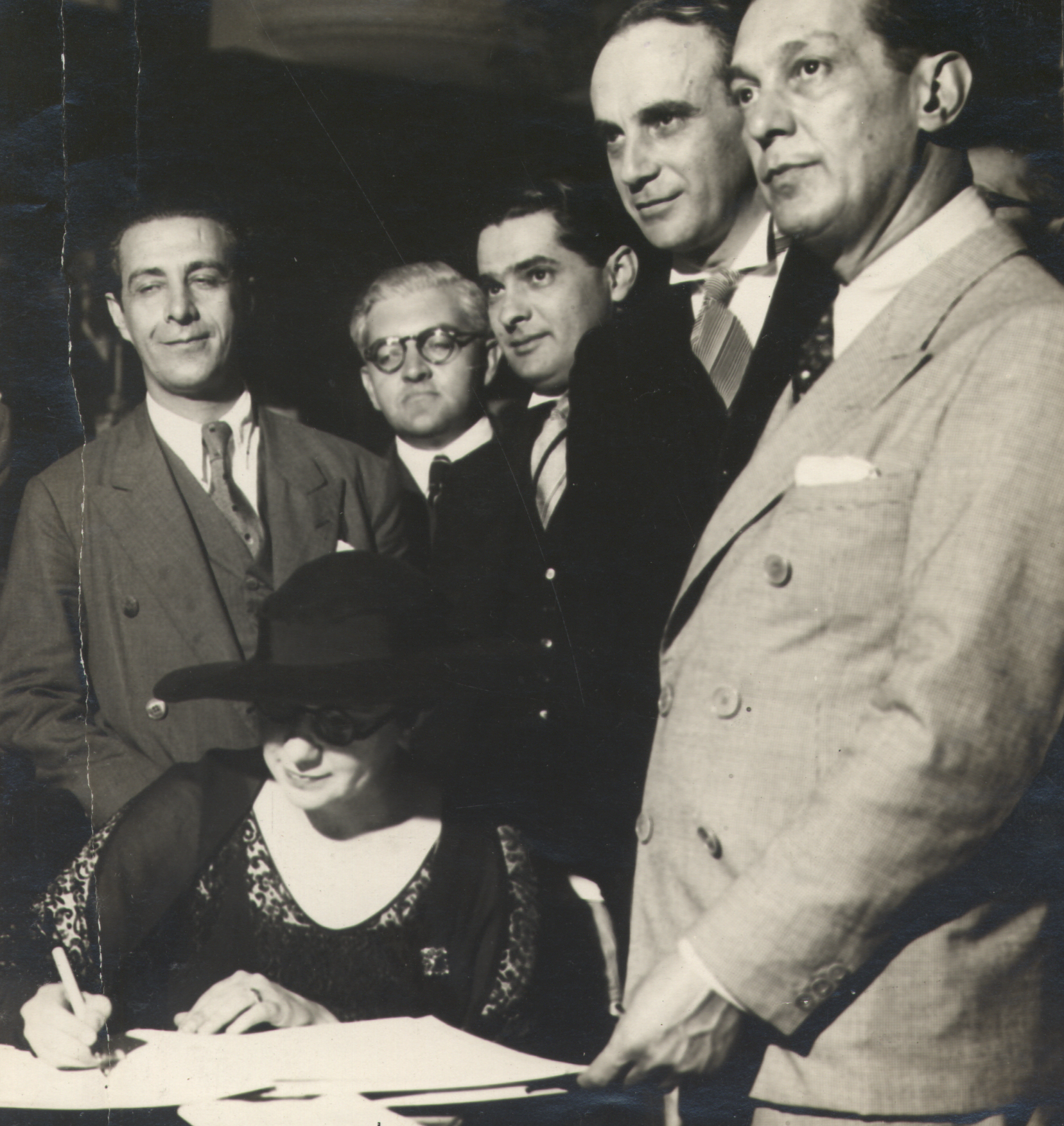
Carlota in the Constituent Assembly of 1934.

On 3 May 1933, the first election in which women officially participated as voters and candidates throughout Brazil to choose deputies for the National Constituent Assembly, Carlota was one of 19 female candidates among Alzira Reis Vieira Ferreira, Anna Vieira Cesar, Bertha Lutz, Edith Mendes da Gama e Abreu, Catharina Valentim Santanna, Edith Dinorah da Costa Braga, Edwiges Sá Pereira, Georgina de Araujo Azevedo Lima, Ilka Labarthe, Julitta Monteiro Soares da Gama, Leolinda de Figueiredo Daltro, Lucília Wilson Coelho de Souza, Lydia de Oliveira, Maria Pereira das Neves, Maria Rita Burnier Pessoa de Mello Coelho, Martha de Hollanda Cavalcanti de Albuquerque, Natercia da Cunha Silveira, Theresa Rabello de Macedo, and Almerinda Farias Gama.

Entering politics, she became the first female federal deputy in the history of Brazil. Her term in office was dedicated to defending women and children; she worked for educational improvements that included better treatment of women. Furthermore, she published a series of works in defense of Brazilian women. She held her position until the 1937 coup d'état, when Getúlio Vargas closed Congress.

== Tributes ==
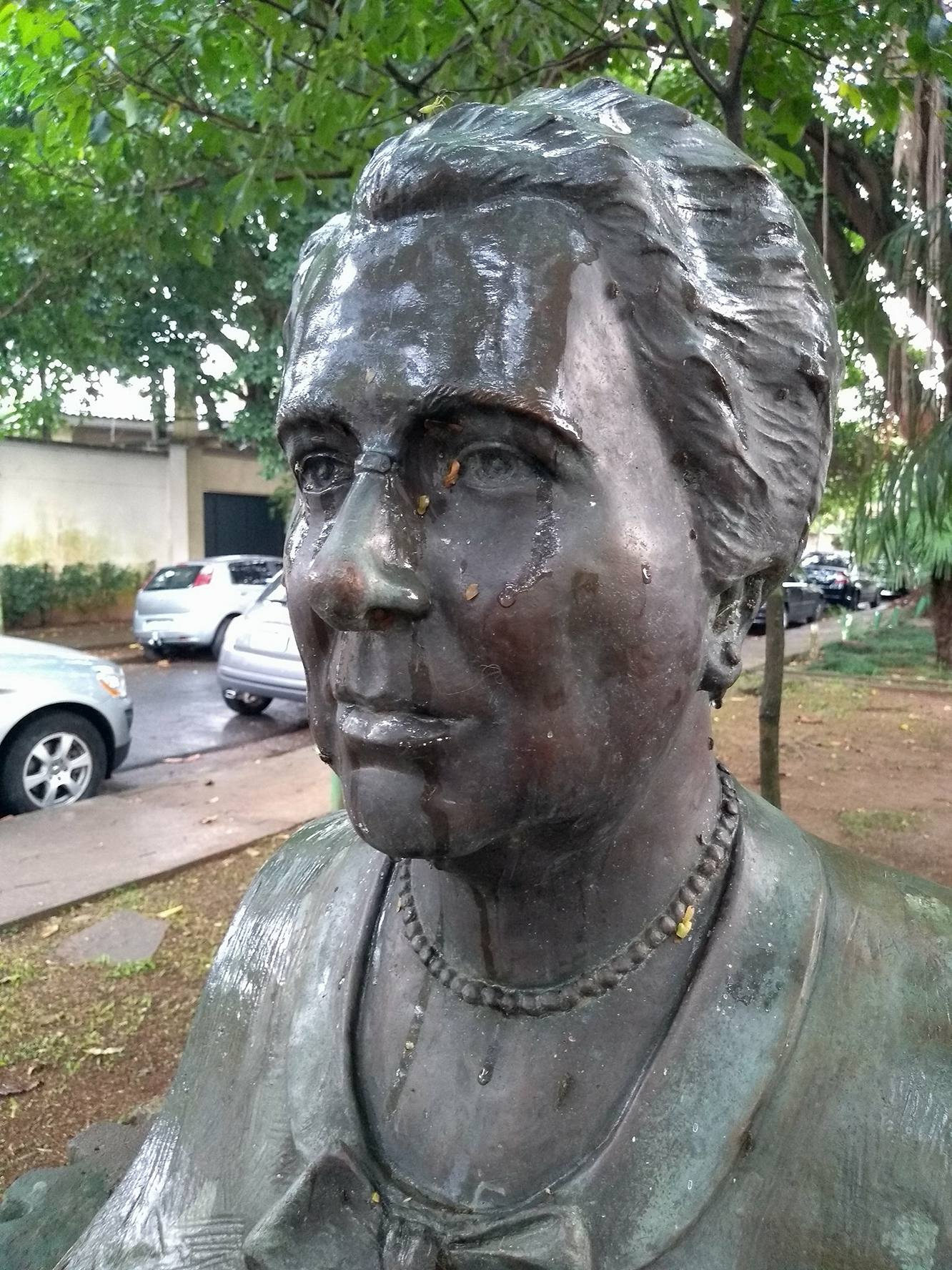
Bust made by the sculptor Luis Morrone.

She was honored with the monument entitled Carlota Pereira de Queiroz, in Praça Califórnia, Pinheiros neighborhood, West Zone of São Paulo, and with Avenida Dr.ª Carlota Pereira de Queiroz, in the district of Socorro, located in the South region of São Paulo. In addition, there is the EMEF Carlota Pereira de Queiroz school in the city of São Paulo, inaugurated in her memory.

The Chamber of Deputies, through the Commission for the Defense of Women's Rights, established the Carlota Pereira de Queirós Woman-Citizen Diploma Award, which aims to honor women "whose work or actions have contributed to the full exercise of citizenship, in the defense of women's rights and gender issues in Brazil."
