= Nathercia da Cunha Silveira =

Brazilian suffragist (1905–1993)

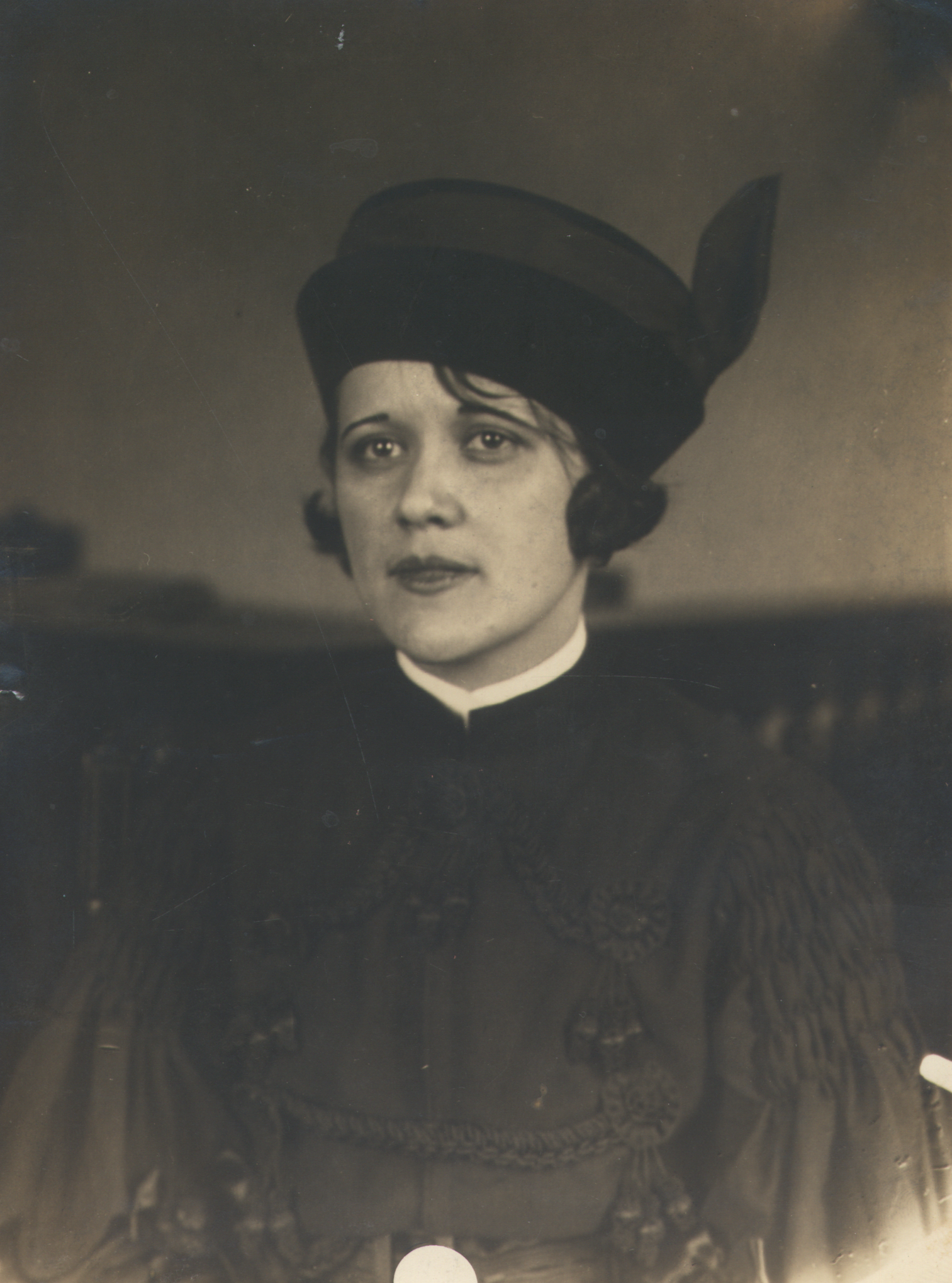
- Nathércia da Cunha Silveira in 1927
- Born: 14 March 1905; Itaqui, Rio Grande do Sul, Brazil
- Died: December 7, 1993 (aged 88); Brazil
- Education: Federal University of Rio Grande do Sul
- Occupations: suffragist, trade unionist and lawyer
- Employer(s): National Labor Council, National Department of Labor, Labor Court
- Organization(s): Brazilian Federation for Women's Progress, Women's University Union
- Spouse: Paulo Arthur Pinto da Rocha (m. 1933, died 1972)
- Children: 1
- Awards: Order of Labor Merit with Special Merit

Nathércia da Cunha Silveira (14 March 1905 – 7 December 1993) was a Brazilian suffragist, trade unionist and lawyer. She was first woman to earn a law degree in Rio Grande do Sul, worked as Assistant Attorney General of the National Labor Council and was the first female general director of the National Department of Labor.

== Early life ==
Silveira was born on 14 March 1905 in Itaqui, Rio Grande do Sul, Brazil. Her father was Manoel da Cunha Silveira, a public prosecutor in Itaqui and a member of the Partido Libertador (Liberator Party), her mother was Maria da Conceição do Valle Cunha. She was one of six children.

== Career ==
=== Law ===
In 1926, Silveira was the first woman to earn a law degree from the Federal University of Rio Grande do Sul in Porto Alegre. After graduating, Silveira practiced as a defence lawyer. In 1926, she moved to Rio de Janeiro to continue practicing law there. She was interviewed shortly after her arrival by the publication O Paiz and spoke about feminism, voting rights and education.

In late 1929, she joined the legal team of writer Sylvia Thibau, who was charged with murdering journalist Roberto Rodrigues in the newsroom of the newspaper A Crítica. Sylvia was acquitted by a 5-2 vote.

=== Women's University Union ===
In 1929, Silveira was one of the founders of the União Universitária Feminina (Women's University Union) in Rio de Janeiro, alongside fellow professional women Orminda Ribeiro Bastos (lawyer), Herminia de Assis (doctor), Myrthes de Campos (lawyer), Maria Alexandrina Ferreira Chaves (lawyer), Juana Lopes (doctor), Bertha Lutz (zoologist), Heloisa Marinho (professor), Carmen Portinho (civil engineer), Maria Ramalho (lawyer), Amélia Sapienza (civil engineer) and Emilia Snethlage (naturalist and ornithologist).

=== Women's suffrage ===
As a suffragist and member of the Federação Brasileira pelo Progresso Feminino (Brazilian Federation for Women's Progress), Silveira advocated for equal voting conditions for men and women in Brazil. In January 1931, Silveira and fellow lawyer and suffragist Elvira Komel met with politicians, including Oswaldo Aranha (Minister of Justice and Internal Affairs), Adolpho Bergamini (Mayor of Rio de Janeiro) and José Maria Whitaker [pt] (Minister of the Interior) as well as Cardinal Sebastião da Silveira Cintra, to ask for their support for the cause of women's suffrage.

In 1932, when women over 21 with their own income and authorisation to vote from their husbands were granted the right to vote in Brazil, Silveira and Lutz were the only women appointed to the Commission to draft the preliminary of the new Constitution. After political disagreements with Lutz, Silveira founded the Aliança Nacional das Mulheres (National Women's Alliance). The Alliance's activities included monitoring women's working conditions, providing legal assistance, and organising a fund to support homeless women.

In 1934, Silveira ran as a candidate for city councillor for the United Front of the Federal District and was elected as an alternate. Later in the 1930s, Silveira worked as Assistant Attorney General of the National Labor Council.

== Marriage ==
In 1933, Silveira married Paulo Arthur Pinto da Rocha, a doctor and member of the Brazilian Academy of Medicine, and they had a daughter together. Her husband died in 1972.

== Later career ==
In 1964, Silveira became the first woman to hold the position of general director of the National Department of Labor (DNT). She met with President Humberto de Alencar Castelo Branco in 1965 to discuss the crisis in the sugar industry and growing unemployment in the northeast of Brazil. Later that year, President Branco appointed her to receive the Ordem do Mérito do Trabalho Getúlio Vargas Mérito Especial (Order of Labor Merit with Special Merit).

In 1966, she took office as Attorney General of the Labor Court. Silveira retired in 1971, receiving the Commendation of the Public Prosecutor's Office on her retirement.

== Death ==
Silveira died in 1993.
