= Leolinda Daltro =

Brazilian teacher, suffragist, and indigenous rights activist (1859–1935)

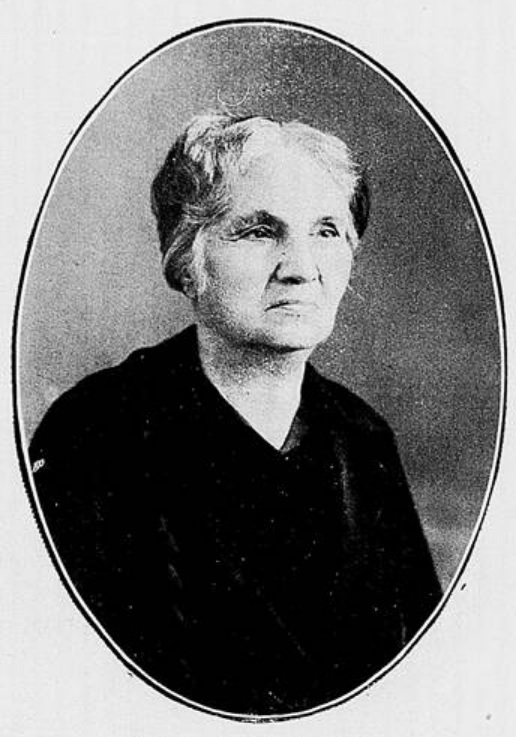
- Born: 14 July 1859; Bahia, Brazil
- Died: 4 May 1935 (aged 75); Rio de Janeiro, Brazil
- Resting place: Cemitério São João Batista
- Occupations: Teacher, suffragist, indigenous' rights activist

Leolinda de Figueiredo Daltro (14 July 1859 – 4 May 1935) was a Brazilian feminist teacher, suffragist and indigenous' rights activist. In 1910, she was one of the founders of the Feminine Republican Party (Partido Republicano Feminino), which advocated for the Brazilian women's right to vote.

== Biography ==
Leolinda Daltro was born in the state of Bahia. She moved to Rio de Janeiro with her second husband and five children to teach. In 1896 she travelled throughout the countryside in a mission to give formal education to Brazilian indigenous peoples and help to assimilate them to the newly formed Republic. She established herself among the Xerente people of the current state of Tocantins. Differently to the religious missions, Leolinda believed in a secular education for the natives, and she advocated for demarcation of their lands and respecting their cultures.

Daltro returned to Rio in 1897. She founded the Grêmio Patriótico Leolinda Daltro for defending the indigenous peoples' rights. She became a friend of Orsina da Fonseca, wife of president Hermes da Fonseca. They founded the Escola Orsina da Fonseca, a vocational school where women learned arts, sciences and crafts. She also founded the Linha de Tiro Feminino (Feminine Shooting Line), as Daltro believed women should have counted as citizens and have the right to defend their country.

The Brazilian Constitution of 1891 barred women from voting. Daltro founded the Partido Republicano Feminino (Feminine Republican Party) in 1910, alongside other women, among them the poet Gilka Machado, fighting for the women's right to vote. The party was inspired by the British suffragettes. In 1917, her party led a march for women's suffrage in Rio de Janeiro, of which 90 women participated.

In 1919, Daltro presented her protest candidacy for intendente (mayor) of Rio, as a way to raise awareness of the suffragist movement. After PRF, another women's rights' organizations were formed, such as Federação Brasileira pelo Progresso Feminino, founded in 1922 by Bertha Lutz. Women eventually gained the right to vote in 1932.

== Death ==
Daltro died on May 4, 1935, aged 75, after being hit by a car.
