= Papari =

Papari Папари
- Village
- Location within Bosnia and Herzegovina
- Coordinates: 44°51′N 15°48′E
- Country: Bosnia and Herzegovina
- Entity: Federation of Bosnia and Herzegovina
- Canton: Una-Sana
- Municipality: Bihać

Area
  - Total: 1.53 sq mi (3.97 km^{2})

Population (2013)
  - Total: 511
  - Density: 333/sq mi (129/km^{2})
- Time zone: UTC+1 (CET)
  - Summer (DST): UTC+2 (CEST)

Papari (Serbian Cyrillic: Папари) is a village in the municipality of Bihać, Bosnia and Herzegovina.

== Demographics ==
According to the 2013 census, its population was 511.

Ethnicity in 2013
Ethnicity	Number	Percentage
Bosniaks	486	95.1%
Croats	1	0.2%
Serbs	1	0.2%
other/undeclared	23	4.5%
Total	511	100%
