= Romy Medeiros da Fonseca =

Brazilian lawyer and feminist (1921–2013)

Romy Medeiros da Fonseca (30 June 1921 to 22 July 2013) was a Brazilian lawyer and feminist activist. She is best known for her work as an author of the 1962 revisions to the Brazilian Civil Code recognizing the rights of married women, and the 1977 Brazilian laws regarding divorce.

At the request of Brazil's national congress, in 1972 Romy Medeiros da Fonseca led the Conferência Nacional da Mulher Brasileira (CNMB, in English the Brazilian National Woman's Conference).

== Biography ==
Romy Medeiros da Fonseca graduated from law school at the Universidade Federal do Rio de Janeiro, specializing in family law.

In May 1949, Romy and her husband, lawyer Arnoldo Medeiros da Fonseca, participated in the VII Congress of Civil Rights in the United States, where she led a workshop about the situation of Brazilian women. This international conference gave Romy a new perspective on the legal situation of married women in Brazil, where the 1916 Brazilian Civil Code subordinated the rights of married women under the control of their husbands.

After returning to Brazil, Romy requested that the Brazilian Chamber of Deputies produce a report on the status of married women under the Brazilian Civil Code. Working with lawyer and feminist Orminda Ribeiro Bastos (1899–1971), Romy Mendeiros da Fonseca used this study as a starting place to draft a new proposal expanding women's rights.

Their proposed new legal statute expanding the rights of married women was subsequently presented to the National Congress in 1951. After being shelved for ten years, and following pressure from the Brazilian women's movement, the National Congress finally approved the amendments to the Civil Code on August 27, 1962; the measure was then signed into law by President João Goulart as Law No. 4.121. The new law eliminated the previous requirement that married women receive the authorization of their husbands to work outside of the family home.

In 1966, during the Brazilian dictatorship, Romy founded the Congresso Nacional de Mulheres Brasileiras (National Congress of Brazilian Women).

In 1972, Romy organized the first Brazilian Women's Congress, inviting the participation of Brazilian and foreign participants to debate the role of women in political development. She served as Brazil's delegate to the Inter-American Commission of Women and the Organization of American States.

Romy promoted the integration of women into military service.

Romy Medeiros da Fonseca was an advocate for the decriminalization of abortion in Brazil.

== Personal life ==
Romy was born in Rio de Janeiro in 1921. She was the daughter of José Gomes Leite da Fonseca and Climéria da Fonseca Martins.

Romy married lawyer and civil law professor Arnoldo Medeiros da Fonseca, with whom she had two children.

== Published works ==
- Romy Medeiros da Fonseca, et al. A Condição feminina. Organized and with an introduction by Nanci Valadares de Carvalho. São Paulo: Ed. Vértice, 1988. ISBN 8585068892
