= Emilia Soares de Patrocinio =

Brazilian slave, slave owner and businesswoman

Emilia Soares de Patrocinio (c. 1805–1886) was a Brazilian slave, slave owner and businesswoman.

She was born in western Africa, and came to Brazil as a victim of the Trans-Atlantic slave trade. In 1836, she is first noted as the slave of Teodora Maria do Patrocínio in Rio de Janeiro.

From an unknown date (at least from 1830 onward) she was active as market woman, selling vegetables on the square. She was successful and was able to buy her own freedom in 1839. The same year, she married the freedman Bernardo José Soares (d. 1846), who rented a stand and sold birds, vegetables, and other food. To become active in market trade was common for former slaves. She had three children with him. She took over her husband's business upon his death.

Emilia Soares de Patrocinio was a successful businesswoman who rented her own stand in the market and delivered food to the Imperial court of Brazil. A former slave, she became a slave owner herself, and had about ten slaves active in her business. In 1858, she is registered as the owner of nine slaves, with her own house, jewelry and other assets.
