= Jerônima Mesquita =

Brazilian feminist

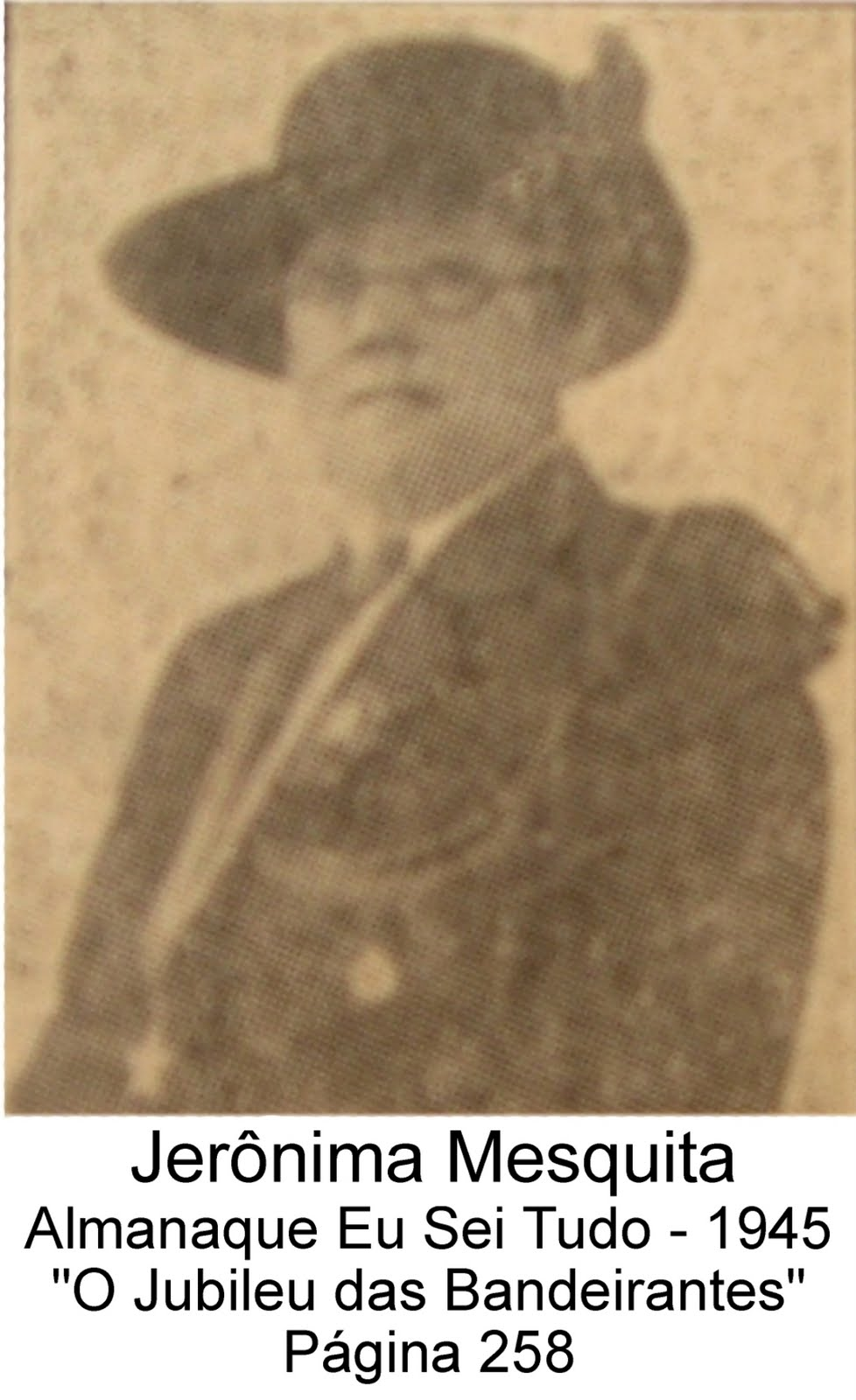
- Jeronima Mesquita

Personal details
- Born: 30 April 1880 Leopoldina, Minas Gerais, Brazil
- Died: 1972 (aged 91–92)

Jerônima Mesquita (30 April 1880 – 1972) was a Brazilian feminist. She is regarded as the pioneer of the women's movement in Brazil and co-founded the Federação Brasileira pelo Progresso Feminino with Berta Lutz and Stela Guerra Duval in 1922.
