= Federação Brasileira pelo Progresso Feminino =

Brazilian Federation for Women's Progress
- Federação Brasileira pelo Progresso Feminino
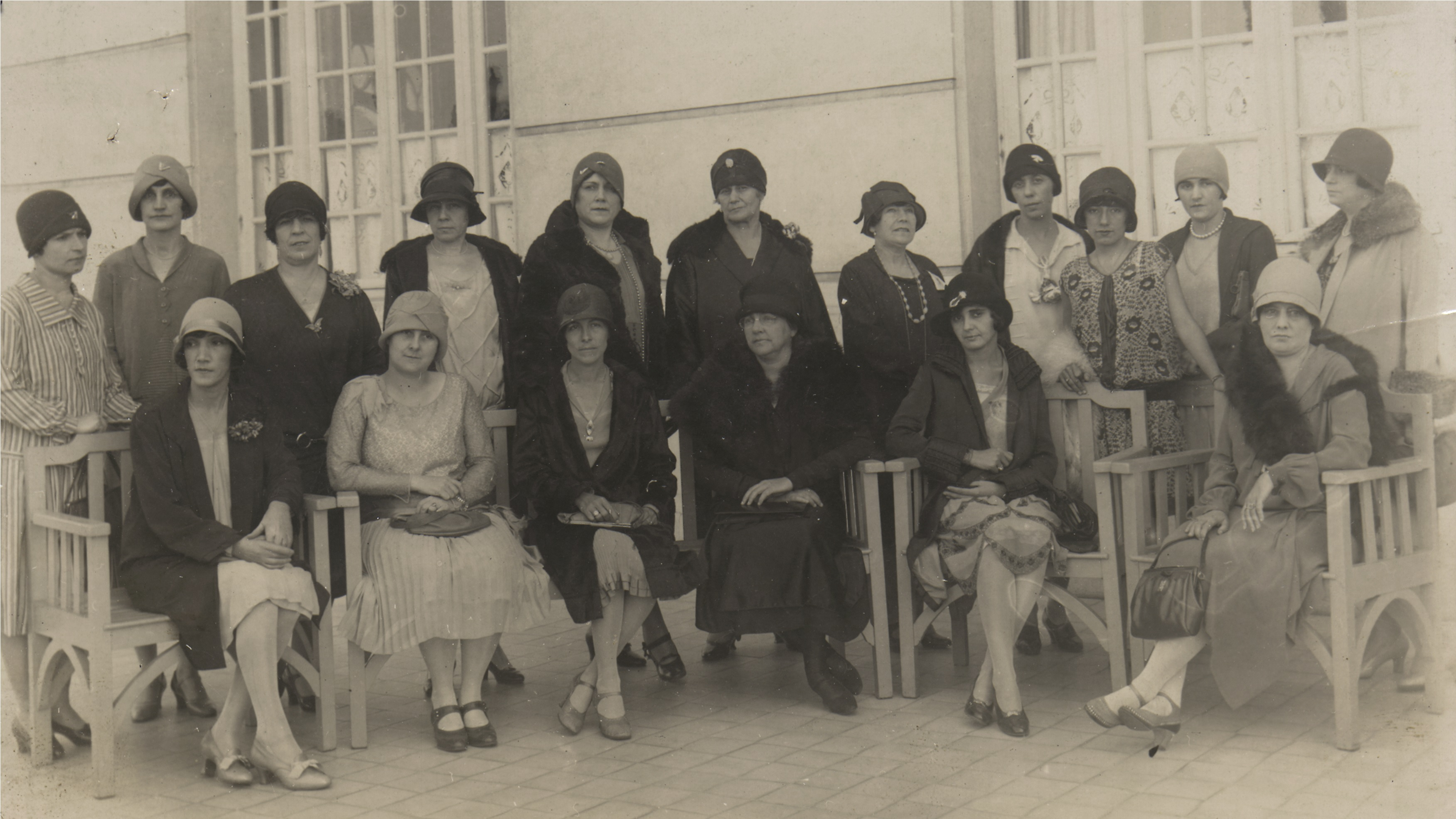
- Members of the Brazilian Federation for Women's Progress in 1930.
- Abbreviation: FBPF
- Predecessor: League for Women's Intellectual Emancipation
- Formation: 9 February 1922; 104 years ago
- Founders: Bertha Lutz; Isabel Imbassahy Chermont; Stella Guerra Duval; Jerônima Mesquita; Júlia Lopes de Almeida; Maria Lacerda de Moura
- Dissolved: 10 November 1937; 88 years ago
- Purpose: Women's rights
- Headquarters: Rio de Janeiro
- Location: Brazil
- President: Bertha Lutz
- Vice President: Jerônima Mesquita
- Affiliations: Pan-American Women's Association
- Formerly called: Brazilian League for Women's Progress

The Brazilian Federation for Women's Progress (Portuguese: Federação Brasileira pelo Progresso Feminino, FBPF) was a Brazilian women's rights organization founded on 9 August 1922 in Rio de Janeiro, mainly on the initiative of the Brazilian feminist leader Bertha Lutz. The FBPF is the heir of the League for Women's Intellectual Emancipation, founded in 1919 and dissolved in 1922 after Lutz's participation in the Pan-American Women's Conference, which established the Brazilian League for Women's Progress as an affiliate of the Pan-American Women's Association. In 1924, the organisation was renamed the Brazilian Federation for Women's Progress. During its most active years, the movement led a number of campaigns which saw the creation of the Women's University Union, the admission of girls to Colégio Pedro II, the extension of women's suffrage and the implementation of laws to protect women and children.

== Background ==
=== League for Women's Intellectual Emancipation ===
In 1919, the League for Women's Intellectual Emancipation was created, with the goals of defending women's rights and discussing issues related to the feminist movement. Its founders included Bertha Lutz, Isabel Imbassahy Chermont, Stella Guerra Duval, Jerônima Mesquita, Júlia Lopes de Almeida and Maria Lacerda de Moura.

Belonging to the Rio de Janeiro elite, the women who formed the League circulated among the powerful, which allowed them to present their demands and put pressure on the politicians of the time. This strategy was complemented with dissemination in the press and the organization of lectures on the causes they defended.

The League won a breakthrough for women's suffrage - a cause inherited by the Federation and won in 1932 - when Justo Chermont presented a project to the Senate that proposed allowing literate women over the age of 21 to vote. In 1921, the Constitution and Diplomacy Commission approved the project, but a second discussion on it was not held, blocking the resolution from being put into effect. Waiting for this meeting, Bertha became a constant pressure in Parliament and even became involved in drafting an amendment for women's suffrage and attending a meeting of the committee.

In February 1922, the league launched a manifesto regarding the elections taking place that year and asked women to campaign in favour of Nilo Peçanha and José Joaquim Seabra, candidates for the presidency and vice-presidency respectively. The former advocated for women's suffrage and was one of the deputies who had supported the cause since 1890.

=== International relations ===
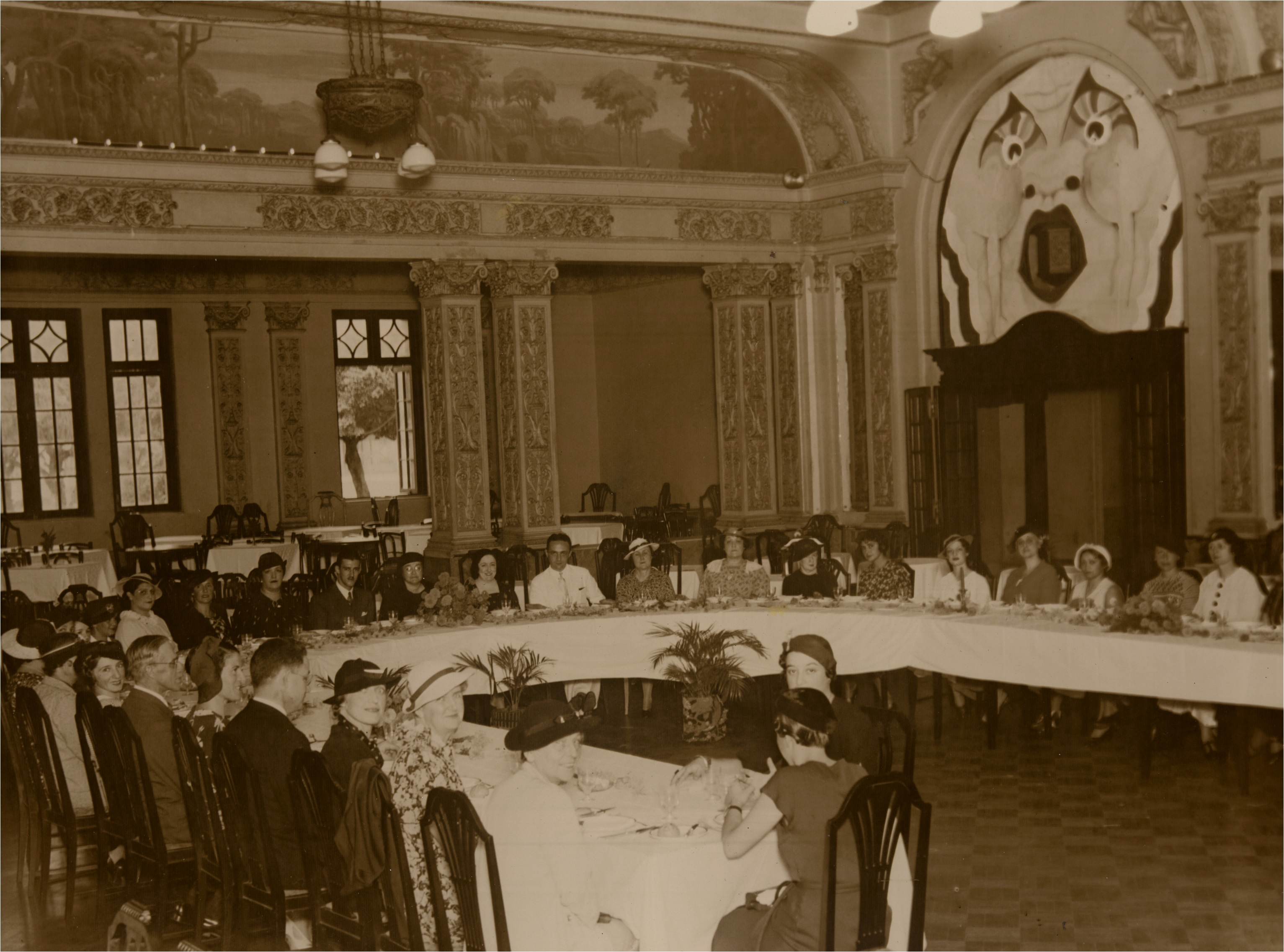
Pan-American lunch organised by the Brazilian Federation for Women's Progress.

With the goal of digging deeper into the issue and giving visibility to the League, Bertha Lutz built relationships with international feminist groups, including: the National Union of Societies for Equal Citizenship, International Woman Suffrage Alliance, Alianza Uruguaya para el Sufragio Feminino, Leslie Woman Suffrage Commission, National League of Women Voters and National American Woman Suffrage Association. In June 1922, Bertha represented Brazil at the 1st Pan-American Women's Conference. Her participation changed the course of the movement for women's political and civil rights.

The event took place in Baltimore, between 20 and 23 June 1922, and was attended by representatives from 22 countries. Based on the feminist experience in the United States, Bertha Lutz brought to the movement in Brazil another strategy that would help accelerate the conquest of rights by Brazilian women.

As a result of the meeting, the Pan-American Women's Association was formed and Bertha Lutz was chosen to be vice-president. In 1925, the group was renamed the Inter-American Women's Union and Lutz became president. Among the group's objectives were the improvement of women's education, legal protection for women, women's suffrage and bringing women from all countries of the American continent closer together. The members also took responsibility for founding national associations in their countries as well as state and municipal branches. This resulted in the end of the League for Women's Intellectual Emancipation and the emergence of the Brazilian League for Women's Progress, which became an affiliate of the Pan-American Association.

== Founding ==
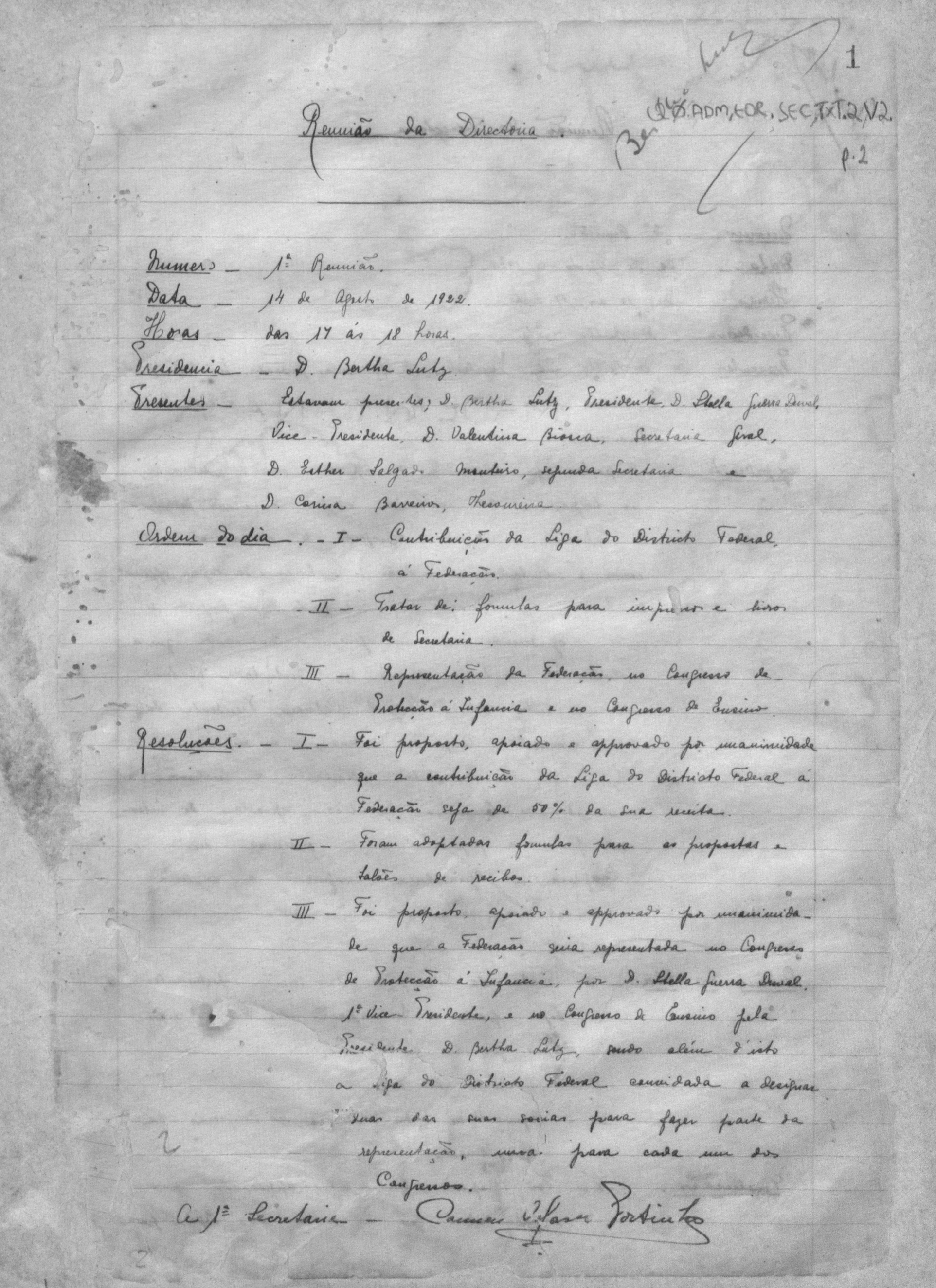
Minutes of the first Board Meeting.

The Brazilian League for Women's Progress was created on 9 February 1922 in Rio de Janeiro and aimed to coordinate and guide the work of qualifying women to participate in social life, whether domestic or public, intellectual or political. The movement aimed to:

- Promote the education of women in order to increase female instruction rates;
- Protect mothers and children;
- Achieve labor rights for women;
- Assist good initiatives and guide them towards the choice of a profession;
- Stimulating exchange and cooperation between women and involving them in social and public issues;
- To ensure women's political rights guaranteed by the constitution and prepare them to exercise these rights;
- To strengthen the bonds of friendship with other American countries in order to ensure the maintenance of peace on the continent.

In the same year, the League opened branches in São Paulo and Belo Horizonte. In December, the First Conference for Women's Progress took place and the League was renamed the Federation of Leagues for Women's Progress. In 1924, it finally became the Brazilian Federation for Women's Progress.

== Conference for Women's Progress ==
=== 1st Conference for Women's Progress (1922) ===
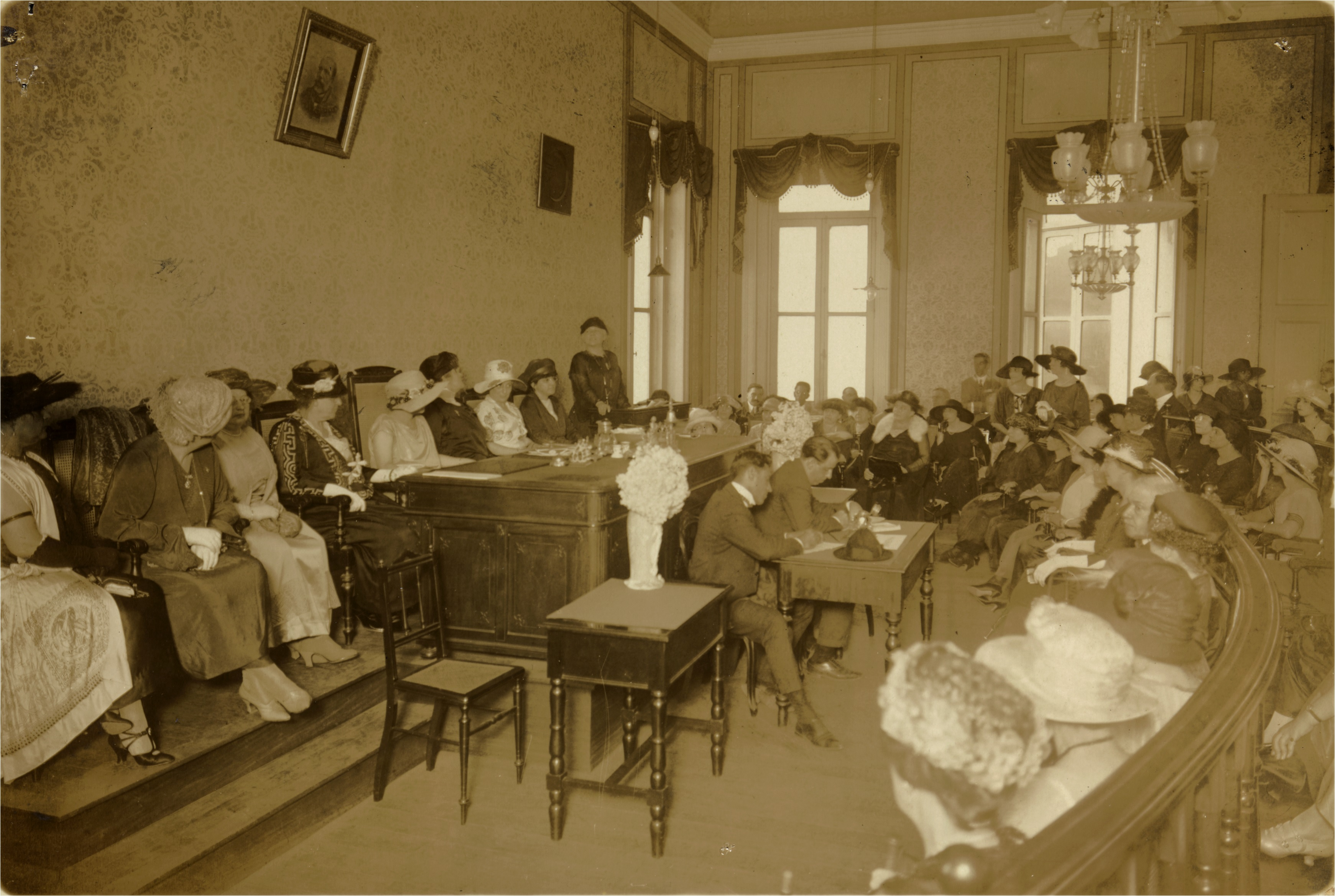
First Conference for Women's Progress organised by the FBPF in 1922.

Between 19 and 23 December 1922, the 1st Conference for Women's Progress took place in downtown Rio de Janeiro. The event was praised by the press and counted on the collaboration of the federal and state governments. It was attended by 25 delegates from the national federation, 24 delegates from the Federal District branch, 20 from the São Paulo branch, two from the Minas Gerais branch, and political men such as Lopes Gonçalves, Justo Chermont, Lauro Müller, Evaristo de Moraes and Estácio Coimbra.

The event had as one of its highlights the discussion on the political emancipation of women. Issues such as women's education and participation in the labor market were also addressed. Seven commissions were created to explore the issues in greater depth. They were: Instruction and Teaching; Careers and fields of activities appropriate to women; Women's work; Women's rights; Assistance and protection of mother and child; Organization and The role of women in civilization.

=== 2nd Conference for Women's Progress (1931) ===
Between 19 and 30 July 1931, the 2nd Conference for Women's Progress was held in Rio de Janeiro. This time, the focus of discussions were labor issues. Issues such as protection of mothers and childhood, education - with a focus on comprehensive education - and instruction for women were also debated.

== Achievements ==
In the Federation's campaign for the expansion of women's rights, among their greatest achievements were the universal female vote - won in 1932 - and access to education.

=== Women's University Union ===
Founded on 13 January 1929 by the Federation, its objective was to coordinate the efforts of women who had graduated or were enrolled in higher education in order to promote collaboration among them so that together they would defend their interests in the professions, develop the intellectuality of women in Brazil and contribute to the progress of women in the country. The University Union helped women who entered higher education to overcome barriers imposed by society. The group's actions stood out in law, engineering and science courses.

Federation members of the Union included Orminda Ribeiro Bastos (lawyer), Herminia de Assis (doctor), Myrthes de Campos (lawyer), Maria Alexandrina Ferreira Chaves (lawyer), Juana Lopes (doctor), Bertha Lutz (zoologist), Heloisa Marinho (professor), Carmen Portinho (civil engineer), Maria Ramalho (lawyer), Amélia Sapienza (civil engineer), Nathercia da Cunha Silveira (lawyer) and Emilia Snethlage (naturalist and ornithologist).

=== Admission of girls to the Colégio Pedro II ===
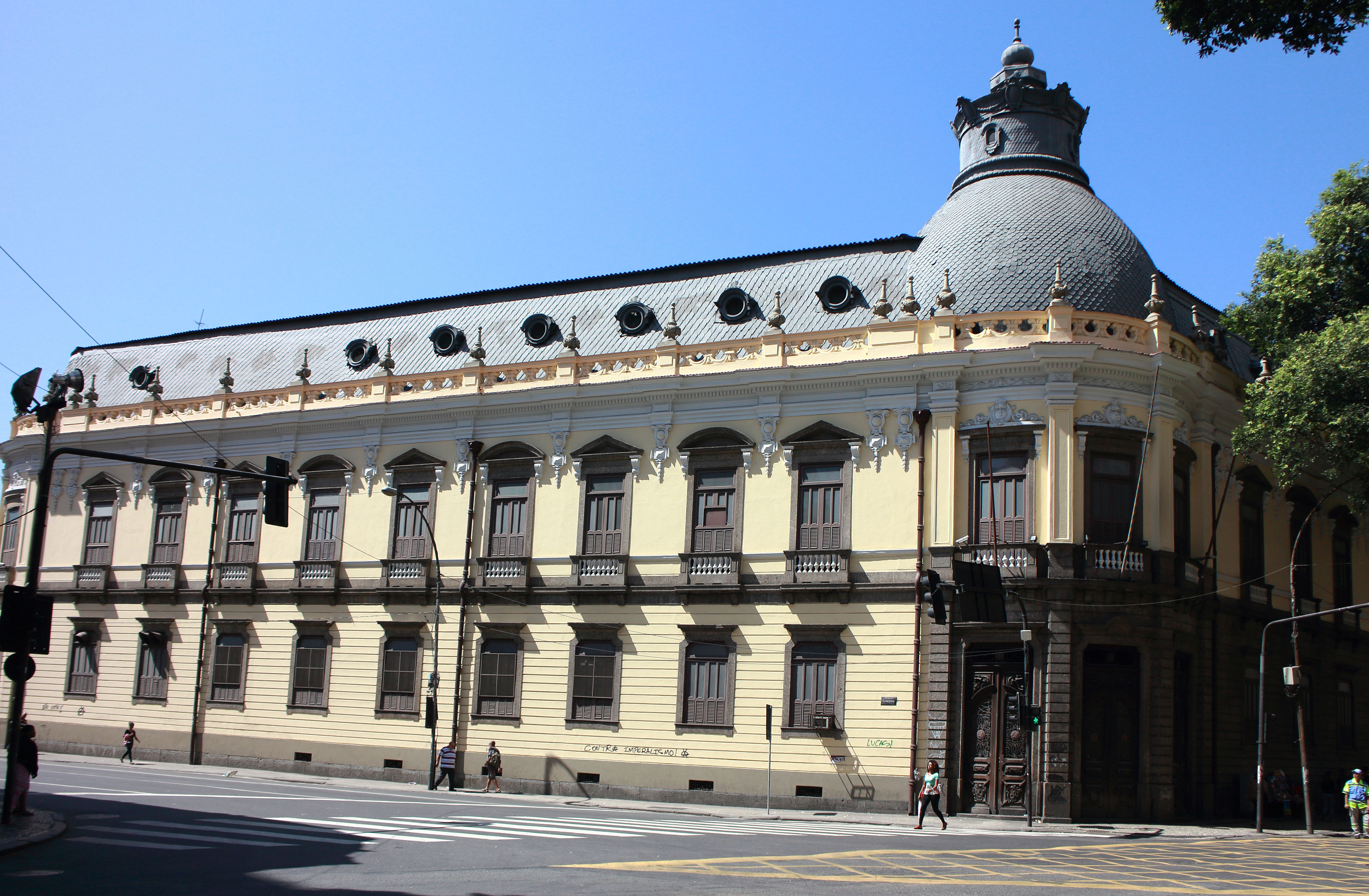
Colégio Pedro II.

Inaugurated in 1837, the traditional Pedro II College was intended for the education of male students and was seen as a model for the country, as it offered a level of instruction that guaranteed access to higher education and surpassed other secondary schools. In 1883, Dr. Candido Barata Ribeiro requested the enrolment in the first year of his two daughters and Senator Pedro Leão Velloso authorised their admission to the school. Other girls also entered the school in that period. In 1885, there were 15 students enrolled, of whom only one was in her final year. However, at the end of that year the admission of girls was forbidden due to lack of budget for an inspector to accompany the pupils. In 1889, all the girls were transferred to other schools considered "suitable for girls."

In 1922, during the First Conference for Women's Progress, in the Commission for Education and Instruction, the schooling of women was discussed. Bertha Lutz was one of those responsible for advocating the admission of girls to the Colégio Pedro II. She signed an indication that instructed the Conference to claim with the responsible authorities the admission of female students to secondary school. The Federation kept up the plea until, in 1926, Yvonne Monteiro da Silva was the first female student to enter the Colégio Pedro II since 1889. Since that moment the number of girls who were able to access the education offered by the federal institution gradually grew.

=== Women's suffrage ===
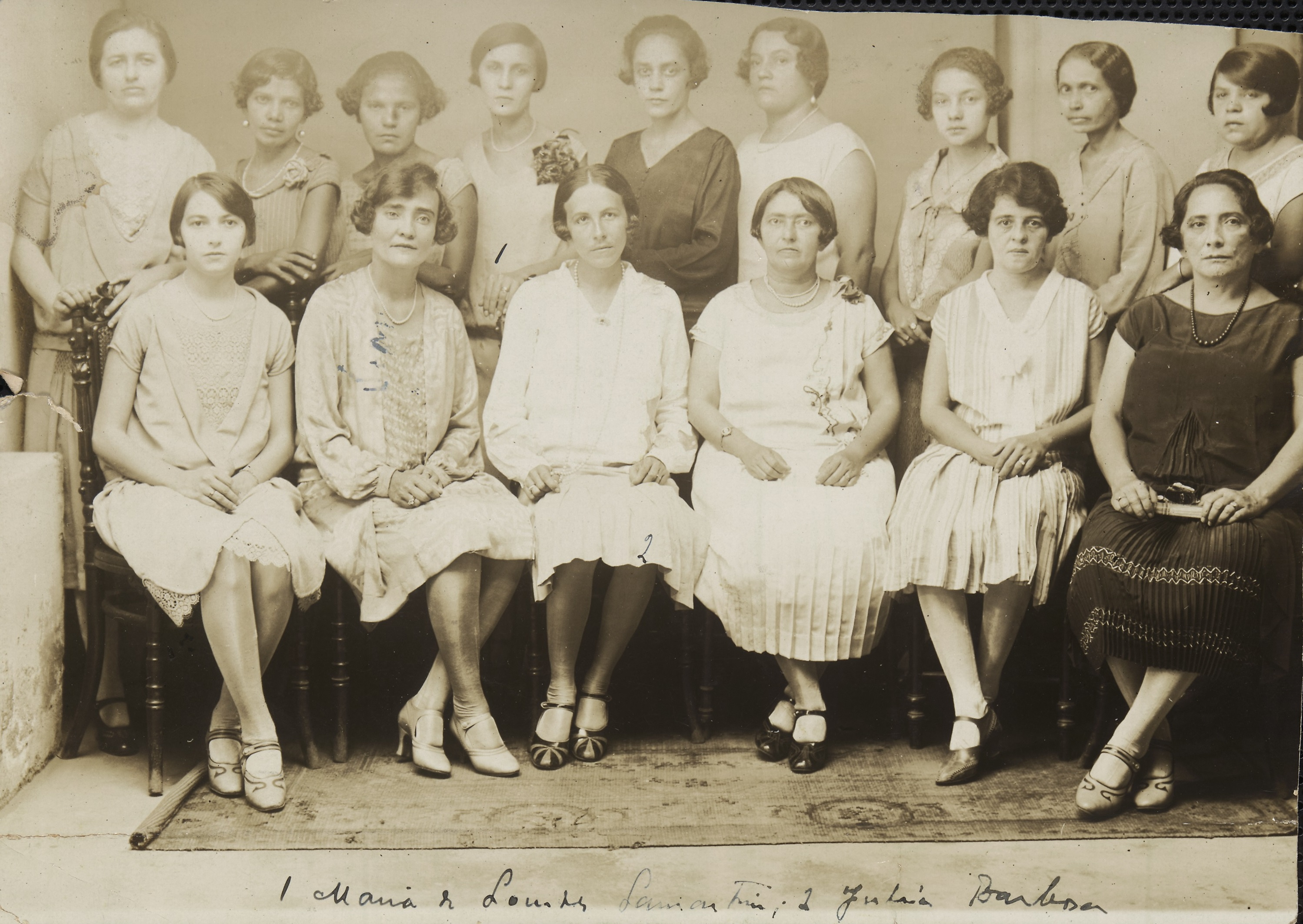
First Women Voters of Brazil. Natal, Rio Grande do Norte, 1928.

In 1922, during the First Conference for Women's Progress, one of the tables discussed women's suffrage. Participating in the discussion were the board of directors of the Federation and politicians in favour of women's suffrage, such as the vice-president of the Republic, Estácio Coimbra and senators Lopes Gonçalves and Lauro Müller. The event created a commotion in the press and in civil society, however it was not enough to constitute a support group within the Legislative power.

The first achievement was in 1927 when State Law No. 660 in Rio Grande do Norte extinguished the gender distinction for voters, allowing women to vote and be elected, as long as they were literate and over 21 years old. Fifteen women were elected during municipal elections in 1928, Alzira Soriano was elected mayor of Lajes, Júlia Alves Barbosa in Natal and Joana Cacilda de Bessa in Pau dos Ferros were elected to the position of municipal intendent. Subsequently, the Electoral Court of the state annulled the women's votes, but the episode strengthened the suffragist movements throughout the country. On 24 February 1932, Decree No. 21.076 instituted, in Article 2, that every citizen over 21 years old was to be an elector, regardless of gender, finally approving women's suffrage.

=== Protection for mothers ===
The Federation collaborated on the 1934 Constitution to institute a three-month maternity leave, with the right to a full salary, and the preference for women to lead institutions for the assistance of mothers and children. Among the proposals advocated that did not enter the Constitution was the creation of the Ministry of Maternity, Childhood and Home and the recognition of maternal rights.

The organisation was also concerned with overseeing compliance with the rights secured by the country's new constitution. In 1936, it called for the creation of a Women's Statute. In the same year, Bertha took office as a federal deputy and was appointed president of the Special Congressional Commission for the Women's Statute, which aimed to regulate the constitutional provisions protecting mothers and children. The preliminary draft created by the Commission provided for the formation of the Women's Department, which would be in charge of issues related to women's work and social assistance to women, mothers and children. However, the Statute did not come into force due to the dissolution of Congress in 1937 with the institution of the Estado Novo.

== Legacy ==
After the achievement of women's suffrage, the movement gradually disbanded and, with the institution of the Estado Novo on 10 November 1937, the Federation completely dissolved.

== Participants ==
Despite their cause theoretically involving all women, the Federation was made up mostly of women from the upper middle class. It was the structural organisation itself that made it difficult for women to participate widely, as the board of directors was responsible for appointing the vice-presidency and presidency - which was supposed to be changed every two years, but in practice the position was held by Bertha Lutz throughout the Federation's entire period of operation.

Board of Directors of the Brazilian Federation for Women's Progress in 1930
Position	Officeholder
President	Bertha Lutz
Vice-President	Jerônima Mesquita
2nd Vice-President	Maria Amalia Bastos de Miranda Jordão
General Secretary	Maria Esther Corrêa Ramalho
1st Secretary	Maria Amalia de Faria
2nd Secretary	Carmen de Carvalho
Treasurer	Carmen Velasco Portinho
Legal Consultant	Orminda Bastos

== Bibliography ==
- Araújo, Rita de Cássia Barbosa de (2003). "O voto de saias: a Constituinte de 1934 e a participação das mulheres na política". Estudos Avançados (in Portuguese). 17 (49): 133–150. doi:10.1590/S0103-40142003000300009. ISSN 0103-4014. OCLC 8255391082.
- Bonato, Nailda Marinho da Costa (2000). A presença feminina no Colégio Pedro II (PDF) (Thesis) (in Portuguese). Federal University of Rio de Janeiro. pp. 1–11. Archived from the original (PDF) on 30 November 2018.
- Bonato, Nailda Marinho da Costa; Coelho, Lígia Martha Coimbra da Costa (December 2007). "CONCEPÇÕES DE EDUCAÇÃO INTEGRAL NA DÉCADA DE 30: AS TESES DO II CONGRESSO INTERNACIONAL FEMINISTA-1931". Letras e Artes (in Portuguese). 15 (2). Ponta Grossa: State University of Ponta Grossa: 17–23. OCLC 667875572.
- Cardoso, Elizangela Barbosa (2012). "Em defesa da pátria: proteção social, infância e maternidade no Estado Novo". Revista Brasileira de História & Ciências Sociais (in Portuguese). 4 (8): 400–418.
- de Carvalho, Carmen (29 June 1930). "A Federação brasileira pelo progresso feminino e seus fins". Correio da Manha (in Portuguese).
- Coelho, Leila Machado; Baptista, Marisa (2009). "A história da inserção política da mulher no Brasil: uma trajetória do espaço privado ao público". Revista Psicologia Política (in Portuguese). 9 (17): 85–99.
- CPDOC. "FEDERAÇÃO BRASILEIRA PELO PROGRESSO FEMININO" (PDF) (in Portuguese). Centro de Pesquisa e Documentação de História Contemporânea do Brasil. pp. 1–2.
- Karawejczyk, Mônica (2018). "O Feminismo em Boa Marcha no Brasil! Bertha Lutz e a Conferência pelo Progresso Feminino". Revista Estudos Feminista (in Portuguese). 26 (2). Florianópolis: 1–17. doi:10.1590/1806-9584-2018v26n249845. ISSN 0104-026X. JSTOR 26538467. OCLC 7973905660. S2CID 149802366.
- Porto, Walter Costa (2000). "Voto da mulher". Dicionário do voto (in Portuguese). Brasília: University of Brasília. pp. 427–436. OCLC 685143870.
- Regis, Caren Victorino (2005). MULHERES DA UNIÃO UNIVERSITÁRIA FEMININA - 1929 (PDF) (Thesis) (in Portuguese). Federal University of the State of Rio de Janeiro. pp. 1–5. Archived from the original (PDF) on 1 December 2018.
- TRE-RN. Os 80 anos do voto de saias no Brasil (in Portuguese). Tribunal Regional Eleitoral do Rio Grande do Norte.
