= List of quilombola communities in Brazil =

The following list of quilombola communities in Brazil largely includes communities which have received certification as quilombola communities from the Palmares Cultural Foundation, as well as those which are not certified by the foundation but may have applied for certification. A far smaller number of the following communities have received land title as quilombola territories through the Instituto Nacional de Colonização e Reforma Agrária or equivalent state-level agencies.

== List ==
Região	Estado	Municípios	Comunidade Quilombola
Central-West	MS	Aquidauana	Furnas dos Baianos
Central-West	MS	Bonito	Águas do Miranda
Central-West	MS	Campo Grande	Chácara do Buriti
Central-West	MS	Campo Grande	São João Batista
Central-West	MS	Campo Grande	Tia Eva Maria de Jesus/ Tia Eva (Vila São Benedito)
Central-West	MS	Corguinho	Furnas da Boa Sorte
Central-West	MS	Corumbá	Campos Correia
Central-West	MS	Corumbá	Maria Theodora Gonçalves de Paula
Central-West	MS	Corumbá	Ribeirinha Família Osório
Central-West	MS	Dourados, Itaporã	Picadinha
Central-West	MS	Figueirão	Santa Tereza
Central-West	MS	Jaraguari	Furnas do Dionísio
Central-West	MS	Maracaju	Sao Miguel
Central-West	MS	Nioaque	Família Araújo e Ribeiro
Central-West	MS	Nioaque	Família Bulhões
Central-West	MS	Nioaque	Família Cardoso
Central-West	MS	Nioaque	Família Martins da Conceição
Central-West	MS	Pedro Gomes	Família Quintino
Central-West	MS	Rio Brilhante	Família Jarcem
Central-West	MS	Rio Negro	Orolândia
Central-West	MS	Sonora	Família Bispo
Central-West	MS	Terenos	Comunidade dos Pretos
Central-West	MT	Acorizal	Aldeias
Central-West	MT	Acorizal	Baús
Central-West	MT	Barra do Bugres	Água Doce
Central-West	MT	Barra do Bugres	Baixio
Central-West	MT	Barra do Bugres	Morro Redondo
Central-West	MT	Barra do Bugres	Vaca Morta
Central-West	MT	Barra do Bugres	Vermelhinho
Central-West	MT	Barra do Bugres, Porto Estrela	Vãozinho/Voltinha
Central-West	MT	Cáceres	Chapadinha
Central-West	MT	Cáceres	Exú
Central-West	MT	Cáceres	Monjolo
Central-West	MT	Cáceres	Pita Canudos
Central-West	MT	Cáceres	Ponta do Morro
Central-West	MT	Cáceres	Santana
Central-West	MT	Cáceres	São Gonçalo
Central-West	MT	Chapada dos Guimarães	Arica-Açú
Central-West	MT	Chapada dos Guimarães	Barro Preto Serra do Cambam Bi
Central-West	MT	Chapada dos Guimarães	Cachoeira do Bom Jardim
Central-West	MT	Chapada dos Guimarães	Cansanção
Central-West	MT	Chapada dos Guimarães	Itambé
Central-West	MT	Chapada dos Guimarães	Lagoinha de Baixo
Central-West	MT	Chapada dos Guimarães	Lagoinha de Cima
Central-West	MT	Cuiabá	Aguassú
Central-West	MT	Cuiabá	Caxipó Açú
Central-West	MT	Cuiabá	São Gerônimo
Central-West	MT	Nossa Senhora do Livramento	Barreiro
Central-West	MT	Nossa Senhora do Livramento	Cabeceira do Santana
Central-West	MT	Nossa Senhora do Livramento	Campina Verde
Central-West	MT	Nossa Senhora do Livramento	Entrada do Bananal
Central-West	MT	Nossa Senhora do Livramento	Jacaré de Cima
Central-West	MT	Nossa Senhora do Livramento	Comunidade Quilombola de Mata Cavalo (Mata Cavalo de Cima, Mata Cavalo de Baixo, Ribeirão do Mutuca, Aguassú, Ventura Capim Verde e Ourinhos)
Central-West	MT	Nossa Senhora do Livramento	Ribeirão da Mutuca
Central-West	MT	Novo Santo Antônio	Família Vieira Amorim
Central-West	MT	Poconé	Aranha
Central-West	MT	Poconé	Cágado
Central-West	MT	Poconé	Campina de Pedra
Central-West	MT	Poconé	Campina Ii
Central-West	MT	Poconé	Canto do Agostinho
Central-West	MT	Poconé	Capão Verde
Central-West	MT	Poconé	Carretão
Central-West	MT	Poconé	Céu Azul
Central-West	MT	Poconé	Chafariz Urubama
Central-West	MT	Poconé	Chumbo
Central-West	MT	Poconé	Coitinho
Central-West	MT	Poconé	Curralinho
Central-West	MT	Poconé	Imbé
Central-West	MT	Poconé	Jejum
Central-West	MT	Poconé	Laranjal
Central-West	MT	Poconé	Minadouro 2
Central-West	MT	Poconé	Morrinhos
Central-West	MT	Poconé	Morro Cortado
Central-West	MT	Poconé	Pantanalzinho
Central-West	MT	Poconé	Passagem de Carro
Central-West	MT	Poconé	Pedra Viva
Central-West	MT	Poconé	Retiro
Central-West	MT	Poconé	Rodeio
Central-West	MT	Poconé	São Benedito
Central-West	MT	Poconé	São Gonçalo Ii
Central-West	MT	Poconé	Sesmaria Fazenda Grande (Barreirão, Capão de Ouro, Carandá, Lagoa Grande, Manga e Passagem Velha)
Central-West	MT	Poconé	Sete Porcos
Central-West	MT	Poconé	Tanque do Padre Pinhal
Central-West	MT	Poconé	Varal
Central-West	MT	Porto Estrela	Bocaina
Central-West	MT	Santo Antônio do Leverger	Abolição
Central-West	MT	Santo Antônio do Leverger	Sesmaria Bigorna/Estiva
Central-West	MT	Várzea Grande	Capão do Negro Cristo Rei
Central-West	MT	Vila Bela da Santíssima Trindade	Bela Cor
Central-West	MT	Vila Bela da Santíssima Trindade	Boqueirão, Vale do Rio Alegre e Vale do Rio Guaporé
Central-West	MT	Vila Bela da Santíssima Trindade	Capão do Negro
Central-West	MT	Vila Bela da Santíssima Trindade	Manga
Central-West	MT	Vila Bela da Santíssima Trindade	Vale do Alegre
Northeast	AL	Água Branca	Barro Preto
Northeast	AL	Água Branca	Lagoa das Pedras
Northeast	AL	Água Branca	Povoado Cal
Northeast	AL	Água Branca	Povoado de Moreira de Baixo
Northeast	AL	Água Branca	Serra das Viúvas
Northeast	AL	Água Branca	Sítio Queimadas
Northeast	AL	Anadia	Jaqueira
Northeast	AL	Arapiraca	Carrasco
Northeast	AL	Arapiraca	Pau d'Arco
Northeast	AL	Batalha	Cajá dos Negros
Northeast	AL	Belém	Serra dos Bangas
Northeast	AL	Cacimbinhas	Guaxinin
Northeast	AL	Canapi	Mumdumpin
Northeast	AL	Canapi	Serra Alto de Negras
Northeast	AL	Canapi	Tupete
Northeast	AL	Carneiros	Lagoa do Algodão
Northeast	AL	Delmiro Gouveia	Povoado Cruz
Northeast	AL	Igaci	Sítio Serra Verde
Northeast	AL	Igreja Nova	Palmeira dos Negros
Northeast	AL	Igreja Nova	Sapé
Northeast	AL	Jacaré dos Homens	Alto da Madeira
Northeast	AL	Jacaré dos Homens	Baixas
Northeast	AL	Jacaré dos Homens	Poções
Northeast	AL	Jacaré dos Homens	Ribeiras
Northeast	AL	Japaratinga	Macuca
Northeast	AL	Major Isidoro	Puxinanã
Northeast	AL	Mata Grande	Saco dos Mirandas
Northeast	AL	Monteirópolis	Paus Pretos
Northeast	AL	Olho d'Água das Flores	Aguazinha
Northeast	AL	Olho d'Água das Flores	Gameleiro
Northeast	AL	Olho d'Água das Flores	Guarani
Northeast	AL	Olho d'Água do Casado	Alto da Boa Vista
Northeast	AL	Palestina	Santa Filomena
Northeast	AL	Palestina	Vila Santo Antônio
Northeast	AL	Palmeira dos Índios	Povoado Tabacaria
Northeast	AL	Pão de Açúcar	Chifre do Bode
Northeast	AL	Pão de Açúcar	Poço do Sal
Northeast	AL	Pariconha	Burnil
Northeast	AL	Pariconha	Malhada Vermelha
Northeast	AL	Pariconha	Melancia
Northeast	AL	Passo de Camaragibe	Bom Despacho
Northeast	AL	Passo de Camaragibe	Perpetua
Northeast	AL	Penedo	Oiteiro
Northeast	AL	Penedo	Tabuleiro dos Negros
Northeast	AL	Piaçabuçu	Pixaim
Northeast	AL	Piranhas	Sítio Lages
Northeast	AL	Poço das Trincheiras	Alto do Tamanduá
Northeast	AL	Poço das Trincheiras	Jacu e Mocó
Northeast	AL	Poço das Trincheiras	Jorge
Northeast	AL	Santa Luzia do Norte	Quilombo
Northeast	AL	Santana do Mundaú	Filus
Northeast	AL	Santana do Mundaú	Jussarinha
Northeast	AL	Santana do Mundaú	Mariana
Northeast	AL	São José da Tapera	Caboclo
Northeast	AL	São José da Tapera	Cacimba do Barro
Northeast	AL	Senador Rui Palmeira	Serrinha dos Cocos
Northeast	AL	Taquarana	Lagoa do Coxo
Northeast	AL	Taquarana	Mameluco
Northeast	AL	Taquarana	Passagem do Vigário
Northeast	AL	Taquarana	Poços do Lunga
Northeast	AL	Teotônio Vilela	Abobreiras
Northeast	AL	Teotônio Vilela	Birrus
Northeast	AL	Traipu	Mumbaça
Northeast	AL	Traipu	Sítio Belo Horizonte
Northeast	AL	Traipu	Sítio Tabuleiro
Northeast	AL	Traipu	Uruçu
Northeast	AL	União dos Palmares	Muquém
Northeast	AL	Viçosa	Gurgumba
Northeast	AL	Viçosa	Sabalangá
Northeast	BA	Abaíra	Alto da Boa Vista
Northeast	BA	Abaíra	Assento
Northeast	BA	Abaíra	Barra de Catolés
Northeast	BA	Abaré	Fazenda Curral da Pedra, Julião, Tuiuiú, Pedra da Onça e Piranha
Northeast	BA	Água Fria	Curral de Fora
Northeast	BA	Alagoinhas	Fazenda Cangula
Northeast	BA	Alagoinhas	Fazenda Oiteiro
Northeast	BA	Alagoinhas, Aramari	Catuzinho
Northeast	BA	Amélia Rodrigues	Pinguela
Northeast	BA	América Dourada	Alegre
Northeast	BA	América Dourada	Barriguda dos Bidós
Northeast	BA	América Dourada	Boa Esperança
Northeast	BA	América Dourada	Boa Vista
Northeast	BA	América Dourada	Campo Alegre
Northeast	BA	América Dourada	Canabrava
Northeast	BA	América Dourada	Garapa
Northeast	BA	América Dourada	Lagoa Verde (Lagoa Verde, Lagoa Verde de Baia e Queimada Nova dos Vianas)
Northeast	BA	América Dourada	Lajedão dos Mateus
Northeast	BA	América Dourada	Lapinha
Northeast	BA	América Dourada	Mulungu
Northeast	BA	América Dourada	Prevenido
Northeast	BA	América Dourada	Queimada dos Beneditos
Northeast	BA	América Dourada	Sarandí
Northeast	BA	Anagé	Água Doce
Northeast	BA	Anagé	Lagoa Torta dos Pretos
Northeast	BA	Anagé	Mandacaru
Northeast	BA	Andaraí	Fazenda Velha
Northeast	BA	Antas	Raso Veloso
Northeast	BA	Antônio Cardoso	Gavião, Cavaco e Paus Altos
Northeast	BA	Antônio Cardoso	Orobó, Salgado e Morro da Pindoba
Northeast	BA	Antônio Cardoso	Santo Antônio
Northeast	BA	Antônio Cardoso	Subaé
Northeast	BA	Antônio Gonçalves	Bananeira dos Pretos
Northeast	BA	Antônio Gonçalves	Conceição
Northeast	BA	Antônio Gonçalves	Jibóia
Northeast	BA	Antônio Gonçalves	Macaco de Cima
Northeast	BA	Araças	Areia Branca (Barro, Brocotó, Corocas, Dois Riachos de Cima, Fazenda Sesmaria, Flores, Jatobá, Ladeira, Mandacaru, Oitis, Pau d'Arco, Pedra d'Água, Pedra Furada, Pega, Porção, Quirico Grande, Quiricozinho, São Pedro, Sapé I, Sapé Ii e Viração
Northeast	BA	Araças	Azulão (Baixa da Raposa, Biriba, Boa Esperança, Burizeiro, Caboronga, Cajazeiras, Calçada, Capianga, Catana, Chapada, Fazenda Retiro, Fazenda São Mateus, Floresta, Jenipapo, Mamão, Mato Limpo, Passarinho, Rio Preto e Viva Deus)
Northeast	BA	Araças	Fazenda Cruzeiro
Northeast	BA	Araças	Gaioso
Northeast	BA	Araças	Jurema
Northeast	BA	Araças	Pé de Serra
Northeast	BA	Aramari	Olhos d' Água
Northeast	BA	Aurelino Leal	Fazenda Minerva
Northeast	BA	Banzaê	Baixão Ii e Piauí
Northeast	BA	Banzaê	Maria Preta
Northeast	BA	Banzaê	Terra da Lua
Northeast	BA	Barra	Curralinho
Northeast	BA	Barra	Igarité
Northeast	BA	Barra	Juá
Northeast	BA	Barra	Pedra Negra da Extrema
Northeast	BA	Barra	Torrinha
Northeast	BA	Barra da Estiva	Camulengo
Northeast	BA	Barra da Estiva	Ginete
Northeast	BA	Barra da Estiva	Moitinha
Northeast	BA	Barra do Mendes	Antarí
Northeast	BA	Barra do Mendes	Canarina
Northeast	BA	Barra do Mendes	Queimada do Rufino
Northeast	BA	Barra do Mendes	Volta do Ábdon
Northeast	BA	Barreiras	Mucambo
Northeast	BA	Barro Alto	Barreirinho
Northeast	BA	Barro Alto	Malvinas
Northeast	BA	Barro Alto	Segredo
Northeast	BA	Barro Alto	Volta Grande
Northeast	BA	Belo Campo	Bomba
Northeast	BA	Biritinga	Trindade
Northeast	BA	Biritinga	Vila Nova
Northeast	BA	Bom Jesus da Lapa	Araçá, Cariaca, Coxo, Retiro, Patos e Pedra
Northeast	BA	Bom Jesus da Lapa	Bandeira
Northeast	BA	Bom Jesus da Lapa	Barrinha
Northeast	BA	Bom Jesus da Lapa	Bebedouro
Northeast	BA	Bom Jesus da Lapa	Fortaleza
Northeast	BA	Bom Jesus da Lapa	Juá
Northeast	BA	Bom Jesus da Lapa	Lagoa das Piranhas
Northeast	BA	Bom Jesus da Lapa	Lagoa do Peixe
Northeast	BA	Bom Jesus da Lapa	Peroba
Northeast	BA	Bom Jesus da Lapa, Malhada	Nova Batalhinha
Northeast	BA	Bom Jesus da Lapa, Malhada, Riacho de Santana	Rio das Rãs
Northeast	BA	Bom Jesus da Serra	Mumbuca e Samambaia
Northeast	BA	Boninal	Conceição
Northeast	BA	Boninal	Cutia
Northeast	BA	Boninal	Mulungu
Northeast	BA	Boninal	Olhos d'Águinha
Northeast	BA	Bonito	Arizona
Northeast	BA	Bonito	Baixa do Cheiro
Northeast	BA	Bonito	Baixa Vistosa
Northeast	BA	Bonito	Baliza
Northeast	BA	Bonito	Botafogo
Northeast	BA	Bonito	Cabeceira do Brejo
Northeast	BA	Bonito	Catuabinha
Northeast	BA	Bonito	Gitirana
Northeast	BA	Bonito	Gramiar
Northeast	BA	Bonito	Guarani
Northeast	BA	Bonito	Mata Florença
Northeast	BA	Bonito	Quixabá
Northeast	BA	Bonito	Ribeiro
Northeast	BA	Bonito	Rio das Lages
Northeast	BA	Bonito	Varame
Northeast	BA	Brejolândia, Muquém de São Francisco, Sítio do Mato	Jatobá
Northeast	BA	Buritirama	Riacho do Meio
Northeast	BA	Caatiba	Jussara
Northeast	BA	Cachoeira	Brejo do Engenho da Guaíba
Northeast	BA	Cachoeira	Caimbongo
Northeast	BA	Cachoeira	Calolé, Imbiara e Tombo
Northeast	BA	Cachoeira	Caonge, Dendê, Engenho da Ponte, Engenho da Praia e Kalemba
Northeast	BA	Cachoeira	Engenho da Cruz
Northeast	BA	Cachoeira	Engenho da Vitoria
Northeast	BA	Cachoeira	Engenho Novo do Vale do Iguape
Northeast	BA	Cachoeira	Mutecho e Acutinga
Northeast	BA	Cachoeira	São Francisco do Paraguaçu
Northeast	BA	Cachoeira	São Tiago do Iguapé
Northeast	BA	Cachoeira	Tabuleiro da Vitória
Northeast	BA	Caém	Bom Jardim
Northeast	BA	Caém	Monteiro
Northeast	BA	Caém	Pau Seco
Northeast	BA	Caém, Capim Grosso	Várzea Queimada
Northeast	BA	Caetité	Cangalha
Northeast	BA	Caetité	Contendas
Northeast	BA	Caetité	Lagoa do Mato
Northeast	BA	Caetité	Lagoa do Meio
Northeast	BA	Caetité	Lagoinha da Cobra
Northeast	BA	Caetité	Malhada
Northeast	BA	Caetité	Mercês
Northeast	BA	Caetité	Olho d'Àgua
Northeast	BA	Caetité	Passagem de Areia
Northeast	BA	Caetité	Pau Ferro
Northeast	BA	Caetité	Sambaíba
Northeast	BA	Caetité	Sapé
Northeast	BA	Caetité	Vargem do Sal
Northeast	BA	Caetité	Vereda do Cais
Northeast	BA	Cafarnaum	Bandeira, Salaminho e Umbuzeiro
Northeast	BA	Cafarnaum	Presídio, Charel, Curralinho e Roça do Meio
Northeast	BA	Cafarnaum	Queimada do Tiano, Erva Cidreira e Lagoa do Gado
Northeast	BA	Cairu	Batateira
Northeast	BA	Cairu	Cajazeiras, Prata e Rua de Fogo
Northeast	BA	Cairu	Galeão
Northeast	BA	Cairu	Guarapuá
Northeast	BA	Cairu	Torrinhas
Northeast	BA	Cairu	Vila Monte Alegre
Northeast	BA	Caldeirão Grande	Raposa
Northeast	BA	Camaçari	Cordoaria
Northeast	BA	Camamu	Acaraí
Northeast	BA	Camamu	Barroso
Northeast	BA	Camamu	Garcia
Northeast	BA	Camamu	Jetimana
Northeast	BA	Camamu	Pedra Rasa
Northeast	BA	Camamu	Pimenteira
Northeast	BA	Camamu	Porto do Campo
Northeast	BA	Camamu	Pratigi
Northeast	BA	Camamu	Ronco
Northeast	BA	Camamu	Tapuia
Northeast	BA	Campo Formoso	Alagadiço de Lage dos Negros
Northeast	BA	Campo Formoso	Barrocas
Northeast	BA	Campo Formoso	Bebedouro
Northeast	BA	Campo Formoso	Buraco
Northeast	BA	Campo Formoso	Casa Nova dos Amaros
Northeast	BA	Campo Formoso	Casa Nova dos Ferreira
Northeast	BA	Campo Formoso	Casa Nova dos Marinos
Northeast	BA	Campo Formoso	Gameleira do Dida
Northeast	BA	Campo Formoso	Lage dos Negros
Northeast	BA	Campo Formoso	Lagoa Branca
Northeast	BA	Campo Formoso	Laje de Cima Ii
Northeast	BA	Campo Formoso	Paquí
Northeast	BA	Campo Formoso	Patos I
Northeast	BA	Campo Formoso	Patos Ii
Northeast	BA	Campo Formoso	Patos Iii
Northeast	BA	Campo Formoso	Pedra
Northeast	BA	Campo Formoso	Poço da Pedra
Northeast	BA	Campo Formoso	Sangradouro I
Northeast	BA	Campo Formoso	Sangradouro Ii
Northeast	BA	Campo Formoso	São Tomé
Northeast	BA	Campo Formoso	Saquinho
Northeast	BA	Canarana	Brejinho
Northeast	BA	Canarana	Cansanção
Northeast	BA	Canarana	Cruzeiro
Northeast	BA	Canarana	Floresta I
Northeast	BA	Canarana	Floresta Ii
Northeast	BA	Canarana	Lagoa do Zeca
Northeast	BA	Canarana	Largo dos Mirandas
Northeast	BA	Canarana	Mato Verde
Northeast	BA	Canarana	Novo Horizonte
Northeast	BA	Canarana	Segredo
Northeast	BA	Canarana	Volta do Angico
Northeast	BA	Candeias	Boca Rio - Aratu
Northeast	BA	Candiba	Lagoa dos Anjos
Northeast	BA	Cansanção	Jatobá
Northeast	BA	Cansanção	Tamanduá
Northeast	BA	Capim Grosso	Cambueiro, Barro Vermelho e Volta
Northeast	BA	Caravelas	Mutum
Northeast	BA	Caravelas	Naiá
Northeast	BA	Caravelas	Volta Miúda
Northeast	BA	Carinhanha	Barra do Parateca
Northeast	BA	Carinhanha	Estreito
Northeast	BA	Casa Nova	Lagoinha
Northeast	BA	Central	Caldeirãozinho
Northeast	BA	Central	Capoeira da Serra
Northeast	BA	Central	Caroá
Northeast	BA	Central	Floresta
Northeast	BA	Central	Lagoa do Martinho
Northeast	BA	Central	Mandacarus
Northeast	BA	Central	Milho Verde
Northeast	BA	Central	Morro de Lúcio
Northeast	BA	Central	São João de Zé de Preta
Northeast	BA	Central	Vereda
Northeast	BA	Cipó	Caboge
Northeast	BA	Cipó	Rua do Jorro
Northeast	BA	Cipó	Várzea Grande
Northeast	BA	Cocos	Cajueiro e Samambaia
Northeast	BA	Conceição da Feira	Bete I e Gameleira
Northeast	BA	Conceição do Coité	Maracujá
Northeast	BA	Conde	Burí
Northeast	BA	Conde	Pedra Grande
Northeast	BA	Condeúba	Passagem do Meio
Northeast	BA	Condeúba	Sape, Sossego e Guariba
Northeast	BA	Condeúba	Tamboril
Northeast	BA	Contendas do Sincorá	São Gonçalo
Northeast	BA	Coração de Maria	Engenho da Raiz Mangalô
Northeast	BA	Cruz das Almas	Baixa da Linha
Northeast	BA	Cruz das Almas	Vila Guaxinin
Northeast	BA	Curaçá	Nova Jatobá
Northeast	BA	Encruzilhada	Brejinho
Northeast	BA	Entre Rios	Cidade Nova
Northeast	BA	Entre Rios	Dos Pedros
Northeast	BA	Entre Rios	Fazenda Porteiras
Northeast	BA	Entre Rios	Gamba
Northeast	BA	Entre Rios	Limoeiro
Northeast	BA	Entre Rios	Massarandupió
Northeast	BA	Érico Cardoso	Paramirim das Creolas
Northeast	BA	Esplanada	Mucambinho
Northeast	BA	Esplanada	Timbó
Northeast	BA	Fátima	Serradinha
Northeast	BA	Feira de Santana	Fazenda Candeal Ii
Northeast	BA	Feira de Santana	Lagoa Grande
Northeast	BA	Feira de Santana	Matinha dos Pretos
Northeast	BA	Filadélfia	Aguadas
Northeast	BA	Filadélfia	Barreira da Pedra I e Ii
Northeast	BA	Filadélfia	Barreiras
Northeast	BA	Filadélfia	Cabeça da Vaca I
Northeast	BA	Filadélfia	Cachimbo
Northeast	BA	Filadélfia	Cajá
Northeast	BA	Filadélfia	Cana Fista
Northeast	BA	Filadélfia	Fazenda Gado Bravo e Adjacências
Northeast	BA	Filadélfia	Gavião
Northeast	BA	Filadélfia	Gravatá
Northeast	BA	Filadélfia	Macaco de Baixo
Northeast	BA	Filadélfia	Massaroca
Northeast	BA	Filadélfia	Muquém
Northeast	BA	Filadélfia	Papagaio
Northeast	BA	Filadélfia	Patos
Northeast	BA	Filadélfia	Raposa
Northeast	BA	Filadélfia	Riachão
Northeast	BA	Filadélfia	Riacho das Pedrinhas
Northeast	BA	Filadélfia	Riacho do Silva e Junco
Northeast	BA	Filadélfia	Várzea da Serra
Northeast	BA	Filadélfia	Morrinhos
Northeast	BA	Formosa do Rio Preto	Buritizinho/Barra do Brejo
Northeast	BA	Gentio do Ouro	Água Doce
Northeast	BA	Gentio do Ouro	Alagoinhas
Northeast	BA	Gentio do Ouro	Barreiro Preto
Northeast	BA	Gentio do Ouro	Gregório e Silvério
Northeast	BA	Gentio do Ouro	Malhada e Olho d'Água
Northeast	BA	Gentio do Ouro	Mato Grosso
Northeast	BA	Gentio do Ouro	Pacheco
Northeast	BA	Guanambi	Morro de Dentro
Northeast	BA	Guanambi	Queimadas
Northeast	BA	Ibiassucê	Santo Inácio
Northeast	BA	Ibipeba	Aleixo
Northeast	BA	Ibipeba	Lagedinho
Northeast	BA	Ibipeba	Lagoa do Cedro
Northeast	BA	Ibipeba	Mocobeu
Northeast	BA	Ibipeba	Muribeca, Abade e Santo Antônio
Northeast	BA	Ibipeba	Olho d'Água do Badu
Northeast	BA	Ibipeba	Olhos d'Água dos Batatas
Northeast	BA	Ibipeba	Salva Vidas
Northeast	BA	Ibipeba	São Vicente
Northeast	BA	Ibipeba	Segredo
Northeast	BA	Ibipeba	Serra Grande
Northeast	BA	Ibipitanga	Castanhão
Northeast	BA	Ibirapuã	Vila Juazeiro
Northeast	BA	Ibitiara	Cana Brava
Northeast	BA	Ibitiara	Capão
Northeast	BA	Ibitiara	Caraíbas
Northeast	BA	Ibitiara	Olho d'Água Novo
Northeast	BA	Ibitiara	Riachão
Northeast	BA	Ibitiara	Tiririca de Cima
Northeast	BA	Ibitiara	Vila Nova
Northeast	BA	Ibitiara, Seabra	Morro Redondo
Northeast	BA	Ibititá	Bairro da Mata
Northeast	BA	Ibititá	Barro Duro
Northeast	BA	Ibititá	Batata
Northeast	BA	Ibititá	Canoão
Northeast	BA	Ibititá	Faveleiro
Northeast	BA	Ibititá	Lagedão
Northeast	BA	Ibititá	Lagoa da Pedra
Northeast	BA	Ibititá	Pedra Lisa
Northeast	BA	Ibotirama	Saco Grande de Tixinha
Northeast	BA	Igaporã	Gurunga
Northeast	BA	Igaporã	Lapinha
Northeast	BA	Igaporã	Passagem da Pedra
Northeast	BA	Igrapiúna	Amba
Northeast	BA	Igrapiúna	Laranjeiras
Northeast	BA	Igrapiúna	Sapucaia
Northeast	BA	Igrapiúna	Pedra Branca, Vargido e Forte
Northeast	BA	Ilhéus	Morro do Miriqui e Alto Terra Nova
Northeast	BA	Iraquara	Mato Preto
Northeast	BA	Iraquara	Meio Centro
Northeast	BA	Iraquara	Povoado dos Morenos
Northeast	BA	Iraquara	Povoado Escôncio
Northeast	BA	Iraquara	Riacho do Mel
Northeast	BA	Irará	Baixinha
Northeast	BA	Irará	Massaranduba
Northeast	BA	Irará	Olaria e Pedra Branca
Northeast	BA	Irará	Tapera Melão
Northeast	BA	Irecê	Baixão de Zé Preto
Northeast	BA	Irecê	Lagoa Nova
Northeast	BA	Itacaré	Água Vermelha
Northeast	BA	Itacaré	Fojo
Northeast	BA	Itacaré	João Rodrigues
Northeast	BA	Itacaré	Porto de Trás
Northeast	BA	Itacaré	Porto do Oitizeiro
Northeast	BA	Itacaré	Santo Amaro
Northeast	BA	Itacaré	Serra de Água
Northeast	BA	Itaetê	Bananeiras
Northeast	BA	Itaguaçu da Bahia	Alegre e Barreiros
Northeast	BA	Itaguaçu da Bahia	Alto Bebedouro
Northeast	BA	Itaguaçu da Bahia	Cajueiro
Northeast	BA	Itamari	Bananal
Northeast	BA	Itamari	Nova Ponte
Northeast	BA	Itambé	Pedra
Northeast	BA	Itanhém	Mota
Northeast	BA	Itatim	Entre Morro
Northeast	BA	Itororó	Rua de Palha
Northeast	BA	Ituaçú	Chapadinha, Duas Barras e Baixa Funda
Northeast	BA	Ituaçú	Lagoa da Lage
Northeast	BA	Ituberá	Brejo Grande e Curral da Pedra
Northeast	BA	Ituberá	Cágados
Northeast	BA	Ituberá	Ingazeira
Northeast	BA	Ituberá	Lagoa Santa
Northeast	BA	Ituberá	São João de Santa Bárbara
Northeast	BA	Jacobina	Bananeira
Northeast	BA	Jacobina	Baraúnas de Dentro
Northeast	BA	Jacobina	Barracão Velho
Northeast	BA	Jacobina	Cafelândia
Northeast	BA	Jacobina	Campestre
Northeast	BA	Jacobina	Coreia
Northeast	BA	Jacobina	Lages do Batata
Northeast	BA	Jacobina	Lagoa do Timbó
Northeast	BA	Jacobina	Lázaro do Timbó
Northeast	BA	Jacobina	Malhadinha de Dentro
Northeast	BA	Jaguaquara	Ocrídio Pereira
Northeast	BA	Jequié	Barro Preto
Northeast	BA	Jeremoabo	Baixa da Lagoa, Olhos D’agua e Quelés
Northeast	BA	Jeremoabo	Casinhas
Northeast	BA	Jeremoabo	Juazeiro dos Capotes
Northeast	BA	Jeremoabo	Sítio Alagoinhas, Adriana e Bananeirinha
Northeast	BA	Jeremoabo	Viração e Siriquinha
Northeast	BA	João Dourado	Angicão
Northeast	BA	João Dourado	Baixa das Cabaças
Northeast	BA	João Dourado	Descoberta
Northeast	BA	João Dourado	Feitosa
Northeast	BA	João Dourado	Lagoa do Barro
Northeast	BA	João Dourado	Lagoa do Meio
Northeast	BA	João Dourado	Lagoa do Rozeno
Northeast	BA	João Dourado	Lagoa dos Lundus
Northeast	BA	João Dourado	Mata do Milho
Northeast	BA	João Dourado	Para Quedas
Northeast	BA	João Dourado	Riacho
Northeast	BA	João Dourado	Sabino
Northeast	BA	João Dourado	Salinas
Northeast	BA	João Dourado	Serra Azul
Northeast	BA	João Dourado	Serrinha
Northeast	BA	João Dourado	Sertão Bonito
Northeast	BA	Juazeiro	Alagadiço
Northeast	BA	Juazeiro	Barrinha da Conceição
Northeast	BA	Juazeiro	Rodeadouro
Northeast	BA	Jussara	Algodões
Northeast	BA	Jussara	Sítio Novo
Northeast	BA	Lagoa Real	Lagoa do Rocha
Northeast	BA	Lamarão	Sítio de Santana
Northeast	BA	Lapão	Babilônia
Northeast	BA	Lapão	Casal I e Casal Ii
Northeast	BA	Lapão	Gonzaga
Northeast	BA	Lapão	Irecezinho
Northeast	BA	Lapão	Lageado Ii
Northeast	BA	Lapão	Lagedinho
Northeast	BA	Lapão	Lagedo de Eurípedes
Northeast	BA	Lapão	Lagedo do Pau d'Arco
Northeast	BA	Lapão	Lagoa do Galdêncio
Northeast	BA	Lapão	Largo
Northeast	BA	Lapão	Macambira
Northeast	BA	Lapão	Patos
Northeast	BA	Lapão	Salgada
Northeast	BA	Lapão	Volta Grande
Northeast	BA	Lauro de Freitas	Quingoma
Northeast	BA	Lençóis	Iuna
Northeast	BA	Lençóis	Lagoa
Northeast	BA	Lençóis	Remanso
Northeast	BA	Livramento de Nossa Senhora	Amola Faca
Northeast	BA	Livramento de Nossa Senhora	Cipoal
Northeast	BA	Livramento de Nossa Senhora	Couros
Northeast	BA	Livramento de Nossa Senhora	Jatobá
Northeast	BA	Livramento de Nossa Senhora	Jibóia
Northeast	BA	Livramento de Nossa Senhora	Lagoa do Leite
Northeast	BA	Livramento de Nossa Senhora	Lagoa dos Couros
Northeast	BA	Livramento de Nossa Senhora	Lagoinha
Northeast	BA	Livramento de Nossa Senhora	Maracujá
Northeast	BA	Livramento de Nossa Senhora	Olho d'Água do Meio
Northeast	BA	Livramento de Nossa Senhora	Pajeú
Northeast	BA	Livramento de Nossa Senhora	Poço
Northeast	BA	Livramento de Nossa Senhora	Rocinha-Itaguassu
Northeast	BA	Livramento de Nossa Senhora	Várzea Grande e Quixabeira
Northeast	BA	Malhada	Parateca e Pau d'Arco
Northeast	BA	Malhada	Tomé Nunes
Northeast	BA	Maragogipe	Angolá
Northeast	BA	Maragogipe	Baixão do Guaí
Northeast	BA	Maragogipe	Buri
Northeast	BA	Maragogipe	Enseada do Paraguaçu
Northeast	BA	Maragogipe	Giral Grande, Guerém e Tabatinga
Northeast	BA	Maragogipe	Guaruçú
Northeast	BA	Maragogipe	Porto da Pedra
Northeast	BA	Maragogipe	Quizanga
Northeast	BA	Maragogipe	Salaminas
Northeast	BA	Maragogipe	Sítio Dendê
Northeast	BA	Maragogipe	Zumbi
Northeast	BA	Maraú	Barro Vermelho
Northeast	BA	Maraú	Empata Viagem
Northeast	BA	Maraú	Maraú
Northeast	BA	Maraú	Quitungo
Northeast	BA	Maraú	São Raimundo
Northeast	BA	Maraú	Terra Verde e Minério
Northeast	BA	Mata de São João	Barreiros, Pau Grande e Tapera
Northeast	BA	Miguel Calmon	Saco, Covas e Mucambo dos Negros
Northeast	BA	Mirangaba	Almeida
Northeast	BA	Mirangaba	Coqueiros
Northeast	BA	Mirangaba	Dionisia e Olhos d' Água
Northeast	BA	Mirangaba	Jatobá
Northeast	BA	Mirangaba	Lagedo
Northeast	BA	Mirangaba	Nuguaçu
Northeast	BA	Mirangaba	Palmeira
Northeast	BA	Mirangaba	Ponto Alegre
Northeast	BA	Mirangaba	Sambaíba
Northeast	BA	Mirangaba	Santa Cruz
Northeast	BA	Mirangaba	Solidade
Northeast	BA	Monte Santo	Lage do Antônio
Northeast	BA	Morro do Chapéu	Barra Ii
Northeast	BA	Morro do Chapéu	Boa Vista
Northeast	BA	Morro do Chapéu	Gruta dos Brejões
Northeast	BA	Morro do Chapéu	Ouricuri Ii
Northeast	BA	Morro do Chapéu	Queimada Nova
Northeast	BA	Morro do Chapéu	Velame
Northeast	BA	Morro do Chapéu	Veredinha
Northeast	BA	Mortugaba	São Domingos
Northeast	BA	Mucugê	Barriguda
Northeast	BA	Mulungu do Morro	Alagadição e Alagadiço Ii
Northeast	BA	Mulungu do Morro	Baixa da Cainana
Northeast	BA	Mulungu do Morro	Caatinga do Egidio
Northeast	BA	Mulungu do Morro	Caldeirão e Rosendo
Northeast	BA	Mulungu do Morro	Cascavel
Northeast	BA	Mulungu do Morro	Lagoa Damasceno
Northeast	BA	Mulungu do Morro	Lagoa Preta
Northeast	BA	Mulungu do Morro	Lagoa Vermelha
Northeast	BA	Mulungu do Morro	Queimada da Onça
Northeast	BA	Mulungu do Morro	Umburaninha do Dionísio
Northeast	BA	Mundo Novo	Jequitibá
Northeast	BA	Muquém de São Francisco	Boa Vista do Pixaim
Northeast	BA	Muquém de São Francisco	Brejo Seco
Northeast	BA	Muquém de São Francisco	Cipó I
Northeast	BA	Muquém de São Francisco	Fazenda Grande
Northeast	BA	Muquém de São Francisco	Pedrinhas
Northeast	BA	Nilo Peçanha	Boitaraca
Northeast	BA	Nilo Peçanha	Jatimane
Northeast	BA	Nordestina	Bom Sucesso
Northeast	BA	Nordestina	Caldeirão
Northeast	BA	Nordestina	Caldeirão do Sangue
Northeast	BA	Nordestina	Grota
Northeast	BA	Nordestina	Lagoa da Cruz
Northeast	BA	Nordestina	Lagoa da Salina
Northeast	BA	Nordestina	Lagoa do Fumaça
Northeast	BA	Nordestina	Lagoa dos Bois
Northeast	BA	Nordestina	Laje das Cabras
Northeast	BA	Nordestina	Palha
Northeast	BA	Nordestina	Poças
Northeast	BA	Nordestina	Tanque Bonito
Northeast	BA	Nova Ibiá	Canarisco
Northeast	BA	Nova Viçosa	Cândido Mariano
Northeast	BA	Nova Viçosa	Helvécia
Northeast	BA	Nova Viçosa	Rio do Sul
Northeast	BA	Novo Horizonte	Góis
Northeast	BA	Ouriçangas	Bica
Northeast	BA	Ouriçangas	Buranhem
Northeast	BA	Ouriçangas	Caramuji
Northeast	BA	Ouriçangas	Durão
Northeast	BA	Ouriçangas	Fazenda Picada
Northeast	BA	Ouriçangas	Mambaça
Northeast	BA	Ouriçangas	Muguba
Northeast	BA	Ouriçangas	Pau Ferro
Northeast	BA	Palmas de Monte Alto	Angico
Northeast	BA	Palmas de Monte Alto	Aroeira
Northeast	BA	Palmas de Monte Alto	Barra
Northeast	BA	Palmas de Monte Alto	Brasileira e Adjacências
Northeast	BA	Palmas de Monte Alto	Cedro, Curral Novo e Sítio Canjirana
Northeast	BA	Palmas de Monte Alto	Empoeira
Northeast	BA	Palmas de Monte Alto	Fazenda Campos Sítio Leão
Northeast	BA	Palmas de Monte Alto	Juazeirinho e Adjacências
Northeast	BA	Palmas de Monte Alto	Jurema e Adjacencias
Northeast	BA	Palmas de Monte Alto	Mari
Northeast	BA	Palmas de Monte Alto	Rancho das Mães
Northeast	BA	Palmas de Monte Alto	Toquinha
Northeast	BA	Palmas de Monte Alto	Vargem Alta
Northeast	BA	Palmas de Monte Alto	Vargem Comprida
Northeast	BA	Palmeiras	Corcovado
Northeast	BA	Palmeiras	Fundão
Northeast	BA	Palmeiras	Serra Negra
Northeast	BA	Palmeiras	Tejuco
Northeast	BA	Paratinga	Barro
Northeast	BA	Paratinga	Lagoa do Jacaré
Northeast	BA	Paratinga	Tomba
Northeast	BA	Pedrão	Buri e Gameleira
Northeast	BA	Piatã	Barreiro, Caiçara, Ribeirão de Cima, Ribeirão do Meio e Tamburil
Northeast	BA	Piatã	Capão, Carrapicho, Mutuca e Sítio dos Pereiras
Northeast	BA	Piatã	Machado
Northeast	BA	Piatã	Palmeira
Northeast	BA	Piatã	Tijuco e Capão Frio
Northeast	BA	Pindaí	Boi
Northeast	BA	Pindaí	Caco, Vargem do Rancho e Taboa Ii
Northeast	BA	Pindobaçu	Bananeiras de Santa Efigênia
Northeast	BA	Pindobaçu	Fumaça
Northeast	BA	Pindobaçu	Laginha
Northeast	BA	Piripá	Contendas, Guaribas, Laginha e Rancho de Casca
Northeast	BA	Planaltino	Caboclo
Northeast	BA	Planalto	Cinzento
Northeast	BA	Planalto	Lagoinha
Northeast	BA	Poções	Lagoa do João, Pimenteira e Vassoura
Northeast	BA	Ponto Novo	Represa
Northeast	BA	Presidente Dutra	Colourdo Ramos
Northeast	BA	Presidente Jânio Quadros	Periperi
Northeast	BA	Presidente Tancredo Neves	Alto Alegre
Northeast	BA	Presidente Tancredo Neves	Pau da Letra
Northeast	BA	Quixabeira	Alto do Capim
Northeast	BA	Remanso	Vila Nossa Senhora Aparecida
Northeast	BA	Retirolândia	Alto do Jitaí
Northeast	BA	Riacho de Santana	Agreste
Northeast	BA	Riacho de Santana	Agrestinho
Northeast	BA	Riacho de Santana	Duas Lagoas
Northeast	BA	Riacho de Santana	Gatos Vesperina
Northeast	BA	Riacho de Santana	Largo da Vitória
Northeast	BA	Riacho de Santana	Paus Pretos
Northeast	BA	Riacho de Santana	Rio do Tanque
Northeast	BA	Riacho de Santana	Sambaíba
Northeast	BA	Riacho de Santana, Macaúbas	Mata do Sapé
Northeast	BA	Ribeirão do Largo	Thiagos
Northeast	BA	Rio de Contas	Baraúnas, Rancharia do Meio, Tapui, Várzea e Várzea Nova
Northeast	BA	Rio de Contas	Barra, Bananal e Riacho das Pedras
Northeast	BA	Rio Real	Mocambo do Rio Azul
Northeast	BA	Ruy Barbosa	Bairro das Flores
Northeast	BA	Salinas da Margarida	Conceição de Salinas
Northeast	BA	Salvador	Alto do Tororó
Northeast	BA	Salvador	Bananeiras
Northeast	BA	Salvador	Martelo, Ponta Grossa e Porto dos Cavalos
Northeast	BA	Salvador	Praia Grande
Northeast	BA	Santa Maria da Vitória	Montevidinha
Northeast	BA	Santa Teresinha	Campo Grande
Northeast	BA	Santo Amaro	Alto do Cruzeiro-Acupe
Northeast	BA	Santo Amaro	Cambuta
Northeast	BA	Santo Amaro	São Braz
Northeast	BA	São Domingos	Vila África
Northeast	BA	São Felix	Quilombo Pau Grande e Santo Antônio da Jaqueira
Northeast	BA	São Felix	Subahuma e Engenhoca
Northeast	BA	São Félix	Engenho São João
Northeast	BA	São Félix	Santo Antônio e Vidal
Northeast	BA	São Francisco do Conde	Monte Recôncavo
Northeast	BA	São Francisco do Conde	Porto de Dom João
Northeast	BA	São Gabriel	Boa Hora
Northeast	BA	São Gabriel	Buqueirão dos Carlos
Northeast	BA	São Gabriel	Caroazal
Northeast	BA	São Gabriel	Curralinho
Northeast	BA	São Gabriel	Lagoinha
Northeast	BA	São Gonçalo dos Campos	Bete Ii
Northeast	BA	São Sebastião do Passé	Palmeira da Água Boa
Northeast	BA	Saúde	Grota das Oliveiras
Northeast	BA	Seabra	Agreste
Northeast	BA	Seabra	Baixão Velho
Northeast	BA	Seabra	Cachoeira da Várzea e Mocambo da Cachoeira
Northeast	BA	Seabra	Capão das Gamelas
Northeast	BA	Seabra	Lagoa do Baixão
Northeast	BA	Seabra	Olhos d'Água do Basílio
Northeast	BA	Seabra	Serra do Queimadão
Northeast	BA	Seabra	Vão das Palmeiras
Northeast	BA	Seabra	Vazante
Northeast	BA	Senhor do Bonfim	Água Branca
Northeast	BA	Senhor do Bonfim	Alto Bonito
Northeast	BA	Senhor do Bonfim	Alto da Maravilha
Northeast	BA	Senhor do Bonfim	Anacleto
Northeast	BA	Senhor do Bonfim	Capim e Queimada Grande
Northeast	BA	Senhor do Bonfim	Cariacá
Northeast	BA	Senhor do Bonfim	Cazumba
Northeast	BA	Senhor do Bonfim	Cruzeiro
Northeast	BA	Senhor do Bonfim	Lage e Mamoeiro
Northeast	BA	Senhor do Bonfim	Laginha
Northeast	BA	Senhor do Bonfim	Olaria
Northeast	BA	Senhor do Bonfim	Passagem Velha
Northeast	BA	Senhor do Bonfim	Quebra Facão
Northeast	BA	Senhor do Bonfim	Umburana
Northeast	BA	Senhor do Bonfim, Antônio Gonçalves, Filadélfia	Tijuaçu
Northeast	BA	Serra do Ramalho	Água Fria
Northeast	BA	Serra do Ramalho	Barreiro Grande
Northeast	BA	Serra do Ramalho	Pambú e Araçá
Northeast	BA	Serrinha	Lagoa do Curralinho
Northeast	BA	Simões Filho	Dandá
Northeast	BA	Simões Filho	Pitanga dos Palmares
Northeast	BA	Simões Filho	Rio dos Macacos
Northeast	BA	Sítio do Mato	Barro Vermelho e Mangal
Northeast	BA	Souto Soares	Matinha e Cajazeira
Northeast	BA	Souto Soares	Novo Horizonte I
Northeast	BA	Souto Soares	Segredo
Northeast	BA	Tanhaçu	Pastinho
Northeast	BA	Tanhaçu	Tucum
Northeast	BA	Taperoá	Graciosa
Northeast	BA	Taperoá	Lanmego
Northeast	BA	Taperoá	Miguel Chico
Northeast	BA	Taperoá	Pedra Branca do Riacho do Ouro
Northeast	BA	Teolândia	Boqueirão
Northeast	BA	Teolândia	Paraíso
Northeast	BA	Terra Nova	Fazenda Retiro
Northeast	BA	Tremedal	Agreste
Northeast	BA	Tremedal	Quenta Sol
Northeast	BA	Tremendal	Tapioconga
Northeast	BA	Uibaí	Caldeirão
Northeast	BA	Uibaí	Lagoinha
Northeast	BA	Valença	Arueira
Northeast	BA	Valença	Buraco Azul
Northeast	BA	Valença	Candimba e Rio Vermelho
Northeast	BA	Valença	Jaqueira
Northeast	BA	Valença	Novo Horizonte I
Northeast	BA	Valença	Sarapuí
Northeast	BA	Valença	Vila Velha do Jequiriçá
Northeast	BA	Várzea Nova	Mulungu
Northeast	BA	Vera Cruz	Maragojipinho
Northeast	BA	Vera Cruz	Tereré
Northeast	BA	Vitória da Conquista	Alto da Cabeceira
Northeast	BA	Vitória da Conquista	Baixa Seca e Lagoa de Melquíades
Northeast	BA	Vitória da Conquista	Barreiro do Rio Pardo
Northeast	BA	Vitória da Conquista	Barrocas
Northeast	BA	Vitória da Conquista	Batalha e Lagoa do Arroz e Ribeirão do Paneleiro
Northeast	BA	Vitória da Conquista	Boqueirão
Northeast	BA	Vitória da Conquista	Cachoeira das Araras
Northeast	BA	Vitória da Conquista	Cachoeira do Rio Pardo
Northeast	BA	Vitória da Conquista	Cachoeira dos Porcos
Northeast	BA	Vitória da Conquista	Corta Lote
Northeast	BA	Vitória da Conquista	Furadinho
Northeast	BA	Vitória da Conquista	Lagoa de Vitorino
Northeast	BA	Vitória da Conquista	Lagoa dos Patos
Northeast	BA	Vitória da Conquista	Lagoa Maria Clemência (Poço Aninha, Caldeirão, Oiteiro, Manoel Antonio, Riacho de Teófilo, Baixão, Tabua, Muririba e Lagoa de Maria Clemência)
Northeast	BA	Vitória da Conquista	Lamarão
Northeast	BA	Vitória da Conquista	Laranjeiras
Northeast	BA	Vitória da Conquista	Quatis dos Fernandes
Northeast	BA	Vitória da Conquista	São Joaquim de Paulo
Northeast	BA	Vitória da Conquista	São Joaquim do Sertão
Northeast	BA	Vitória da Conquista	Sinzoca
Northeast	BA	Wanderley	Cachimbo
Northeast	BA	Wanderley	Riacho da Sacutiaba e Sacutiaba
Northeast	BA	Wenceslau Guimarães	Jericó
Northeast	BA	Wenceslau Guimarães	Mucugê
Northeast	BA	Wenceslau Guimarães	Nova Esperança
Northeast	BA	Wenceslau Guimarães	Riachão das Flores
Northeast	BA	Wenceslau Guimarães	Rio Preto
Northeast	BA	Wenceslau Guimarães	Sarilândia
Northeast	BA	Xique-Xique	Ilha de Champrona
Northeast	BA	Xique-Xique	Vicentes
Northeast	BA	Palmas de Monte Alto	Lagoa Seca e Regioes Vizinhas
Northeast	BA	São Felix	Terreno do Governo
Northeast	BA	Muritiba	Baixa Grande
Northeast	CE	Acaraú	Córrego dos Iús
Northeast	CE	Aracati	Córrego de Ubaranas
Northeast	CE	Aracati	Cumbe
Northeast	CE	Araripe, Salitre	Sítio Arruda
Northeast	CE	Baturité	Serra do Evaristo
Northeast	CE	Catunda, Tamboril	Lagoa das Pedras
Northeast	CE	Caucaia	Boqueirão das Araras
Northeast	CE	Caucaia	Boqueirãozinho
Northeast	CE	Caucaia	Caetanos Em Capuan
Northeast	CE	Caucaia	Cercadão do Dicetas
Northeast	CE	Caucaia	Deserto
Northeast	CE	Caucaia	Porteiras
Northeast	CE	Caucaia	Serra da Conceição
Northeast	CE	Caucaia	Serra da Rajada
Northeast	CE	Caucaia	Serra do Juá
Northeast	CE	Coreaú, Moraújo	Timbaúba
Northeast	CE	Crateús	Queimadas
Northeast	CE	Croatá, Ipueiras	Três Irmãos
Northeast	CE	Horizonte, Pacajus	Alto Alegre
Northeast	CE	Horizonte, Pacajus	Base
Northeast	CE	Ipueiras	Coité
Northeast	CE	Ipueiras	Sitio Trombetas
Northeast	CE	Itapipoca	Nazaré
Northeast	CE	Jardim	Serra dos Mulatos
Northeast	CE	Monsenhor Tabosa	Boa Vista dos Rodrigues
Northeast	CE	Monsenhor Tabosa	Buqueirão
Northeast	CE	Morrinhos	Alto Alegre
Northeast	CE	Morrinhos	Curralinho
Northeast	CE	Morrinhos	Junco Manso I
Northeast	CE	Novo Oriente	Barriguda
Northeast	CE	Novo Oriente	Bom Sucesso
Northeast	CE	Novo Oriente	Minador
Northeast	CE	Ocara	Melâncias
Northeast	CE	Pacujá	Batoque
Northeast	CE	Porteiras	Souza
Northeast	CE	Potengi	Sítio Carcará
Northeast	CE	Quiterianópolis	Croatá
Northeast	CE	Quiterianópolis	Fidelis
Northeast	CE	Quiterianópolis	Furada
Northeast	CE	Quiterianópolis	Gavião
Northeast	CE	Quiterianópolis	São Jerônimo
Northeast	CE	Quixadá	Sítio Veiga
Northeast	CE	Salitre	Nossa Senhora das Graças do Sitio Arapuca
Northeast	CE	Salitre	Renascer Lagoa dos Crioulos
Northeast	CE	Salitre	Serra dos Chagas
Northeast	CE	São Benedito	Sítio Carnauba Ii
Northeast	CE	Tamboril	Brutos
Northeast	CE	Tamboril	Encantados do Bom Jardim
Northeast	CE	Tamboril	Torres
Northeast	CE	Tauá	Consciência Negra
Northeast	CE	Tururu	Água Preta
Northeast	CE	Tururu	Conceição dos Caetanos
Northeast	CE	Parambu	Serra dos Rodrigues
Northeast	PB	Alagoa Grande	Caiana dos Crioulos
Northeast	PB	Areia	Engenho do Bonfim
Northeast	PB	Areia	Engenho Mundo Novo
Northeast	PB	Boa Vista	Santa Rosa
Northeast	PB	Cacimbas	Aracati, Chã I e Ii
Northeast	PB	Cacimbas	Serra Feia
Northeast	PB	Cajazeirinhas	Umburaninha
Northeast	PB	Cajazeirinhas	Vinhas
Northeast	PB	Camalaú	Roça Velha/Rua Preta
Northeast	PB	Catolé do Rocha	Curralinho/Jatobá
Northeast	PB	Catolé do Rocha	Lagoa Rasa
Northeast	PB	Catolé do Rocha	São Pedro dos Miguéis
Northeast	PB	Conde	Gurugi
Northeast	PB	Conde	Ipiranga
Northeast	PB	Conde	Mituaçu
Northeast	PB	Coremas	Comunidade Negra de Barreiras
Northeast	PB	Coremas	Mãe d'Água
Northeast	PB	Coremas	Santa Tereza
Northeast	PB	Diamante	Barra de Oitis
Northeast	PB	Diamante	Sítio Vaca Morta
Northeast	PB	Dona Inês	Cruz da Menina
Northeast	PB	Gurinhém, Mogeiro	Matão
Northeast	PB	Ingá, Serra Redonda	Pedra d'Água
Northeast	PB	João Pessoa	Paratibe
Northeast	PB	Livramento	Areia de Verão, Vila Teimosa e Sussuarana
Northeast	PB	Manaíra	Fonseca
Northeast	PB	Nova Palmeira	Serra do Abreu
Northeast	PB	Pombal	Daniel
Northeast	PB	Pombal	Os Barbosas
Northeast	PB	Pombal	Rufinos do Sítio São João
Northeast	PB	Riachão do Bacamarte	Grilo
Northeast	PB	Santa Luzia	Serra do Talhado
Northeast	PB	Santa Luzia	Serra do Talhado - Urbana
Northeast	PB	São Bento	Contendas
Northeast	PB	São Bento	Terra Nova
Northeast	PB	São João do Tigre	Cacimba Nova
Northeast	PB	São José de Princesa	Sítio Livramento
Northeast	PB	Serra Branca	Ligeiro de Baixo
Northeast	PB	Serra Branca	Sítio Cantinho
Northeast	PB	Serra Branca	Sítio Lagoinha
Northeast	PB	Serra Redonda	Sítio Matias
Northeast	PB	Tavares	Domingos Ferreira
Northeast	PB	Triunfo	40 Negros
Northeast	PB	Várzea	Pitombeira
Northeast	PE	Afogados da Ingazeira	Leitão
Northeast	PE	Afrânio	Sítio Araçá
Northeast	PE	Afrânio	Sítio Baixa do Caldeirão
Northeast	PE	Afrânio	Sítio Boa Vista
Northeast	PE	Agrestina	Furnas
Northeast	PE	Agrestina	Vila Pé da Serra dos Mendes
Northeast	PE	Águas Belas	Quilombo
Northeast	PE	Águas Belas	Sítio Pinhão
Northeast	PE	Águas Belas	Sítio Serra Preta
Northeast	PE	Águas Belas	Tanquinhos
Northeast	PE	Alagoinha	Alverne
Northeast	PE	Alagoinha	Campo do Magé
Northeast	PE	Alagoinha	Laje do Carrapicho
Northeast	PE	Altinho	Guaraciaba
Northeast	PE	Betânia	Sítio Baixas
Northeast	PE	Betânia	Sítio de Brêdos
Northeast	PE	Betânia	Sítio São Caetano
Northeast	PE	Betânia	Sítio Teixeira
Northeast	PE	Bezerros	Guaribas
Northeast	PE	Bom Conselho	Angico
Northeast	PE	Bom Conselho	Angico de Cima
Northeast	PE	Bom Conselho	Barrocão
Northeast	PE	Bom Conselho	Isabel
Northeast	PE	Bom Conselho	Lagoa Cumprida
Northeast	PE	Bom Conselho	Macacos
Northeast	PE	Bom Conselho	Mocós
Northeast	PE	Bom Conselho	Sítio Amargoso
Northeast	PE	Bom Conselho	Sítio Flores
Northeast	PE	Bom Conselho	Sítio Lagoa Primeira
Northeast	PE	Bom Conselho	Sítio Queimada Grande
Northeast	PE	Brejão	Batinga
Northeast	PE	Brejão	Curiquinha dos Negros
Northeast	PE	Buíque	Sítio Mundo Novo e Façola
Northeast	PE	Cabo de Santo Agostinho	Engenho Trapiche
Northeast	PE	Cabo de Santo Agostinho	Onze Negras
Northeast	PE	Cabrobó	Cruz do Riacho
Northeast	PE	Cabrobó	Fazenda Bela Vista
Northeast	PE	Cabrobó	Fazenda Manguinha
Northeast	PE	Cabrobó	Fazenda Santana
Northeast	PE	Cabrobó	Jatobá Ii
Northeast	PE	Caetés	Atoleiro
Northeast	PE	Capoeiras	Fidelão
Northeast	PE	Capoeiras	Sítio Cascavel
Northeast	PE	Capoeiras	Sitio Imbé
Northeast	PE	Carnaíba	Abelha
Northeast	PE	Carnaíba	Brejo de Dentro
Northeast	PE	Carnaíba	Gameleira
Northeast	PE	Carnaíba	Travessão do Caroá
Northeast	PE	Carnaubeira da Penha	São Gonçalo
Northeast	PE	Carnaubeira da Penha	Tiririca
Northeast	PE	Cupira	Sambaquim
Northeast	PE	Custódia	Buenos Aires
Northeast	PE	Custódia	Cachoeira
Northeast	PE	Custódia	Lagoinha
Northeast	PE	Custódia	São José
Northeast	PE	Custódia	Serra da Torre, Sabá, Engenho, Mocó, Mulungú, Barro Branco, Cardoso, Santa Maria, Pitombeira, Calderão, Tamboril, Balanças, Lagoa Cercada, Açudinho, Cacimba Limpa de Cima, Saco Grande, Santana do Sabá
Northeast	PE	Custódia	Sítio Açudinho
Northeast	PE	Custódia	Sítio Cachoeira da Onça
Northeast	PE	Custódia	Sítio Carvalho (Sítios Vassouras, Poço do Capim, Cacimba Limpa, Barreiros, Papagaio, Bigode, Lagoa da Onça, Riacho Novo, Areia, Umbuzeiro, Fazenda Nova, Juá I e Ii, Barriguda, Samambaia, Poço do Boi, Barro Branco, Trocado e Bandeira)
Northeast	PE	Custódia	Sítio Grotão
Northeast	PE	Custódia	Sítio Lajedo
Northeast	PE	Custódia	Sítio Riacho do Meio
Northeast	PE	Custódia	Sítio Santana
Northeast	PE	Flores	Cavalhada
Northeast	PE	Floresta	Filhos de Pajeú (Boqueirão, Cachoeira, Melancia, Cabeça de Vaca e Bezerra)
Northeast	PE	Floresta	Negros do Pajeú
Northeast	PE	Garanhuns	Caluete
Northeast	PE	Garanhuns	Castainho
Northeast	PE	Garanhuns	Estiva
Northeast	PE	Garanhuns	Estrela
Northeast	PE	Garanhuns	Tigre
Northeast	PE	Garanhuns	Timbó
Northeast	PE	Goiana	Povoação
Northeast	PE	Iati	Sítio Retiro
Northeast	PE	Iguaraci	Queimada dos Felipes
Northeast	PE	Iguaraci	Varzinha dos Quilombolas
Northeast	PE	Inajá	Enjeitado
Northeast	PE	Inajá	Poço Dantas
Northeast	PE	Ipojuca	Ilha das Mercês
Northeast	PE	Itacuruba	Ingazeira
Northeast	PE	Itacuruba	Negros de Gilú
Northeast	PE	Itacuruba	Poço dos Cavalos
Northeast	PE	Itaíba	Cacimba de Negras e Mocambo
Northeast	PE	Itaíba	Caraíbas
Northeast	PE	Itaíba	Estreito
Northeast	PE	Itaíba	Flores e Vilãozinho
Northeast	PE	Itaíba	Lagoa do Bento
Northeast	PE	Itaíba	Riacho Seco e Caboclo
Northeast	PE	Lagoa do Carro	Barro Preto
Northeast	PE	Lagoa dos Gatos	Cavuco
Northeast	PE	Lagoa dos Gatos	Pau Ferrado
Northeast	PE	Lagoa Grande	Lambedor
Northeast	PE	Mirandiba	Araçá
Northeast	PE	Mirandiba	Balanço
Northeast	PE	Mirandiba	Cajueiro
Northeast	PE	Mirandiba	Caruru
Northeast	PE	Mirandiba	Fazenda Pau-De-Leite
Northeast	PE	Mirandiba	Fazenda Quixabeira Helena Gomes da Silva
Northeast	PE	Mirandiba	Feijão
Northeast	PE	Mirandiba	Jardim
Northeast	PE	Mirandiba	Juazeiro Grande
Northeast	PE	Mirandiba	Pedra Branca
Northeast	PE	Mirandiba	Posse
Northeast	PE	Mirandiba	Queimadas
Northeast	PE	Mirandiba	Serra do Talhado
Northeast	PE	Mirandiba	Serra Verde
Northeast	PE	Olinda	Portão do Gelo
Northeast	PE	Orocó	Fazenda Caatinguinha, Mata São José, Remanso, Umburana e Vitorino
Northeast	PE	Panelas	Riachão do Sambaquim
Northeast	PE	Panelas	Sítio Sambaquim
Northeast	PE	Passira	Cacimbinha
Northeast	PE	Passira	Chã dos Negros
Northeast	PE	Pesqueira	Negros do Osso
Northeast	PE	Petrolândia	Borda do Lago
Northeast	PE	Petrolina	Afranto
Northeast	PE	Petrolina	Fandango
Northeast	PE	Quixaba	Sítio Gia
Northeast	PE	Rio Formoso	Engenho Siqueira
Northeast	PE	Rio Formoso	Povoado Demanda
Northeast	PE	Salgadinho	Conte
Northeast	PE	Salgueiro	Conceição das Crioulas
Northeast	PE	Salgueiro	Santana Iii
Northeast	PE	Salgueiro	Tamboril
Northeast	PE	Salgueiro, Terra Nova	Contendas
Northeast	PE	Saloá	Serra de São Pedro
Northeast	PE	Santa Maria da Boa Vista	Cupira
Northeast	PE	Santa Maria da Boa Vista	Inhanhum
Northeast	PE	Santa Maria da Boa Vista	Saruê
Northeast	PE	Santa Maria da Boa Vista	Serrote
Northeast	PE	São Bento do Una	Caibra
Northeast	PE	São Bento do Una	Caldeirãozinho
Northeast	PE	São Bento do Una	Jiraú
Northeast	PE	São Bento do Una	Primavera
Northeast	PE	São Bento do Una	Serrote do Gado Brabo
Northeast	PE	São Bento do Una	Sítio Barro Branco
Northeast	PE	São Caetano	Japecanga e Sítio Barro Vermelho
Northeast	PE	São José do Egito	Queimada de Zé Vicente
Northeast	PE	Serra Talhada	Alto da Luanda
Northeast	PE	Serra Talhada	Catolé
Northeast	PE	Serra Talhada	Ponta da Serra
Northeast	PE	Sertânia	Riacho dos Porcos
Northeast	PE	Sertânia	Severo
Northeast	PE	Triunfo	Águas Claras
Northeast	PE	Triunfo	Segredo
Northeast	PE	Tupanatinga	Boqueirão
Northeast	PE	Tupanatinga	Carrasco
Northeast	PE	Tupanatinga	Porteira
Northeast	PE	Tupanatinga	Sanharo
Northeast	PE	Vicência	Trigueiros
Northeast	PI	Acauã	Angical de Cima
Northeast	PI	Acauã	Escondido
Northeast	PI	Acauã	Tanque de Cima
Northeast	PI	Amarante	Mimbó
Northeast	PI	Amarante	Periperi
Northeast	PI	Assunção do Piauí	Sítio Velho
Northeast	PI	Batalha	Carnaúba Amarela
Northeast	PI	Batalha	Estreito
Northeast	PI	Batalha	Lagoa da Serra
Northeast	PI	Batalha	Manga/Iús
Northeast	PI	Bela Vista do Piauí	Amarra Negro
Northeast	PI	Betânia do Piauí	Baixão
Northeast	PI	Betânia do Piauí	Laranjo
Northeast	PI	Betânia do Piauí	Silvino
Northeast	PI	Bonfim do Piauí, Dirceu Arcoverde, Fartura do Piauí, São Lourenço do Piauí, São Raimundo Nonato, Várzea Branca	Lagoas
Northeast	PI	Campinas do Piauí	Salinas
Northeast	PI	Campinas do Piauí	Volta do Campo Grande
Northeast	PI	Campo Alegre do Fidalgo	Santa Maria do Canto
Northeast	PI	Campo Grande do Piauí	São José
Northeast	PI	Campo Largo do Piauí	São João Vila Boa Esperança
Northeast	PI	Caridade do Piauí	Cabaceira
Northeast	PI	Caridade do Piauí	Chapada do Encanto
Northeast	PI	Colônia do Piauí	Angical
Northeast	PI	Colônia do Piauí	Mourões
Northeast	PI	Curral Novo do Piauí	Caetitu
Northeast	PI	Curral Novo do Piauí	Garapa
Northeast	PI	Dom Inocêncio	Barra das Queimadas
Northeast	PI	Dom Inocêncio	Jatobazinho
Northeast	PI	Dom Inocêncio	Poço do Cachorro
Northeast	PI	Esperantina	Curralinho
Northeast	PI	Esperantina	Olho d'Água dos Pires
Northeast	PI	Esperantina	Vereda dos Anacletos
Northeast	PI	Isaías Coelho	Fazenda Nova e Carreira da Vaca
Northeast	PI	Isaías Coelho	Barreiras, Cabeca da Vaca, Cipoal, Morrinho e Sape
Northeast	PI	Isaías Coelho	Caraíbas
Northeast	PI	Isaías Coelho	Queimada Grande
Northeast	PI	Isaías Coelho	Riacho Fundo
Northeast	PI	Isaías Coelho	Sabonete
Northeast	PI	Jacobina do Piauí	Campo Alegre
Northeast	PI	Jacobina do Piauí	Chapada
Northeast	PI	Jacobina do Piauí	Maria
Northeast	PI	Jerumenha	Artur Passos
Northeast	PI	João Costa	Poço Salgado
Northeast	PI	Nova Santa Rita	Caboclo
Northeast	PI	Oeiras	Canadá Corrente
Northeast	PI	Oeiras	Cantinho Corrente
Northeast	PI	Oeiras	Canto Fazenda Frade
Northeast	PI	Oeiras	Queiroz
Northeast	PI	Paquetá	Canabrava dos Amaros
Northeast	PI	Paquetá	Custaneira
Northeast	PI	Paquetá	Mutamba
Northeast	PI	Paulistana	Angical
Northeast	PI	Paulistana	Barro Vermelho
Northeast	PI	Paulistana	Chupeiro
Northeast	PI	Paulistana	Contente
Northeast	PI	Paulistana	São Martins
Northeast	PI	Paulistana	Sombrio
Northeast	PI	Pedro Laurentino, Nova Santa Rita, São João do Piauí	Riacho dos Negros
Northeast	PI	Piripiri	Marinheiro
Northeast	PI	Piripiri	Sussuarana
Northeast	PI	Piripiri	Vaquejador
Northeast	PI	Queimada Nova	Baixa da Onça
Northeast	PI	Queimada Nova	Mucambo
Northeast	PI	Queimada Nova	Pitombeira
Northeast	PI	Queimada Nova	Sumidouro
Northeast	PI	Queimada Nova	Tapuio
Northeast	PI	Queimada Nova	Veredão
Northeast	PI	Queimada Nova	Volta do Riacho
Northeast	PI	Redenção do Gurguéia	Brejão dos Aipins
Northeast	PI	Santa Cruz do Piauí	Atrás da Serra
Northeast	PI	Santa Cruz do Piauí	Chapada
Northeast	PI	Santa Cruz do Piauí	Lagoa Grande
Northeast	PI	Santa Cruz do Piauí	Ponta do Morro
Northeast	PI	São João da Varjota	Angical
Northeast	PI	São João da Varjota	Cepisa
Northeast	PI	São João da Varjota	Paquetá
Northeast	PI	São João da Varjota	Potes
Northeast	PI	São João do Piauí	Picos
Northeast	PI	São João do Piauí	Saco do Curtume
Northeast	PI	São José do Piauí	Saco da Várzea
Northeast	PI	São Miguel do Tapuio	Macacos
Northeast	PI	Simões	Amparo
Northeast	PI	Simões	Belmonte dos Cupiras
Northeast	PI	Valença do Piauí	Tranqueira
Northeast	PI	Vera Mendes	Barrinha
Northeast	PI	Wall Ferraz	Grotões
Northeast	RN	Acari	Sítio Saco do Pereira
Northeast	RN	Açu	Bela Vista Piató
Northeast	RN	Afonso Bezerra	Cabeço dos Mendes
Northeast	RN	Afonso Bezerra	Curralinho
Northeast	RN	Angicos	Livramento
Northeast	RN	Bodó, Lagoa Nova, Santana do Matos	Macambira
Northeast	RN	Bom Jesus	Sítio Grossos
Northeast	RN	Bom Jesus	Sítio Pavilhão
Northeast	RN	Ceará-Mirim	Coqueiros
Northeast	RN	Coronel João Pessoa	Comum
Northeast	RN	Currais Novos	Negros do Riacho
Northeast	RN	Ielmo Marinho	Nova Descoberta
Northeast	RN	Ipanguaçu	Picadas
Northeast	RN	Jundiá	Arisco dos Pires
Northeast	RN	Jundiá	Família Mascenas
Northeast	RN	Jundiá	Família Quitéria
Northeast	RN	Jundiá	Rego de Pedra
Northeast	RN	Luís Gomes	Lagoa do Mato e Coati
Northeast	RN	Macaíba	Capoeiras
Northeast	RN	Parelhas	Boa Vista dos Negros
Northeast	RN	Parnamirim	Sítio Moita Verde
Northeast	RN	Patu	Jatobá
Northeast	RN	Pedro Avelino	Aroeira
Northeast	RN	Poço Branco	Acauã
Northeast	RN	Portalegre	Sítio Arrojado/Engenho Novo
Northeast	RN	Portalegre	Sítio Lajes
Northeast	RN	Portalegre	Sítio Pega
Northeast	RN	Portalegre	Sítio Sobrado
Northeast	RN	Santo Antônio	Cajazeiras
Northeast	RN	São Tomé	Gameleira de Baixo
Northeast	RN	Tibau do Sul	Sibaúma
Northeast	RN	Touros	Baixa do Quinquim
Northeast	RN	Touros	Geral
Northeast	SE	Amparo de São Francisco, Aquidabã, Canhoba, Cedro de São João, Telha	Caraíbas
Northeast	SE	Amparo de São Francisco, Telha	Lagoa dos Campinhos
Northeast	SE	Aquidabã	Mocambo
Northeast	SE	Aracaju	Maloca
Northeast	SE	Barra dos Coqueiros	Pontal da Barra
Northeast	SE	Brejo Grande	Brejão dos Negros
Northeast	SE	Canindé de São Francisco	Rua dos Negros
Northeast	SE	Capela	Canta Galo
Northeast	SE	Capela	Fazenda Pirangi
Northeast	SE	Capela	Terra Dura e Coqueiral
Northeast	SE	Cumbe	Povoado Forte
Northeast	SE	Estância	Curuanha
Northeast	SE	Estância	Porto d'Areia
Northeast	SE	Frei Paulo	Catuabo
Northeast	SE	Ilha das Flores	Bongue
Northeast	SE	Indiaroba	Desterro
Northeast	SE	Japaratuba	Patioba
Northeast	SE	Japoatã	Ladeiras
Northeast	SE	Lagarto	Campo do Crioulo, Crioulo, Madalena, Pindoba e Saco do Tigre
Northeast	SE	Laranjeiras	Mussuca
Northeast	SE	Pirambu	Alagamar
Northeast	SE	Pirambu	Aningas
Northeast	SE	Poço Redondo	Serra da Guia
Northeast	SE	Poço Verde	Lagoa do Junco
Northeast	SE	Porto da Folha	Mocambo
Northeast	SE	Propriá	Santo Antônio Canafistula
Northeast	SE	Riachão do Dantas	Povoado Forras
Northeast	SE	Riachuelo	Quebra Chifre
Northeast	SE	Santa Luzia do Itanhy	Luzienses (Rua da Palha, Pedra Furada, Crasto, Cajazeiras, Taboa, Pedra d' Água, Bode e Botequim)
Northeast	SE	Simão Dias	Sítio Alto
Northeast	SE	Siriri	Lagoa Grande
Northeast	SE	Siriri	Castanhal
North	AM	Barcelos, Novo Airão	Tambor
North	AM	Barreirinha	Boa Fé
North	AM	Barreirinha	Ituquara
North	AM	Barreirinha	São Pedro
North	AM	Barreirinha	Tereza do Matupiri
North	AM	Barreirinha	Trindade
North	AM	Itacoatiara	Sagrado Coração de Jesus do Lago de Serpa
North	AM	Manaus	Barranco
North	AP	Calçoene	Cunani
North	AP	Ferreira Gomes	Igarapé do Palha
North	AP	Itaubal	São Miguel do Macacoari
North	AP	Laranjal do Jari	São José
North	AP	Macapá	Abacate da Pedreira
North	AP	Macapá	Ambé
North	AP	Macapá	Campina Grande
North	AP	Macapá	Carmo do Maruanum
North	AP	Macapá	Conceição do Macacoari
North	AP	Macapá	Curiaú
North	AP	Macapá	Curralinho
North	AP	Macapá	Ilha Redonda
North	AP	Macapá	Lago do Papagaio
North	AP	Macapá	Lagoa dos Índios
North	AP	Macapá	Mel da Pedreira
North	AP	Macapá	Porto do Abacate
North	AP	Macapá	Ressaca da Pedreira
North	AP	Macapá	Rio Pescado
North	AP	Macapá	Rosa
North	AP	Macapá	Santa Lúzia do Maruanum I
North	AP	Macapá	Santo Antônio da Pedreira
North	AP	Macapá	Santo Antônio do Matapi
North	AP	Macapá	São João do Maruanum Ii
North	AP	Macapá	São João do Matapi
North	AP	Macapá	São José do Mata Fome
North	AP	Macapá	São José do Matapi do Porto do Céu
North	AP	Macapá	São Pedro dos Bois
North	AP	Macapá	Torrão do Matapi
North	AP	Macapá, Santana	São Raimundo da Pirativa
North	AP	Mazagão	Igarapé do Lago do Maracá (Mari, Conceição, Joaquina, Fortaleza e Laranjal do Maracá)
North	AP	Oiapoque	Kulumbú do Patuazinho
North	AP	Oiapoque	Vila Velha do Cassiporé
North	AP	Santana	Alto Pirativa
North	AP	Santana	Cinco Chagas
North	AP	Santana	Engenho do Matapí
North	AP	Santana	Igarapé do Lago
North	AP	Santana	Nossa Senhora do Desterro dos Dois Irmãos
North	AP	Santana	São Francisco do Matapí
North	AP	Tartarugalzinho	São Tomé do Aporema
North	AP	Vitória do Jari	Taperera
North	PA	Abaetetuba	Alto e Baixo Itacuruçá, Campopema, Jenipaúba, Acaraqui, Igarapé São João (Médio Itacuruçá), Arapapu, Rio Tauaré-Açú, Arapapuzinho e Rio Ipanema
North	PA	Abaetetuba	Bom Remédio
North	PA	Abaetetuba	Caeté
North	PA	Abaetetuba	Ramal do Bacuri
North	PA	Abaetetuba	Ramal do Piratuba
North	PA	Abaetetuba	Samaúma
North	PA	Abaetetuba, Moju	África e Laranjituba
North	PA	Abaetetuba, Moju	Moju-Miri
North	PA	Acará	Alto do Acará
North	PA	Acará	Carananduba
North	PA	Acará	Espirito Santo
North	PA	Acará	Guajará Miri
North	PA	Acará	Itacoãzinho e Santa Quitéria
North	PA	Acará	Itancuã Miri
North	PA	Acará	Itapuama
North	PA	Acará	Monte Alegre
North	PA	Acará	Paraíso
North	PA	Acará	Trindade Iii
North	PA	Acará, Concórdia do Pará	Menino Jesus de Acará
North	PA	Acará, Moju	Nossa Senhora da Conceição
North	PA	Acará, Moju	Oxalá de Jacunday
North	PA	Alenquer	Pacoval
North	PA	Ananindeua	Abacatal-Aurá
North	PA	Bagre	Ajará, Boa Esperança, São Sebastião e Tatituquara
North	PA	Bagre	Baileiro
North	PA	Bagre, Moju	São Sebastião
North	PA	Baião	Boa Vista
North	PA	Baião	Calados
North	PA	Baião	Fugido Rio Tucunaré
North	PA	Baião	Paritá Miri
North	PA	Baião	Santa Fé e Santo Antônio
North	PA	Baião	Umarizal
North	PA	Baião	Umarizal Beira
North	PA	Baião	Vila de Joana Peres
North	PA	Baião, Mocajuba, Oeiras do Pará	Araquembáua, Baixinha, Campelo, Carará, Costeiro, Cupu, França, Igarapé Preto, Igarapezinho, Panpelônia, Teófilo e Varzinha
North	PA	Baião, Oeiras do Pará	Bailique
North	PA	Barcarena	Gibrié do São Lourenço
North	PA	Barcarena	São Sebastião de Burajuba
North	PA	Barcarena	Sítio Conceição
North	PA	Barcarena	Sítio Cupuaçu/Boa Vista
North	PA	Barcarena	Sítio São João
North	PA	Belém	Sucurijuquara
North	PA	Bonito	Cuxiú
North	PA	Bragança	América
North	PA	Breu Branco	Jutaí
North	PA	Bujaru	São Judas Tadeu
North	PA	Cachoeira do Arari	Gurupá
North	PA	Cachoeira do Piriá	Bela Aurora
North	PA	Cachoeira do Piriá	Camiranga
North	PA	Cachoeira do Piriá	Itamoari
North	PA	Cametá	Matias
North	PA	Cametá	Porto Alegre
North	PA	Cametá	São Benedito
North	PA	Cametá, Mocajuba	Itabatinga, Mangabeira, Santo Antônio de Vizeu, São Benedito de Viseu, Porto Grande, Uxizal e Vizania
North	PA	Capitão Poço, Santa Luzia do Pará	Narcisa
North	PA	Castanhal	Macapazinho
North	PA	Castanhal	São Pedro-Bacuri
North	PA	Castanhal, Inhangapi	Cacoal, Itabóca e Quatro Bocas
North	PA	Colares	Cacau e Ovo
North	PA	Colares	Terra Amarela
North	PA	Concórdia do Pará	Campo Verde
North	PA	Concórdia do Pará	Igarape Dona Carupere
North	PA	Concórdia do Pará	Nossa Senhora da Conceição Caruperê
North	PA	Concórdia do Pará	Nossa Senhora da Conceição Ipanema
North	PA	Concórdia do Pará	Nossa Senhora das Graças Vila do Cravo
North	PA	Concórdia do Pará	Nossa Senhora do Perpétuo Socorro
North	PA	Concórdia do Pará	Santo Antônio
North	PA	Concórdia do Pará	Timboteua Cravo
North	PA	Concórdia do Pará	Velho Expedito
North	PA	Curralinho	Sã0 José da Povoação do Ri0 Mutuacá
North	PA	Garrafão do Norte	Castanhalzinho
North	PA	Garrafão do Norte	Cutuvelo
North	PA	Gurupá	Alto Ipixuna
North	PA	Gurupá	Alto Pucuruí
North	PA	Gurupá	Bacá do Ipixuna
North	PA	Gurupá	Camutá do Ipixuna
North	PA	Gurupá	Carrazedo
North	PA	Gurupá	Flexinha
North	PA	Gurupá	Gurupá Mirim
North	PA	Gurupá	Jocojó
North	PA	Gurupá	Maria Ribeira
North	PA	Gurupá	São Francisco Médio do Ipixuna
North	PA	Igarapé-Açu	Nossa Senhora do Livramento
North	PA	Inhangapi	Bandeira Branca
North	PA	Inhangapi	Cumaru
North	PA	Inhangapi	Menino Jesus de Petimandeua
North	PA	Inhangapi	Paraíso
North	PA	Irituia	Bracinho
North	PA	Irituia	Medianeira das Graças
North	PA	Irituia	Nossa Senhora do Carmo do Igarapé da Ponte
North	PA	Irituia	Nossa Senhora do Perpétuo Socorro da Montanha
North	PA	Irituia	Nova Laudicéia
North	PA	Irituia	Santa Maria do Curaçá
North	PA	Irituia	Santa Maria do Retiro
North	PA	Irituia	Santa Terezinha
North	PA	Irituia	Santo Antônio
North	PA	Irituia	São Francisco do Maracaxeta
North	PA	Irituia	São José do Açaiteua
North	PA	Irituia	São José do Patauateua
North	PA	Mocajuba	Tambaí Açú
North	PA	Mocajuba, Moju	São José do Icatu
North	PA	Moju	Bom Jesus Centro Ouro, Nossa Senhora das Graças e São Bernardino
North	PA	Moju	Cacoal e Espírito Santo
North	PA	Moju	Castelo
North	PA	Moju	Jambuaçu
North	PA	Moju	Juquirí
North	PA	Moju	Ribeira do Jambu-Açu
North	PA	Moju	Santa Luzia do Bom Prazer
North	PA	Moju	Santa Luzia do Tracuateua
North	PA	Moju	Santa Maria de Mirindeua
North	PA	Moju	Santa Maria do Traquateua
North	PA	Moju	Santana do Baixo Jambuaçu
North	PA	Moju	Santo Cristo
North	PA	Moju	São Jorge
North	PA	Moju	São Manoel
North	PA	Moju	Sítio Bosque
North	PA	Monte Alegre	Passagem
North	PA	Monte Alegre	Peafú
North	PA	Óbidos	Arapucu
North	PA	Óbidos	Ariramba
North	PA	Óbidos	Cabeceiras (São José, Silêncio, Matá, Cuecé, Apuí e Castanhaduba)
North	PA	Óbidos	Igarapé-Açu
North	PA	Óbidos	Mondongo
North	PA	Óbidos	Muratubinha
North	PA	Óbidos	Nossa Senhora das Graças
North	PA	Óbidos	Patauá Umirizal
North	PA	Óbidos	Peruana
North	PA	Óbidos, Oriximiná	Acapú, Araçá, Boa Vista do Cuminá, Espírito Santo, Jarauacá – Erepecuru, Jauari, Pancada e Varre Vento
North	PA	Oeiras do Pará	Iigarapé Arirá
North	PA	Oriximiná	Abuí
North	PA	Oriximiná	Água Fria
North	PA	Oriximiná	Aracuan de Baixo, Aracuan de Cima, Aracuan do Meio, Bacabal, Jarauacá, Serrinha e Terra Preta Ii
North	PA	Oriximiná	Boa Vista
North	PA	Oriximiná	Cachoeira Porteira
North	PA	Oriximiná	Curuçá
North	PA	Oriximiná	Jamary
North	PA	Oriximiná	Juquiri Grande
North	PA	Oriximiná	Juquirizinho
North	PA	Oriximiná	Mae Cué, Sagrado Coração e Tapagem
North	PA	Oriximiná	Moura
North	PA	Oriximiná	Nova Esperança
North	PA	Oriximiná	Palhal
North	PA	Oriximiná	Paraná do Abuí
North	PA	Oriximiná	Último Quilombo Erepecú
North	PA	Ourém	Mocambo
North	PA	Ponta de Pedras	Santana do Arari
North	PA	Ponta de Pedras	Tartarugueiro
North	PA	Portel	Cipoal Rio do Pacajá
North	PA	Portel	São Tomé de Tauçú
North	PA	Prainha	União São João
North	PA	Salvaterra	Bacabal
North	PA	Salvaterra	Bairro Alto
North	PA	Salvaterra	Boa Vista
North	PA	Salvaterra	Caldeirão
North	PA	Salvaterra	Campina
North	PA	Salvaterra	Deus Ajude
North	PA	Salvaterra	Mangueira
North	PA	Salvaterra	Paixão
North	PA	Salvaterra	Pau Furado
North	PA	Salvaterra	Providência
North	PA	Salvaterra	Rosário
North	PA	Salvaterra	Salvá
North	PA	Salvaterra	Santa Luzia
North	PA	Salvaterra	São Benedito da Ponta
North	PA	Salvaterra	Siricarí
North	PA	Salvaterra	Vila União / Campina
North	PA	Santa Isabel do Pará	Boa Vista do Itá
North	PA	Santa Isabel do Pará	Jacarequara
North	PA	Santa Isabel do Pará	Macapazinho
North	PA	Santa Izabel do Pará	Santissima Trindade
North	PA	Santa Luzia do Pará	Jacarequara
North	PA	Santa Luzia do Pará	Muruteuazinho
North	PA	Santa Luzia do Pará	Pimenteiras
North	PA	Santa Luzia do Pará	Tipitinga
North	PA	Santa Luzia do Pará	Três Voltas
North	PA	Santarém	Arapemã
North	PA	Santarém	Bom Jardim
North	PA	Santarém	Maicá
North	PA	Santarém	Murumuru
North	PA	Santarém	Murumurutuba
North	PA	Santarém	Nova Vista do Ituqui
North	PA	Santarém	Patos do Ituqui
North	PA	Santarém	São José do Ituqui
North	PA	Santarém	São Raimundo do Ituqui
North	PA	Santarém	Saracura
North	PA	Santarém	Surubiu-Açu
North	PA	Santarém	Tiningu
North	PA	São Domingos do Capim	Rio Capim
North	PA	São Miguel do Guamá	Canta Galo
North	PA	São Miguel do Guamá	Menino Jesus
North	PA	São Miguel do Guamá	Nossa Senhora de Fátima do Crauateua
North	PA	São Miguel do Guamá	Santa Rita de Barreiras
North	PA	Tomé-Açu	Forte do Castelo
North	PA	Tomé-Açu	Igarapé Marupaúba
North	PA	Tomé-Açu	Itabocal Ponte
North	PA	Tomé-Açu	Nova Betel
North	PA	Tomé-Açu	Rosa de Saron
North	PA	Tomé-Açu	São Pedro
North	PA	Tomé-Açu	Tucumandeua
North	PA	Tracuateua	Cigano
North	PA	Tracuateua	Jurussaca
North	PA	Tracuateua	Torres
North	PA	Viseu	Cajueiro
North	PA	Viseu	Vila Mariana
North	PA	Viseu	João Grande
North	PA	Viseu, Boa Vista do Gurupi	Paca e Aningal
North	RO	Alta Floresta d'Oeste	Rolim de Moura do Guaporé
North	RO	Alta Floresta d'Oeste, São Francisco do Guaporé	Pedras Negras
North	RO	Costa Marques	Forte Príncipe da Beira
North	RO	Costa Marques	Santa Fé
North	RO	Pimenteiras do Oeste	Laranjeiras
North	RO	Pimenteiras do Oeste	Santa Cruz
North	RO	São Francisco do Guaporé	Santo Antônio do Guaporé
North	RO	São Miguel do Guaporé, Seringueiras	Jesus
Southeast	ES	Cachoeiro de Itapemirim	Monte Alegre
Southeast	ES	Conceição da Barra	Angelim, Angelim Disa, Angelim Ii, Angelim Iii e Córrego do Macuco
Southeast	ES	Conceição da Barra	Córrego do Alexandre
Southeast	ES	Conceição da Barra	Córrego do Sertão
Southeast	ES	Conceição da Barra	Córrego Santa Izabel
Southeast	ES	Conceição da Barra	Coxi
Southeast	ES	Conceição da Barra	Dona Guilherminda
Southeast	ES	Conceição da Barra	Linharinho (Dona Domingas, Dona Maria, Dona Anália, Dona Oscarina, Morro, Maria do Estado e Mateus de Ernesto)
Southeast	ES	Conceição da Barra	Morro da Onça
Southeast	ES	Conceição da Barra	Porto Grande
Southeast	ES	Conceição da Barra	Roda d'Água
Southeast	ES	Conceição da Barra	Santana
Southeast	ES	Conceição da Barra, São Mateus	São Domingos
Southeast	ES	Conceição da Barra, São Mateus	São Jorge (Morro das Araras, Vala Grande, São Jorge, Córrego do Sapato I, Córrego do Sapato Ii)
Southeast	ES	Fundão, Ibiraçu, Santa Teresa	São Pedro
Southeast	ES	Guaçuí	Córrego do Sossego
Southeast	ES	Guarapari	Alto do Iguape
Southeast	ES	Itapemirim	Graúna
Southeast	ES	Jaguaré	Palmito
Southeast	ES	Jeronimo Monteiro	Sítio dos Crioulos
Southeast	ES	Linhares	Degredo
Southeast	ES	Montanha	Santa Lúzia
Southeast	ES	Presidente Kennedy	Boa Esperança e Cacimbinha
Southeast	ES	Santa Leopoldina	Retiro
Southeast	ES	São Mateus	Beira-Rio Arural
Southeast	ES	São Mateus	Cacimba
Southeast	ES	São Mateus	Chiado
Southeast	ES	São Mateus	Córrego Seco
Southeast	ES	São Mateus	Dilô Barbosa
Southeast	ES	São Mateus	Divino Espírito Santo
Southeast	ES	São Mateus	Mata Sede
Southeast	ES	São Mateus	Nova Vista
Southeast	ES	São Mateus	Santaninha
Southeast	ES	São Mateus	São Domingos de Itauninhas
Southeast	ES	São Mateus	Serraria e São Cristóvão
Southeast	ES	Vargem Alta	Pedra Branca
Southeast	MG	Açucena	Fazenda Itaipava (Córrego do Monjolo, Córrego do Mato e Córrego Alto)
Southeast	MG	Almenara	Marobá
Southeast	MG	Almenara	Marobá dos Teixeiras
Southeast	MG	Amparo do Serra	Estiva
Southeast	MG	Angelândia	Alto dos Bois, Barra do Capão e Córrego do Engenho
Southeast	MG	Angelândia	Santo Antônio dos Moreiras
Southeast	MG	Antônio Carlos	Baú
Southeast	MG	Antônio Carlos	Cachoeirinha
Southeast	MG	Antônio Dias	Indaiá
Southeast	MG	Araçuaí	Arraial dos Crioulos
Southeast	MG	Araçuaí	Baú
Southeast	MG	Araçuaí	Córrego do Narciso do Meio
Southeast	MG	Araçuaí	Córrego Quilombo
Southeast	MG	Araçuaí	Giral
Southeast	MG	Ataléia	Salineiros
Southeast	MG	Barbacena	Candendês
Southeast	MG	Belo Horizonte	Família Souza
Southeast	MG	Belo Horizonte	Luízes
Southeast	MG	Belo Horizonte	Mangueiras
Southeast	MG	Belo Horizonte	Manzo Ngunzo Kaiango
Southeast	MG	Belo Oriente	Esperança
Southeast	MG	Belo Vale	Boa Morte
Southeast	MG	Belo Vale	Chacrinha
Southeast	MG	Berilo	Água Limpa de Baixo
Southeast	MG	Berilo	Água Limpa de Cima
Southeast	MG	Berilo	Alto Caititu e Muniz
Southeast	MG	Berilo	Barra do Ribeirão e Sanim
Southeast	MG	Berilo	Brejo
Southeast	MG	Berilo	Caititu do Meio
Southeast	MG	Berilo	Cruzeiro
Southeast	MG	Berilo	Lagoinha
Southeast	MG	Berilo	Mocó dos Pretos
Southeast	MG	Berilo	Morrinhos
Southeast	MG	Berilo	Quilombolas
Southeast	MG	Berilo	Roça Grande
Southeast	MG	Berilo	Tabuleiro
Southeast	MG	Berilo	Vai Lavando
Southeast	MG	Berilo	Vila Santo Isidoro
Southeast	MG	Berizal	Vila São João
Southeast	MG	Bertópolis	Pradinho
Southeast	MG	Bias Fortes	Colônia do Paiol
Southeast	MG	Bocaiúva	Borá
Southeast	MG	Bocaiúva	Macaúba Palmito e Macaúba Bela Vista
Southeast	MG	Bocaiúva	Mocambo e Sítio
Southeast	MG	Bom Despacho	Carrapatos da Tabatinga
Southeast	MG	Bom Despacho	Quenta Sol
Southeast	MG	Bom Jesus do Amparo	Felipe
Southeast	MG	Bonito de Minas	Barra da Ema
Southeast	MG	Bonito de Minas	Cabeceira de Rancharia
Southeast	MG	Bonito de Minas	Cabeceira do Salto
Southeast	MG	Bonito de Minas	Quilombola de Panelas
Southeast	MG	Bonito de Minas	Salto do Borrachudo
Southeast	MG	Bonito de Minas	Sumidouro e Vereda Bonita
Southeast	MG	Brasília de Minas	Angical
Southeast	MG	Brasília de Minas	Borá
Southeast	MG	Brumadinho	Marinhos e Rodrigues
Southeast	MG	Brumadinho	Ribeirão
Southeast	MG	Brumadinho	Sapé
Southeast	MG	Cantagalo	São Félix
Southeast	MG	Capelinha	Santo Antônio do Fanado
Southeast	MG	Capelinha, Veredinha	Vendinha, Galego e Córrego dos Macacos
Southeast	MG	Capelinha, Angelêndia	Fanadinho e Canoas
Southeast	MG	Capinópolis	Fazenda Sertãozinho
Southeast	MG	Carlos Chagas, Teófilo Otoni	Marcos
Southeast	MG	Catuji	Córrego Santana
Southeast	MG	Chapada do Norte	Córrego da Misericórdia
Southeast	MG	Chapada do Norte	Córrego da Tolda e Água Suja
Southeast	MG	Chapada do Norte	Córrego do Amorim e São João Piteiras
Southeast	MG	Chapada do Norte	Córrego do Cuba
Southeast	MG	Chapada do Norte	Córrego do Rocha
Southeast	MG	Chapada do Norte	Faceira
Southeast	MG	Chapada do Norte	Gravatá
Southeast	MG	Chapada do Norte	Moça Santa
Southeast	MG	Chapada do Norte	Porto dos Alves, Poções e Porto Servano
Southeast	MG	Chapada Gaúcha	Barro Vermelho
Southeast	MG	Chapada Gaúcha	Buraquinhos
Southeast	MG	Chapada Gaúcha	Prata
Southeast	MG	Chapada Gaúcha	São Félix
Southeast	MG	Chapada Gaúcha	São Miguel da Aldeia
Southeast	MG	Coluna	Furtuoso e Varjão
Southeast	MG	Coluna	Pitangueiras e Suassuí
Southeast	MG	Conceição do Mato Dentro	Unidos de Candeias
Southeast	MG	Conceição do Mato Dentro	Buraco, Cubas e Três Barras
Southeast	MG	Conceição do Mato Dentro	Candeias
Southeast	MG	Conselheiro Lafaiete	Mato Dentro
Southeast	MG	Contagem	Arturos
Southeast	MG	Coração de Jesus	São Geraldo
Southeast	MG	Coronel Murta	Mutuca de Cima
Southeast	MG	Cristália	Barreiro
Southeast	MG	Cristália	Paiol
Southeast	MG	Diamantina	Mata dos Crioulos
Southeast	MG	Diamantina	Quartel do Indaiá
Southeast	MG	Diamantina	Vargem do Inhaí
Southeast	MG	Divino	São Pedro de Cima
Southeast	MG	Dom Joaquim	Córrego Cachoeira, Ribeirão e Xambá
Southeast	MG	Dores de Guanhães	Berto
Southeast	MG	Dores de Guanhães	Bocaina
Southeast	MG	Dores de Guanhães	Peão
Southeast	MG	Felisburgo	Paraguai
Southeast	MG	Ferros	Mendonça
Southeast	MG	Formoso	São Francisco / Gentio
Southeast	MG	Fortuna de Minas	Beira do Córrego e Retiro dos Moreiras
Southeast	MG	Francisco Badaró	Mocó
Southeast	MG	Francisco Badaró	Passagem
Southeast	MG	Francisco Badaró	Tocoiós
Southeast	MG	Francisco Sá	Poções
Southeast	MG	Fronteira dos Vales	Boa Vista
Southeast	MG	Fronteira dos Vales	Os Nunes
Southeast	MG	Fronteira dos Vales	Ventania
Southeast	MG	Frutal	Serrinha
Southeast	MG	Gameleiras	Teotônio Gorutuba
Southeast	MG	Gameleiras, Jaíba, Pai Pedro, Porteirinha, Catuti, Janaúba, Monte Azul	Gorutuba
Southeast	MG	Gouveia	Espinho
Southeast	MG	Guanhães	Barreira e Valadão
Southeast	MG	Indaiabira	Brejo Grande
Southeast	MG	Itabira	Capoeirão
Southeast	MG	Itabira	Morro de Santo Antônio
Southeast	MG	Itamarandiba	Chico Alves, Gangorra, Veneno, Asa Branca, Córrego Fundo, Gaspar e Capoeira Grande
Southeast	MG	Itamarandiba	São Gil e São Gil Ii
Southeast	MG	Itamarandiba	Tabatinga
Southeast	MG	Itinga	Genipapo Pintos
Southeast	MG	Jaboticatubas	Açude
Southeast	MG	Jaboticatubas	Mato do Tição
Southeast	MG	Jaíba	Santa Luzia
Southeast	MG	Janaúba	Bem Viver de Vila Nova das Poções
Southeast	MG	Janaúba	Caetetus
Southeast	MG	Januária	Alegre, Alegre Ii e Barreiro do Alegre
Southeast	MG	Januária	Balaieiro
Southeast	MG	Januária	Barreiro e Morro Vermelho
Southeast	MG	Januária	Bom Jantar
Southeast	MG	Januária	Brejo do Amparo
Southeast	MG	Januária	Buritizinho, Lambedouro, Onça e Pedras
Southeast	MG	Januária	Cabano, Pitombeiras e Vila Aparecida
Southeast	MG	Januária	Casa Armada - Limeira
Southeast	MG	Januária	Croatá
Southeast	MG	Januária	Gameleira
Southeast	MG	Januária	Grotinha
Southeast	MG	Januária	Ilha
Southeast	MG	Januária	Jatobá Novo
Southeast	MG	Januária	Lapão
Southeast	MG	Januária	Macaúbas Capim Pubo
Southeast	MG	Januária	Moradeiras
Southeast	MG	Januária	Nova Odessa
Southeast	MG	Januária	Pasta Cavalo
Southeast	MG	Januária	Pau d'Óleo
Southeast	MG	Januária	Pé da Serra
Southeast	MG	Januária	Picos
Southeast	MG	Januária	Quebra Guiada
Southeast	MG	Januária	Retiro dos Bois
Southeast	MG	Januária	Riachinho
Southeast	MG	Januária	Riacho da Cruz, Água Viva e Caluzeiros
Southeast	MG	Januária	Riacho Novo (Vila Padre Hebert e Lagoinha)
Southeast	MG	Januária	Sangradouro Grande
Southeast	MG	Januária	Sítio Novo
Southeast	MG	Januária	Tabúa
Southeast	MG	Januária	Tatu
Southeast	MG	Januária	Umburana
Southeast	MG	Januária	Varzea da Cruz
Southeast	MG	Januária	Velho Chico
Southeast	MG	Jenipapo de Minas	Curtume
Southeast	MG	Jenipapo de Minas	Lagoa Grande
Southeast	MG	Jenipapo de Minas	Martins
Southeast	MG	Jenipapo de Minas	São José do Bolas
Southeast	MG	Jenipapo de Minas	Vila Silvolândia
Southeast	MG	Jequitibá	Campo Alegre
Southeast	MG	Jequitibá	Dr. Campolina
Southeast	MG	Jequitinhonha	Mumbuca
Southeast	MG	Joaíma	Rural Barreirinho
Southeast	MG	João Pinheiro	Santana do Caatinga
Southeast	MG	José Gonçalves de Minas	Estiva
Southeast	MG	Lassance	João Martins e Tira Barro
Southeast	MG	Leme do Prado	Porto Coris
Southeast	MG	Luislândia	Júlia Mulata
Southeast	MG	Manga	Bebedouro
Southeast	MG	Manga	Brejo de São Caetano
Southeast	MG	Manga	Espinho
Southeast	MG	Manga	Ilha da Ingazeira
Southeast	MG	Manga	Justa I
Southeast	MG	Manga	Justa Ii
Southeast	MG	Manga	Malhadinha
Southeast	MG	Manga	Pedra Preta
Southeast	MG	Manga	Puris/Calindó
Southeast	MG	Manga	Vila Primavera
Southeast	MG	Mariana	Vila Santa Efigenia
Southeast	MG	Materlândia	Botelho
Southeast	MG	Materlândia	Bufão
Southeast	MG	Matias Cardoso	Lapinha
Southeast	MG	Matias Cardoso	Praia
Southeast	MG	Mercês	Carreiros
Southeast	MG	Minas Novas	Bem Posta
Southeast	MG	Minas Novas	Capoeirinha
Southeast	MG	Minas Novas	Curralinho
Southeast	MG	Minas Novas	Gravatá, Mata Dois e Pinheiro
Southeast	MG	Minas Novas	Macuco
Southeast	MG	Minas Novas	Quilombo
Southeast	MG	Moeda	Taquaraçu
Southeast	MG	Monte Azul	Laranjeira, Buqueirão, Pesqueiro, Socô Velho, Socô Verde e Tira Barro
Southeast	MG	Monte Azul	Língua d'Água, Roçado e São Sebastião
Southeast	MG	Monte Azul	Pacui e Poções
Southeast	MG	Montes Claros	Dos Nogueira
Southeast	MG	Montes Claros	Monte Alto
Southeast	MG	Muzambinho	Muzambinho
Southeast	MG	Nazareno	Jaguara e Palmital
Southeast	MG	Olhos d'Água	Macaúbas Curral
Southeast	MG	Ouro Verde de Minas	Água Limpa
Southeast	MG	Ouro Verde de Minas	Água Preta
Southeast	MG	Ouro Verde de Minas	Água Preta de Cima
Southeast	MG	Ouro Verde de Minas	Córrego Carneiro
Southeast	MG	Ouro Verde de Minas	Negra Rural de Quilombo
Southeast	MG	Ouro Verde de Minas	Santa Cruz
Southeast	MG	Paracatu	Cercado
Southeast	MG	Paracatu	Família dos Amaros
Southeast	MG	Paracatu	Machadinho
Southeast	MG	Paracatu	Pontal
Southeast	MG	Paracatu	São Domingos
Southeast	MG	Paraopeba	Pontinha
Southeast	MG	Passa Tempo	Cachoeira dos Forros
Southeast	MG	Patos de Minas	São Sebastião
Southeast	MG	Paula Cândido	Córrego do Meio
Southeast	MG	Paulistas	Robertos
Southeast	MG	Peçanha	Dos Jorges de Água Branca
Southeast	MG	Pedras de Maria da Cruz	Caraíbas e Ilha da Capivara
Southeast	MG	Pedras de Maria da Cruz	Palmeirinha
Southeast	MG	Pedro Leopoldo	Povoado de Pimentel
Southeast	MG	Periquito	Ilha Funda
Southeast	MG	Pescador	Comunidade dos Ferreiras
Southeast	MG	Piranga	Bacalhau
Southeast	MG	Piranga	Santo Antônio de Pinheiros Altos
Southeast	MG	Piranga	Santo Antônio do Guiné
Southeast	MG	Pitangui	Veloso
Southeast	MG	Pompéu	Saco Barreiro
Southeast	MG	Ponte Nova	Bairro de Fátima
Southeast	MG	Presidente Juscelino	Capão
Southeast	MG	Presidente Kubitschek	Andrequicé
Southeast	MG	Presidente Kubitschek	Raiz
Southeast	MG	Raul Soares	Comunidade dos Bernardos
Southeast	MG	Resende Costa	Curralinho dos Paulas
Southeast	MG	Ressaquinha	Santo Antônio do Morro Grande
Southeast	MG	Riacho dos Machados	Peixe Bravo
Southeast	MG	Ribeirão das Neves	Irmandade do Rosario de Justinópolis
Southeast	MG	Rio Espera	Buraco do Paiol
Southeast	MG	Rio Espera	Moreiras
Southeast	MG	Rio Piracicaba	Caxambu
Southeast	MG	Sabinópolis	Barra/Santo Antônio
Southeast	MG	Sabinópolis	Córrego Mestre
Southeast	MG	Sabinópolis	Maritaca
Southeast	MG	Sabinópolis	Quilombo
Southeast	MG	Sabinópolis	Quilombo Sesmaria
Southeast	MG	Sabinópolis	Santa Bárbara
Southeast	MG	Sabinópolis	São Domingos
Southeast	MG	Salinas	Nova Matrona
Southeast	MG	Salinas	Olaria/Bagre
Southeast	MG	Salto da Divisa	Braço Forte
Southeast	MG	Santa Fé	Fazenda Genipapo/Chalé
Southeast	MG	Santa Helena de Minas	Marcineiros
Southeast	MG	Santa Luzia	Pinhões
Southeast	MG	Santa Maria de Itabira	Barro Preto
Southeast	MG	Santos Dumont	São Sebastião da Boa Vista
Southeast	MG	São Francisco	Benedito Costa
Southeast	MG	São Francisco	Bom Jardim da Prata (Barreira dos Índios, Bom Jardim da Prata, Bom Jardim Mandacaru, Caldeirões, Junco, Corredor, Lagoa da Prata, Lajeado do Acari, Lajedo, Piãozeiro, Porto Velho, Santa Helena e São Francisco de Assis)
Southeast	MG	São Francisco	Buriti do Meio
Southeast	MG	São Francisco	Caraíbas Ii
Southeast	MG	São Francisco	Mestre Minervino
Southeast	MG	São João da Lagoa	Alegre
Southeast	MG	São João da Ponte	Agreste
Southeast	MG	São João da Ponte	Boa Vistinha
Southeast	MG	São João da Ponte	Limeira
Southeast	MG	São João da Ponte	Sete Ladeiras
Southeast	MG	São João da Ponte	Terra Dura
Southeast	MG	São João da Ponte	Vereda Viana e Agreste
Southeast	MG	São João da Ponte, Varzelândia, Verdelândia	Brejo dos Crioulos (Arapuín, Araruba, Cabaceiros, Caxambu, Conrado e Furado Seco)
Southeast	MG	São Romão	Ribanceira (Laranjeira, Coqueiro, Bonfim, Ilha da Martinha, Ilha do Pau Seco e Buritizinho)
Southeast	MG	Senhora do Porto	Moinho Velho
Southeast	MG	Serra do Salitre, Patrocínio, Patos de Minas	Família Teodoro de Oliveira e Ventura
Southeast	MG	Serranópolis de Minas	Brutiá
Southeast	MG	Serranópolis de Minas	Campos
Southeast	MG	Serro	Ausente
Southeast	MG	Serro	Baú
Southeast	MG	Serro	Capivari
Southeast	MG	Serro	Queimadas
Southeast	MG	Serro	Santa Cruz
Southeast	MG	Serro	Vila Nova
Southeast	MG	Setubinha	Quaresma
Southeast	MG	Tabuleiro	Botafogo
Southeast	MG	Teófilo Otoni	São Julião Ii
Southeast	MG	Ubá	Namastê
Southeast	MG	Ubaí	Gerais Velho
Southeast	MG	Urucuia	Baixa Funda
Southeast	MG	Varjão de Minas	Corte
Southeast	MG	Vazante	Bagres
Southeast	MG	Vazante	Bainha
Southeast	MG	Vazante	Cabeludo
Southeast	MG	Vazante	Consciência Negra
Southeast	MG	Veredinha	Monte Alegre
Southeast	MG	Viçosa	Buieié
Southeast	MG	Virgem da Lapa	Alto Jequitibá (Jequitibá, Bugre e Quilombo)
Southeast	MG	Virgem da Lapa	Bela Vista, Córrego do Bonito e Santana
Southeast	MG	Virgem da Lapa	Biquinha e Água Limpa
Southeast	MG	Virgem da Lapa	Cafundó
Southeast	MG	Virgem da Lapa	Campinhos
Southeast	MG	Virgem da Lapa	Capim Puba
Southeast	MG	Virgem da Lapa	Cardoso
Southeast	MG	Virgem da Lapa	Curral Novo
Southeast	MG	Virgem da Lapa	Gravatá e Massacará
Southeast	MG	Virgem da Lapa	Limoeiro
Southeast	MG	Virgem da Lapa	Malhada Branca
Southeast	MG	Virgem da Lapa	Mutuca de Baixo, Lavrinha, Pacheco, Córrego do Brejo e Morro Redondo
Southeast	MG	Virgem da Lapa	Onça
Southeast	MG	Virgem da Lapa	Pega
Southeast	MG	Virgem da Lapa	Quilombo das Almas
Southeast	MG	Virgem da Lapa	São José
Southeast	MG	Virgem da Lapa	União dos Rosários
Southeast	MG	Virgem da Lapa	Vai-Vi, Coqueiros e Ouro Fino
Southeast	MG	Virgem da Lapa	Vereda
Southeast	MG	Virgolândia	Águas Claras
Southeast	MG	Visconde do Rio Branco	Bom Jardim
Southeast	MG	Bonito de Minas	Mandus
Southeast	MG	Bonito de Minas	Vargem Grande
Southeast	RJ	Angra dos Reis	Santa Rita Bracui
Southeast	RJ	Angra dos Reis, Rio Claro	Alto da Serra do Mar
Southeast	RJ	Araruama	Sobara
Southeast	RJ	Araruama	Tapinoã -Prodígio
Southeast	RJ	Areal	Boa Esperança
Southeast	RJ	Armação dos Búzios	Bahia Formosa
Southeast	RJ	Armação dos Búzios	Rasa
Southeast	RJ	Cabo Frio	Botafogo
Southeast	RJ	Cabo Frio	Fazenda Espirito Santo
Southeast	RJ	Cabo Frio	Maria Joaquina
Southeast	RJ	Cabo Frio	Maria Romana
Southeast	RJ	Cabo Frio	Preto Forro
Southeast	RJ	Cabo Frio, São Pedro da Aldeia	Caveira
Southeast	RJ	Campos dos Goytacazes	Aleluia
Southeast	RJ	Campos dos Goytacazes	Batatal
Southeast	RJ	Campos dos Goytacazes	Cambucá
Southeast	RJ	Campos dos Goytacazes	Conceição de Imbé
Southeast	RJ	Campos dos Goytacazes	Custodópolis
Southeast	RJ	Campos dos Goytacazes	Lagoa Fea
Southeast	RJ	Campos dos Goytacazes	Sossego
Southeast	RJ	Magé	Bongaba
Southeast	RJ	Magé	Feital
Southeast	RJ	Magé	Maria Conga
Southeast	RJ	Mangaratiba	Fazenda Santa Justina/Santa Isabel
Southeast	RJ	Mangaratiba	Ilha de Marambaia
Southeast	RJ	Natividade	Cruzeirinho
Southeast	RJ	Niterói	Grotão
Southeast	RJ	Paraty	Cabral
Southeast	RJ	Paraty	Campinho da Independência
Southeast	RJ	Paraty	Guiti
Southeast	RJ	Petrópolis	Tapera
Southeast	RJ	Quatis	Santana
Southeast	RJ	Quissamã	Machadinha
Southeast	RJ	Rio de Janeiro	Cafundá Astrogilda
Southeast	RJ	Rio de Janeiro	Camorim - Maciço da Pedra Branca
Southeast	RJ	Rio de Janeiro	Dona Bilina
Southeast	RJ	Rio de Janeiro	Família Pinto - Sacopã
Southeast	RJ	Rio de Janeiro	Pedra Bonita
Southeast	RJ	Rio de Janeiro	Pedra do Sal
Southeast	RJ	Rio de Janeiro	Comunidade Quilombola Guandu-Mirim
Southeast	RJ	São Fidélis	São Benedito
Southeast	RJ	São Francisco de Itabapoana	Barrinha
Southeast	RJ	São Francisco de Itabapoana	Deserto Feliz
Southeast	RJ	Valença	São José da Serra
Southeast	SP	Agudos	Espírito Santo da Fortaleza de Porcinos
Southeast	SP	Barra do Turvo	Cedro
Southeast	SP	Barra do Turvo	Ilhas
Southeast	SP	Barra do Turvo	Paraíso e Pedra Preta
Southeast	SP	Barra do Turvo	Reginaldo
Southeast	SP	Barra do Turvo	Ribeirão Grande
Southeast	SP	Barra do Turvo	Terra Seca
Southeast	SP	Cananéia	Ariri
Southeast	SP	Cananéia	Mandira
Southeast	SP	Cananéia	Porto Cubatão
Southeast	SP	Cananéia	Rio das Minas
Southeast	SP	Cananéia	Santa Maria
Southeast	SP	Cananéia	São Paulo Bagre
Southeast	SP	Cananéia	Taquari
Southeast	SP	Cananéia	Varadouro
Southeast	SP	Capivari	Capivari
Southeast	SP	Eldorado	Abobral
Southeast	SP	Eldorado	André Lopes
Southeast	SP	Eldorado	Bairro das Ostras
Southeast	SP	Eldorado	Engenho
Southeast	SP	Eldorado	Ivaporunduva
Southeast	SP	Eldorado	Nhunguará
Southeast	SP	Eldorado	Pedro Cubas
Southeast	SP	Eldorado	Pedro Cubas de Cima
Southeast	SP	Eldorado	Poça
Southeast	SP	Eldorado	Sapatu
Southeast	SP	Eldorado, Iporanga	Galvão
Southeast	SP	Eldorado, Iporanga	São Pedro
Southeast	SP	Iguape	Aldeia
Southeast	SP	Iguape, Juquiá	Morro Seco
Southeast	SP	Iporanga	Bombas
Southeast	SP	Iporanga	Castelhanos
Southeast	SP	Iporanga	Maria Rosa
Southeast	SP	Iporanga	Piloes
Southeast	SP	Iporanga	Piririca
Southeast	SP	Iporanga	Praia Grande
Southeast	SP	Iporanga, Itaóca	Porto Velho
Southeast	SP	Itaóca	Cangume
Southeast	SP	Itapeva	Jaó
Southeast	SP	Itararé	Fazenda Silvério
Southeast	SP	Itatiba	Brotas
Southeast	SP	Pilar do Sul	Fazenda Pilar
Southeast	SP	Registro	Bairro Peropava
Southeast	SP	Salto de Pirapora	Cafundó
Southeast	SP	Salto de Pirapora, Votorantim	José Joaquim de Camargo
Southeast	SP	São Roque	Carmo
Southeast	SP	Sarapuí	Terras de Caxambu
Southeast	SP	Ubatuba	Frade, Raposa, Caçandoquinha e Saco das Bananas
Southeast	SP	Ubatuba	Caçandoca
Southeast	SP	Ubatuba	Cambury
Southeast	SP	Ubatuba	Fazenda Caixa
Southeast	SP	Ubatuba	Sertão do Itamambuca
South	PR	Adrianópolis	Bairro Córrego do Franco
South	PR	Adrianópolis	Bairro Três Canais
South	PR	Adrianópolis	Córrego das Moças
South	PR	Adrianópolis	Estreitinho
South	PR	Adrianópolis	João Surá
South	PR	Adrianópolis	Porto Velho
South	PR	Adrianópolis	Praia do Peixe
South	PR	Adrianópolis	São João
South	PR	Adrianópolis	Sete Barras
South	PR	Arapoti	Família Xavier
South	PR	Bocaiúva do Sul	Areia Branca
South	PR	Campo Largo	Palmital dos Pretos
South	PR	Candói	Cavernoso 1
South	PR	Candói	Despraiado
South	PR	Candói	Vila São Tomé
South	PR	Castro	Serra do Apon, Limitão e Mamans
South	PR	Castro	Tronco
South	PR	Curiúva	Água Morna
South	PR	Curiúva	Guajuvira
South	PR	Doutor Ulysses	Varzeão
South	PR	Guaíra	Manoel Ciriáco dos Santos
South	PR	Guaraqueçaba	Batuva
South	PR	Guaraqueçaba	Rio Verde
South	PR	Ivaí	Rio do Meio
South	PR	Ivaí	São Roque
South	PR	Lapa	Feixo
South	PR	Lapa	Restinga
South	PR	Lapa	Vila Esperança de Mariental
South	PR	Palmas	Adelaide Maria Trindade Batista
South	PR	Palmas	Castorina Maria da Conceição
South	PR	Palmas	Tobias Ferreira
South	PR	Pinhão, Guarapuava, Reserva do Iguaçu	Invernada Paiol de Telha
South	PR	Ponta Grossa	Santa Cruz
South	PR	Ponta Grossa	Sutil
South	PR	São Miguel do Iguaçu	Apepú
South	PR	Turvo	Campina dos Morenos
South	RS	Aceguá	Tamanduá
South	RS	Aceguá	Vila da Lata
South	RS	Alegrete	Angico
South	RS	Arroio do Meio	São Roque
South	RS	Arroio do Padre	Vila Progresso
South	RS	Arroio do Tigre	Linha Fão e Sítio Novo
South	RS	Bagé	Palmas
South	RS	Butiá	Butiá
South	RS	Caçapava do Sul	Picada das Vassouras (Picada das Vassouras/Quebra Canga, Rincão Bonito/Seivalzinho e Faxinal)
South	RS	Cachoeira do Sul	Cambará
South	RS	Cachoeira do Sul	Rincão do Irapuazinho
South	RS	Candiota	Candiota
South	RS	Canguçu	Armada
South	RS	Canguçu	Bisa Vicente
South	RS	Canguçu	Boqueirão
South	RS	Canguçu	Cerro da Boneca
South	RS	Canguçu	Cerro da Vigília
South	RS	Canguçu	Cerro das Velhas
South	RS	Canguçu	Estância da Figueira
South	RS	Canguçu	Favila
South	RS	Canguçu	Faxinal
South	RS	Canguçu	Filhos dos Quilombos
South	RS	Canguçu	Iguatemi
South	RS	Canguçu	Maçambique
South	RS	Canguçu	Manoel do Rêgo
South	RS	Canguçu	Passo do Lourenço
South	RS	Canguçu	Potreiro Grande
South	RS	Canguçu	Santa Clara e Arredores
South	RS	Canoas	Chácara Barreto
South	RS	Capivari do Sul	Costa da Lagoa
South	RS	Carazinho	Flor da Serra
South	RS	Catuípe	Passo do Araçá
South	RS	Cerrito	Emília de Moraes
South	RS	Cerrito	Lichiguana
South	RS	Cerro Grande do Sul	Vila Joaquina
South	RS	Cerro Grande do Sul	Vila Ventura
South	RS	Colorado	Vila Padre Osmari
South	RS	Colorado	Vista Alegre
South	RS	Cristal	Serrinha do Cristal
South	RS	Dona Francisca	Acácio Flores
South	RS	Encruzilhada do Sul	Medeiros
South	RS	Encruzilhada do Sul	Quadra
South	RS	Formigueiro	Maria Joaquina
South	RS	Formigueiro	Passos dos Brum
South	RS	Formigueiro	Passos dos Maias
South	RS	Formigueiro	Timbaúva
South	RS	Fortaleza dos Valos	Capão dos Lopes
South	RS	Fortaleza dos Valos	Costaneira
South	RS	General Câmara	Vila do Sabugueiro
South	RS	Giruá	Correa
South	RS	Gravataí	Ferreira Fialho
South	RS	Gravataí	Manoel Barbosa
South	RS	Jacuizinho, Tunas	Novo Horizonte/Rincão dos Caixões
South	RS	Jaguarão	Madeira
South	RS	Lagoão	Vila Miloca
South	RS	Lajeado	Unidos do Lajeado
South	RS	Lavras do Sul	Corredor dos Munhós
South	RS	Maquiné, Osório	Morro Alto
South	RS	Morro Redondo	Vó Ernestina
South	RS	Mostardas	Casca
South	RS	Mostardas	Colodianos
South	RS	Mostardas	Teixeira
South	RS	Muitos Capões	Mato Grande
South	RS	Nova Palma	Rincão do Santo Inácio
South	RS	Palmares do Sul	Limoeiro
South	RS	Pântano Grande	Gonçalves da Silva
South	RS	Pedras Altas	Bolsa do Candiota
South	RS	Pedras Altas	Solidão
South	RS	Pedras Altas	Várzea dos Baianos
South	RS	Pelotas	Algodão
South	RS	Pelotas	Alto do Caixão
South	RS	Pelotas	Cerrito Alegre
South	RS	Pelotas	Vó Elvira
South	RS	Piratini	Brasa Moura
South	RS	Piratini	Faxina
South	RS	Piratini	Fazenda da Cachoeira
South	RS	Piratini	Nicanor da Luz
South	RS	Piratini	Raulino Lessa
South	RS	Piratini	Rincão do Couro
South	RS	Piratini	Rincão do Quilombo
South	RS	Piratini	São Manoel
South	RS	Portão	Bom Jardim
South	RS	Portão	Macaco Branco
South	RS	Porto Alegre	Alpes
South	RS	Porto Alegre	Areal
South	RS	Porto Alegre	Família de Ouro
South	RS	Porto Alegre	Família Fidelix
South	RS	Porto Alegre	Família Flores
South	RS	Porto Alegre	Família Lemos
South	RS	Porto Alegre	Família Machado
South	RS	Porto Alegre	Família Silva
South	RS	Porto Alegre	Kédi
South	RS	Porto Alegre	Mocambo
South	RS	Porto Alegre	Santa Luzia
South	RS	Restinga Seca	Rincão dos Martinianos
South	RS	Restinga Seca	São Miguel
South	RS	Restinga Seca	Vó Fermina e Vó Maria Eulina
South	RS	Rio Grande	Macanudos
South	RS	Rio Pardo	Rincão dos Negros
South	RS	Rodeio Bonito	Bino
South	RS	Rosário do Sul	Rincão da Chirca
South	RS	Rosário do Sul	Rincão dos Negros
South	RS	Salto do Jacuí	Júlio Borges
South	RS	Salto do Jacuí	Quilombolas Urbanos do Jacuí
South	RS	Santa Maria	Arnesto Penna Carneiro
South	RS	Santa Maria	Recanto dos Evangélicos
South	RS	Santana da Boa Vista	Tio Dô
South	RS	Sant'ana do Livramento	Ibicuí da Armada
South	RS	São Gabriel	Caleira
South	RS	São Gabriel	Cerro do Ouro
South	RS	São Gabriel	Von Bock
South	RS	São José do Norte	Vila Nova
South	RS	São Lourenço do Sul	Coxilha Negra
South	RS	São Lourenço do Sul	Monjolo
South	RS	São Lourenço do Sul	Picada
South	RS	São Lourenço do Sul	Rincão das Almas
South	RS	São Lourenço do Sul	Torrão
South	RS	São Sepé	Fundos do Formigueiro
South	RS	São Sepé	Ipê
South	RS	São Sepé	Passos dos Brum
South	RS	Sarandi	Beira Campo
South	RS	Sertão	Arvinha
South	RS	Sertão	Mormaça
South	RS	Tapes	Chácara da Cruz
South	RS	Taquara	Paredão
South	RS	Tavares	Anastácia Machado
South	RS	Tavares	Capororocas
South	RS	Tavares	Vó Marinha
South	RS	Terra de Areia	Boa Vista
South	RS	Terra de Areia	Zâmbia
South	RS	Três Forquilhas	Famílias de Três Forquilhas
South	RS	Triunfo	Morada da Paz
South	RS	Turuçu	Mutuca
South	RS	Uruguaiana	Rincão dos Fernandes
South	RS	Vale Verde	Santos Rocha
South	RS	Viamão	Anastácia
South	RS	Viamão	Cantão das Lombas
South	RS	Viamão	Peixoto dos Botinhas
South	SC	Abdon Batista, Campos Novos	Invernada dos Negros
South	SC	Araquari	Areias Pequenas
South	SC	Araquari	Itapocu
South	SC	Balneário Camboriú	Morro do Boi
South	SC	Capivari de Baixo	Ilhotinha
South	SC	Florianópolis	Vidal Martins
South	SC	Garopaba	Aldeia
South	SC	Garopaba	Morro do Fortunato
South	SC	Joinville	Beco do Caminho Curto
South	SC	Joinville	Ribeirão do Cubatão
South	SC	Monte Carlo	Campo dos Poli
South	SC	Paulo Lopes	Santa Cruz
South	SC	Porto Belo	Valongo
South	SC	Praia Grande, Mampituba	São Roque
South	SC	Santo Amaro da Imperatriz	Caldas do Cubatão
South	SC	Santo Amaro da Imperatriz	Tabuleiro
South	SC	São Francisco do Sul	Tapera
South	SC	Treze de Maio	Família Thomaz
