= Tijuaçu Quilombola Community =

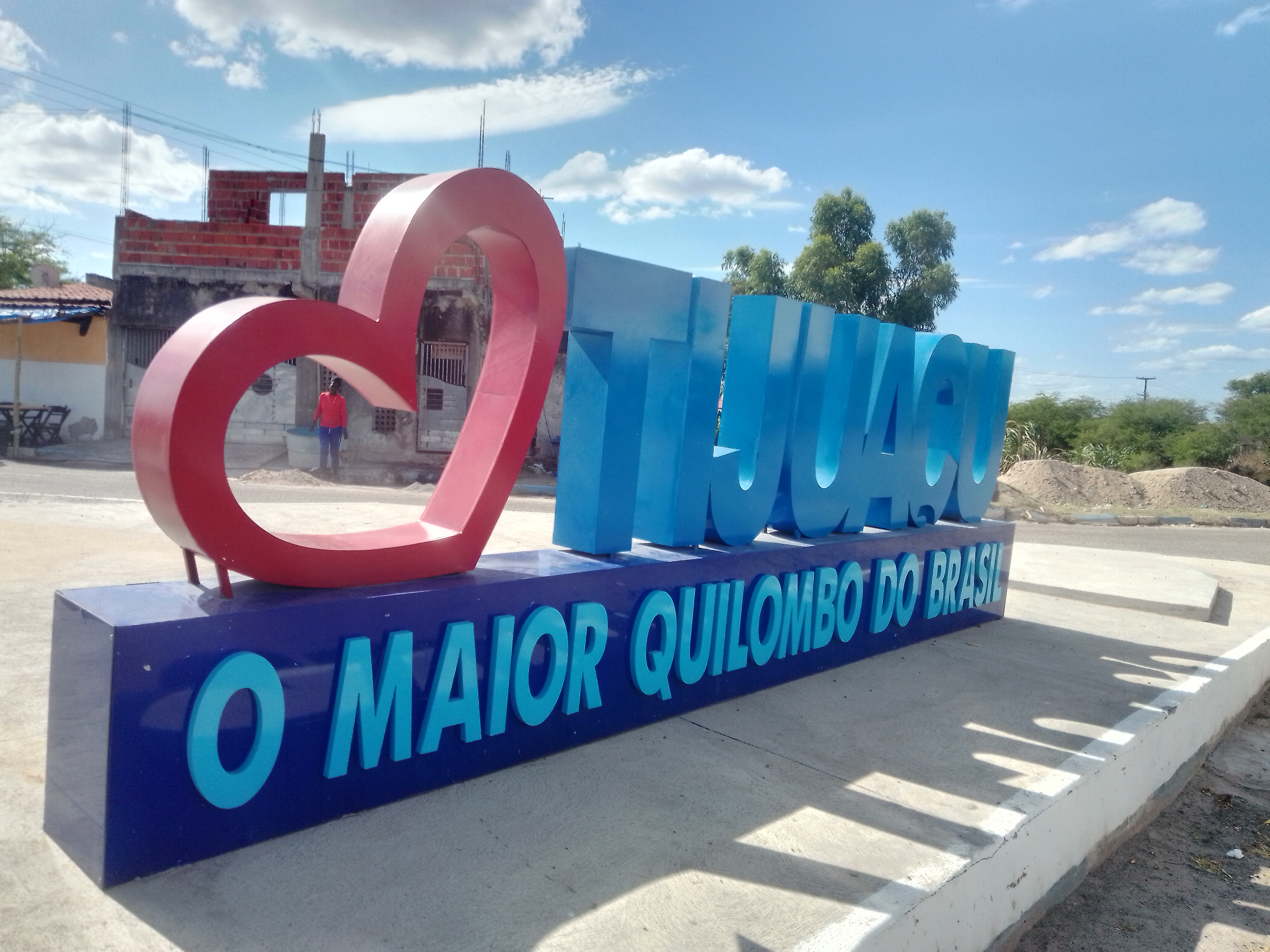
Sign at the entrance to the Quilombo of Tijuaçu

Tijuaçu is a quilombo remnant community, a traditional Brazilian population, located in the Brazilian municipalities of Senhor do Bonfim , Filadélfia and Antonio Gonçalves, in Bahia. The Tijuaçu community consists of a population of 828 families, distributed over an area of 8472.2214 hectares. The territory was certified as a quilombo remnant (historical remnants of former quilombos) by the Palmares Cultural Foundation, by Ordinance No. 28/2005.

This community had its Technical Identification and Delimitation Report published in 2010 (a stage of land regularization), but its land tenure situation is still under review (not titled) at INCRA.

The community was founded at the beginning of the 19th century by Maria Rodrigues, known as “Mariinha”, of the Nagô nation. She escaped from a slave quarters in Salvador and settled in Alto Bonito. After marrying a man from Congo, they founded the quilombo on land formerly belonging to the Lagarto Farm, owned by Felipe Rodrigues da Silva and Joaquim Manoel de Santana. According to testimonies, there were many lizards in the region, and that is why the community's name is Tijuaçu: it means “big lizard” in the language of the region's Indians.

== Territorial situation ==
Until the end of the 20th century, the quilombola community of Tijuaçu was called "Lagarto" and was located in Campo Formoso. At the end of the 19th century, there were 25 thatched houses and 30 families. In 1953, it became part of Senhor do Bonfim.

The lack of land title (land regularization) creates difficulties for quilombola communities in developing agriculture, in addition to conflicts with farmers in their regions and the impossibility of requesting social and urban policies to improve living conditions, such as urban infrastructure for energy, water and sewage networks.
