= Capão das Gamelas =

Capão das Gamelas is a quilombo remnant community, a traditional Brazilian population, located in the Brazilian municipality of Seabra, in Bahia. The Capão das Gamelas community consists of a population of 222 people (60 families), distributed over an area of 1,315.4872 hectares. The territory was certified as a quilombo remnant (historical remnants of former quilombos) on November 9, 2005, by the Palmares Cultural Foundation.

This community had its Technical Identification and Delimitation Report published in 2011 (a stage of land regularization), but its land tenure situation is still under analysis (not titled) at INCRA. On November 16, 2016, the area of 1,315.4872 hectares was titled by the Coordination of Agrarian Development of Bahia (CDA-BA). On March 10, 2017, the community received the land regularization title for its territory.

== Territorial situation ==
Land title (land regularization) allows the community to face fewer difficulties in developing agriculture (such as conflicts over land ownership with farmers in the region where it is located), to apply for environmental permits for its territory, and to request social and urban policies to improve its living conditions, such as urban infrastructure for energy, water, and sewage networks.

"We are historical and we need to preserve the roots and culture of the African people. The title means everything to me. It is a guarantee that we are officially recognized as the owners of the land, our roots and values must be preserved in this place." (Edilson Jorge da Silva, member of the quilombola community of Capão das Gamelas)
