= Quilombo do Bananal =

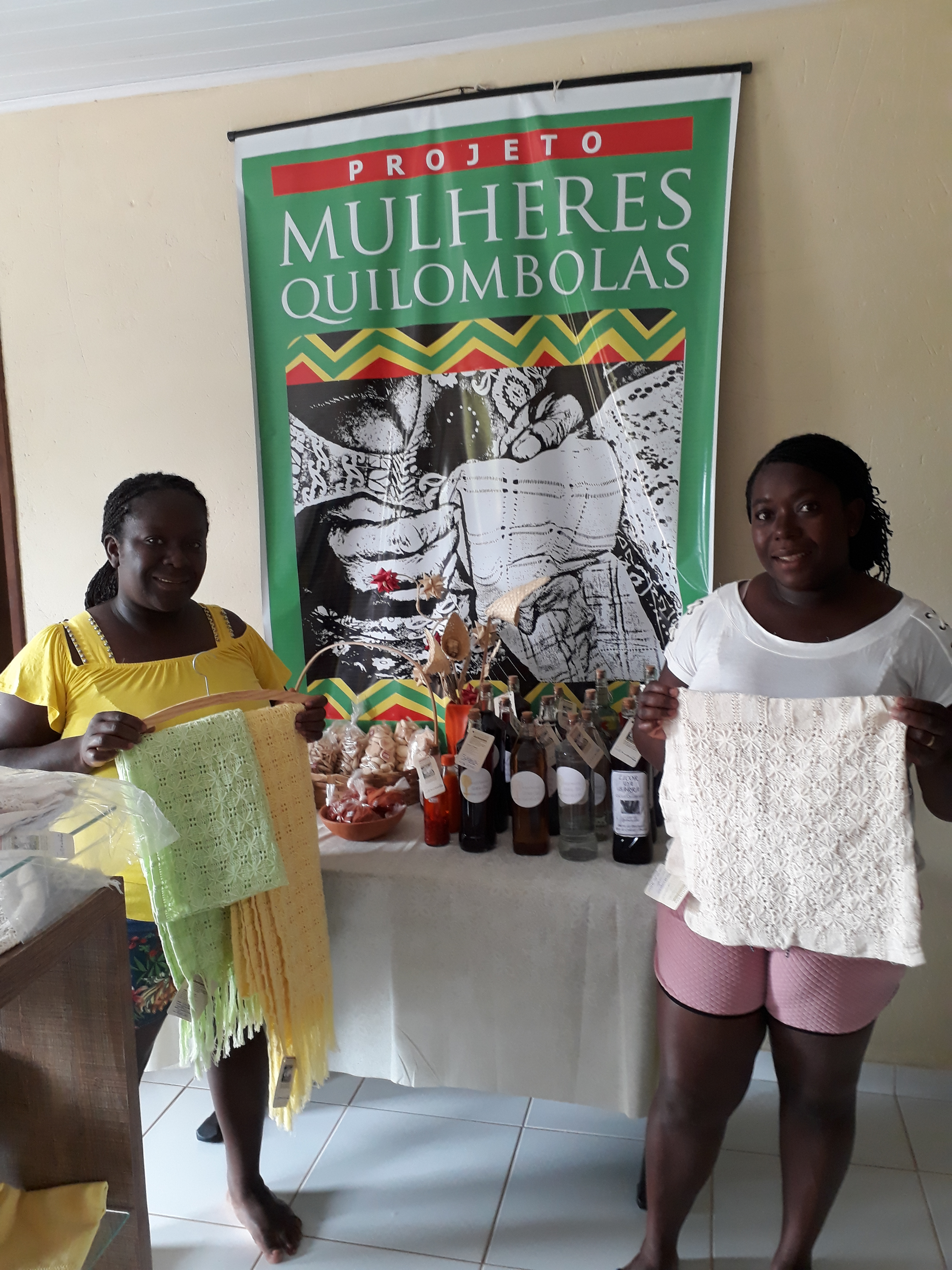
Craftswomen displaying fabric items, beverages, and snacks in Bananal Quilombola Community

Bananal is a quilombola community located in the Brazilian municipality of Rio de Contas, in the Chapada Diamantina region, in the interior of the state of Bahia.

The village is one of the city's tourist attractions, with tours also including the Ponte do Coronel, the village of Mato Grosso and the other remaining quilombo community of Barra do Brumado. The community was certified as a quilombo remnant by the Palmares Cultural Foundation (FCP) on September 12, 2005 under process number 01420.000054/1998-92.

== Local characteristics ==
It is a rural community that carries in its oral traditions the information that they are not descended from slaves, but from free blacks, in such a way that its inhabitants present this as a differentiating factor in relation to other people: "The original memory of the people always seems to describe a common past in which the ancestors 'had' to come to that place, while the others remained 'captive' elsewhere: 'There, behind the floodplain, were the blacks.'; 'On the other side of the river were the captives.'; 'Yes, there were captives, yes, but not here, there were never any captives, no'" leading to the conclusion that there exists "non-submission to either the condition of slavery or the idea of slavery".

Their economic activities remain focused on agriculture and small-scale livestock farming, although the greater integration provided by the modernization of communications leads new generations to acquire new habits and ways of seeing the world. The attachment to the land, common in the quilombos of Bahia, is quite strong there.

In Bananal, the remnants of isolation and consequent consanguineous marriage among its inhabitants are still perceptible.

It is situated near the village of Mato Grosso, with residents descended from bandeirantes and allegedly of Portuguese and white origin, and about 2.5 km away from the quilombo of Barra do Brumado, accessible by dirt roads, and bathed by an unnamed stream. Near these two communities there was a third, Riacho das Pedras, which, controversially, was flooded by the Brumado Dam and had its residents dispersed.

In Bananal there is a communal flour mill. In 2007, seven of the twenty-three dwellings that made up the community were located in "Praça de Bananal," along with the Church of Our Lady of the Conception and the ruins of an older temple.
