= Quilombo de Morro Redondo =

- Location within Brazil
- Establishment: 1880
- Recognition as a quilombola community: 2017

Area
  - Total: 5,068.9163 ha (12,525.565 acres)

Population
  - Total: 67 families

Morro Redondo is a quilombo remnant community, a traditional Brazilian population, located in the Brazilian municipality of Seabra, in Chapada Diamantina, Bahia. The Morro Redondo community consists of a population of 67 families, distributed across an area of 5,068.9163 hectares. The territory was certified as a quilombo remnant (historical remnants of former quilombos) in 2017 by the Palmares Cultural Foundation.

This community had its Technical Identification and Delimitation Report published in 2012 (a stage of land regularization), but its land tenure situation is still under review (not titled) at INCRA.

== Listing ==
The listing of quilombos as protected heritage sites is provided for by the Brazilian Constitution of 1988, requiring only certification by the Palmares Cultural Foundation:

Article 216. The following constitute Brazilian cultural heritage: tangible and intangible assets, considered individually or collectively, that are bearers of reference to the identity, actions, and memory of the different groups that formed Brazilian society [...] § 5. All documents and sites containing historical reminiscences of the former quilombos are hereby declared protected.

Therefore, the quilombola community of Morro Redondo is a Brazilian cultural heritage, given that it received certification as a "historical reminiscence of an old quilombo" from the Palmares Cultural Foundation in 2017.

== The origin ==
Morro Redondo was a focal point for mining, mineral exploration for gold and precious stones. According to the anthropological report, in the 18th century, African slaves of the Bantu and Jeje ethnicity were taken to the site to work in diamond mining.

The Quilombola community of Morro Redondo was founded by the slave Timóteo Cardoso around 1880. The name “Morro Redondo” refers to a mountain range located in the community.

== Education ==
In Morro Redondo, educational institutions are scarce, with only one public school, the Professor Sa Teles Municipal School, which is a municipal-type school. Typically, municipal, state, and federal schools are not tuition fees.

Address: Povoado Do Morro Redondo, Sn Predio. Rural Area. 46900-000 Seabra – Bahia, Brazil.

Coordinates: @-12.524476,-42.000866,16z

Contact phone number: (75) 33312211

== Territorial situation ==
The lack of land title (land regularization) creates difficulties for quilombola communities in developing agriculture, in addition to conflicts with farmers in their regions and the impossibility of requesting social and urban policies to improve living conditions, such as urban infrastructure for energy, water and sewage networks.

=== Agricultural cultivation ===
Corn, cassava, castor beans, coffee, and beans are planted for subsistence.

=== Culture ===
Traditional Peoples or Traditional Communities are groups that have a culture distinct from the predominant local culture, maintaining a way of life closely linked to the natural environment in which they live. Through their own forms of social organization, use of territory and natural resources (with a subsistence relationship ), their socio-cultural-religious reproduction utilizes knowledge transmitted orally and in daily practice.

One of the exponents of the intangible cultural heritage of the Morro Redondo community is the “Boi de Mariá”. According to the oral tradition of the region, the celebration has existed for over a hundred years, beginning with a promise made by an old resident (who was called Mariá) so that the quilombo's water well would not dry up. On June 23rd, the dancers appear in the costumes of the ox and masked figures, and begin the ceremonies in the streets of the quilombo accompanied by singing and rituals.

== The historical collection ==
In addition to the history of this quilombo being preserved in the memories of the oldest residents and passed down to new generations, the quilombo's traditions can be explored at the Casa do Quilombo, which features utensils and work materials used by its inhabitants, as well as a large photographic collection.

== Climate, relief and vegetation ==
The vegetation of the Morro Redondo mountain range is basically composed of plants adapted to the dry climate (typical of the Caatinga biome), without constant rainfall. The main plant species are Mandacaru, Aroeira, Braúna, and Xique-xique.

Biome: Caatinga.

Population: 67 Families.

Area: 5,068 hectares (50.68 km²)

Topography of the region:

- Minimum altitude: 1,111 meters above sea level.
- Average altitude: 1,125 meters above sea level.
- Maximum altitude: 1,254 meters above sea level.
