= Nova Batalhinha Quilombola Community =

Quilombo community in Bom Jesus da Lapa, Bahia, Brazil

Nova Batalhinha is a quilombo remnant community, a traditional Brazilian population, located in the Brazilian municipality of Bom Jesus da Lapa , in Bahia. The Nova Batalhinha community consists of a population of 20 families, distributed across an area of 7,473 hectares. The territory was certified as a quilombo remnant (historical remnants of former quilombos) by the Palmares Cultural Foundation, Ordinance No. 35/2004.

The community was formed by migrations from the communities of Rio das Rãs, Pituba and Batalha, due to droughts or for better survival conditions. The community was established near the Rio das Rãs, a tributary of the São Francisco River.

This community had its Technical Identification and Delimitation Report published in 2006 (a stage of land regularization), but its land tenure situation is still under analysis (not titled) at INCRA. The expropriation of the lands was published on November 20, 2009. Its territory is composed of 10 former rural properties (which, in 2013, were acquired by INCRA for R$ 155,000), the Pitombeira settlement (created in 2004) and Union areas near the São Francisco River. The Contract for the Concession of Real Right of Use (CCDRU) of the lands of the quilombola community of Nova Batalhinha was delivered in August 2017 (provisional possession until the legal conclusion of the expropriations).

== Listing ==
The listing of quilombos as protected heritage sites is provided for by the Brazilian Constitution of 1988, requiring only certification by the Palmares Cultural Foundation:

Article 216. The following constitute Brazilian cultural heritage: tangible and intangible assets, considered individually or collectively, that are bearers of reference to the identity, actions, and memory of the different groups that formed Brazilian society [...] § 5. All documents and sites containing historical reminiscences of the former quilombos are hereby declared protected.

Therefore, the quilombola community of Nova Batalhinha is a Brazilian cultural heritage, given that it received certification as a "historical reminiscence of an old quilombo" from the Palmares Cultural Foundation in 2004.

== Territorial situation ==
The lack of land title (land regularization) creates difficulties for quilombola communities in developing agriculture, in addition to conflicts with farmers in their regions and the impossibility of requesting social and urban policies to improve living conditions, such as urban infrastructure for energy, water and sewage networks. In 2017, INCRA signed a technical note regulating the registration and selection of quilombola farmers for access to social inclusion and productive development policies of the National Agrarian Reform Program (PNRA).

Traditional Peoples or Traditional Communities are groups that have a culture distinct from the predominant local culture, maintaining a way of life closely linked to the natural environment in which they live. Through their own forms of social organization, use of territory and natural resources (with a subsistence relationship ), their socio-cultural-religious reproduction utilizes knowledge transmitted orally and in daily practice.
