= Velame Quilombola Community =

Velame is a quilombo remnant community, a traditional Brazilian population, located in the Brazilian municipality of Vitória da Conquista, in Bahia. The Velame community consists of a population of 73 families, distributed across an area of 1874.17 hectares. The territory was certified as a quilombo remnant (historical remnants of former quilombos) by the Palmares Cultural Foundation, by Decree No. 38534, of 04/19/2005.

This community had its Technical Identification and Delimitation Report published in 2010 (a stage of land regularization), but its land tenure situation is still under review (not titled) at INCRA.

== Listing ==
The listing of quilombos as protected heritage sites is provided for by the Brazilian Constitution of 1988, requiring only certification by the Palmares Cultural Foundation:

Article 216. The following constitute Brazilian cultural heritage: tangible and intangible assets, considered individually or collectively, that are bearers of reference to the identity, actions, and memory of the different groups that formed Brazilian society [...] § 5. All documents and sites containing historical reminiscences of the former quilombos are hereby declared protected.

Therefore, the quilombola community of Velame is a Brazilian cultural heritage, given that it received certification as a "historical reminiscence of an old quilombo" from the Palmares Cultural Foundation in 2005.

== History ==
Benedito Fortunato da França and his wife, Maria Senhoria de Jesus, started the quilombola community of Velame in the late 1870s, due to the growth of their family. They bought the land with the money from the sale of their portion of the Furadinho quilombola community. In 1937, Maria passed away. Benedito divided the land among his 13 children and moved to the Pau de Espinhos community, in the city of Belo Campo. There he started a new family with two more children.

To pay for the costs of dividing the land, Benedito sold six alqueires of the Velame quilombo to Josefino Ferraz de Oliveira, who moved there with his family. And, after Benedito's death in 1940, Josefino began to expropriate the community's lands, claiming that he had bought 40 alqueires (using Benedito's possession document, borrowed from one of his daughters, a cousin of his who worked at the registry office forged a document with his name). When fencing off the lands, Josefino did so in an area of 60 alqueires.
