= List of quilombola territories =

The following is a list of quilombola territories as designated by the Palmares Cultural Foundation and awarded land title by the Instituto Nacional de Colonização e Reforma Agrária through the provisions of the 1988 Constitution. In addition, this list may include territories which received title through state-level agricultural reform agencies. This is not to be confused with the larger list of quilombola communities throughout Brazil, most of which are designated by the Palmares Cultural Foundation but not awarded land title by INCRA or equivalent state agencies.

A quilombola territory is an area which is historically settled by a community of quilombola descended from a historic quilombo, or settlement of escapees from plantation slavery in Brazil, and in which the quilombola community hold communal land title. Despite living in these areas for as long as hundreds of years, as well as the federal Constitution's recognition of the right of quilombolas to communal land title, much of the historic lands claimed by quilombolas are not recognized by various levels of government.

== Issuing bodies ==
The following institutions issue or have issued land title recognition to quilombola communities:

- INCRA: Instituto Nacional de Colonização e Reforma Agrária (national)
- ITERPA: Pará Land Institute
- ITERMA: Maranhão Institute of Colonization and Land
- ITERPE: Pernambuco State Land and Agrarian Reform Institute
- CDA: Agrarian Development Coordination
- FCP: Palmares Cultural Foundation
- SEHAF: Secretary of State of Qualification and Land Affairs (Rio de Janeiro)
- INTERPI: Piauí Land Institute
- ITESP: São Paulo State Land Institute
- INTERBA: Bahia Land Institute
- CEMIG: Minas Gerais Energy Company
- ITERJ: Rio de Janeiro State Land and Cartography Institute
- SPU: Union Heritage Secretariat
- ITERTINS: Tocantins State Land Institute
- IDATERRA: Institute of Agrarian Development and Rural Extension of Mato Grosso do Sul
- PM: Municipal Mayor of a city

== List ==
Quilombola territories titled or in the process of being titled in Brazil.
Order	quilombola land	Communities	County	State	Issuing body	Families	Claimed area (ha)	Title Size (ha)	Title date (dd/mm/year)	Notes
84	2nd District of Porto Grande	Itabatinga, Mangabeira, Porto Grande, Santo Antônio de Viseu, São Benedito de Viseu, Uxizal, Vizânia	Mocajuba	Pará	ITERPA	400	17,220.3792	17,220.3792	02/12/2008	
9	Abacatal - Aurá	Abacatal - Aurá	Ananindeua	Pará	ITERPA	53	583.2838	317,9366	13/05/1999	
9	Abacatal - Aurá	Abacatal - Aurá	Ananindeua	Pará	ITERPA	53	583.2838	265,3472	02/12/2008	
173	Acauã	Acauã	Poço Branco	Rio Grande do Norte	INCRA	64	540,5138	22,9715	24/05/2018	Current title is 11% of claimed area
173	Acauã	Acauã	Poço Branco	Rio Grande do Norte	INCRA	64	540,5138	17,7182	22/04/2024	Current title is 11% of claimed area
173	Acauã	Acauã	Poço Branco	Rio Grande do Norte	INCRA	64	540,5138	21,2424	22/04/2024	Current title is 11% of claimed area
193	Achuí	Achuí	Santa Helena and Pinheiro	Maranhão	ITERMA	40	1.064,2147	1.064,2147	31/03/2022	
2	Água Fria	Água Fria	Oriximiná	Pará	INCRA	15	557.1355	557.1355	20/11/1996	
104	Aguiar	Aguiar	Viana	Maranhão	ITERMA	50	906,4145	906,4145	22/08/2011	
135	Agreste	Agreste	Seabra	Bahia	CDA	72	2.340,5536	2.340,5536	27/09/2014	
147	Algodões	Algodões	Jussara	Bahia	CDA	102	4.193,8079	4.193,8079	12/12/2014	
235	Aliança e Santa Joana	Aliança e Santa Joana	Cururupu	Maranhão	INCRA	221	7.626,2492	3.982,5215	25/03/2024	
235	Aliança e Santa Joana	Aliança e Santa Joana	Cururupu	Maranhão	INCRA	221	7.626,2492	1.785,4069	25/03/2024	
235	Aliança e Santa Joana	Aliança e Santa Joana	Cururupu	Maranhão	INCRA	221	7.626,2492	1.277,3649	25/03/2024	
235	Aliança e Santa Joana	Aliança e Santa Joana	Cururupu	Maranhão	INCRA	221	7.626,2492	580,9559	25/03/2024	
45	Altamira	Altamira	Pinheiro	Maranhão	ITERMA	68	1220.9398	1220.9398	27/12/2005	
202	Alto Acará	Alto Acará	Acará	Pará	ITERPA	102	12.409,4000	12.409,4000	13/09/2022	
38	Alto Trombetas	Abuí, Paraná do Abuí, Santo Antônio do Abuizinho, Sacred Heart, Tapagem, Mãe Cué	Oriximin	Pará	ITERPA	155	79,095.5912	79,095.5912	20/11/2003	
222	América	América	Bragança	Pará	ITERPA	100	106,9587	106,9587	09/11/2023	
234	Angical	Angical	Colônia do Piauí	Piauí	INTERPI	90	443,9860	2,6011	17/01/2024	
234	Angical	Angical	Colônia do Piauí	Piauí	INTERPI	90	443,9860	6,3069	17/01/2024	
234	Angical	Angical	Colônia do Piauí	Piauí	INTERPI	90	443,9860	435,0780	17/01/2024	
174	Ariramba	Ariramba	Óbidos	Pará	ITERPA	27	10.454,5619	10.454,5619	18/06/2018	
225	Aturiá	Aturiá	Ourém	Pará	ITERPA	169	428,3112	428,3112	17/11/2023	
187	Barra do Aroeira	Barra do Aroeira	Santa Tereza do Tocantins	Tocantins	ITERTINS	174	62.315,3819	197,6504	29/07/2021	Current title is 1% of claimed area
187	Barra do Aroeira	Barra do Aroeira	Santa Tereza do Tocantins	Tocantins	ITERTINS	174	62.315,3819	714,9511	05/08/2021	Current title is 1% of claimed area
14	Barra do Brumado Rural Community Development Association	Bananal and Barra do Brumado	Rio de Contas	Bahia	CDA / FCP	148	1339.2768	1339.2768	22/12/1999	
25	Bailique	Bailique Beira, Bailique Centro, Poção and São Bernardo	Oeiras do Pará and Baião	Pará	ITERPA	112	7297.69	7297.69	19/07/2002	
134	Baixão Velho	Baixão Velho	Seabra	Bahia	CDA	95	3.817,7706	3.817,7706	27/09/2014	
110	Barreira	Barreira	Bacuri	Maranhão	ITERMA	45	889,0185	889,0185	19/12/2011	
40	Bela Aurora	Bela Aurora	Cachoeira do Piriá	Pará	INCRA	32	2.410,2754	2.410,2754	14/12/2004	
111	Bem Posta	Bem Posta	Presidente Sarney	Maranhão	ITERMA	64	385,1886	385,1886	19/12/2011	
224	Boa Esperança	Boa Esperança	Cametá	Pará	ITERPA	42	503,7489	503,7489	17/11/2023	
1	Boa Vista	Boa Vista	Oriximiná	Pará	INCRA	112	1.125,0341	1.125,0341	20/11/1995	
197	Boa Vista dos Negros	Boa Vista dos Negros	Parelhas	Rio Grande do Norte	INCRA	36	445,2676	65,8341	20/06/2022	Current title is 15% of claimed area
148	Boitaraca	Boitaraca	Nilo Peçanha	Bahia	CDA	110	621,0781	621,0781	12/12/2014	
58	Bom Jesus	Bom Jesus	Candido Mendes	Maranhão	ITERMA	58	216,3937	216,3937	20/11/2006	
125	Boqueirão	Boqueirão	Icatu	Maranhão	ITERMA	40	1.637,3671	1.637,3671	11/11/2013	
210	Brejo dos Crioulos	Brejo dos Crioulos	São João da Ponte, Varzelândia andVerdelândia	Minas Gerais	INCRA	387	17302,6057	482,2855	21/03/2023	Current title is 13% of claimed area
210	Brejo dos Crioulos	Brejo dos Crioulos	São João da Ponte, Varzelândia andVerdelândia	Minas Gerais	INCRA	387	17302,6057	432,4135	21/03/2023	Current title is 13% of claimed area
210	Brejo dos Crioulos	Brejo dos Crioulos	São João da Ponte, Varzelândia andVerdelândia	Minas Gerais	INCRA	387	17302,6057	1.377,9909	21/03/2023	Current title is 13% of claimed area
200	Brejo dos Negros	Brejo dos Negros	Brejo Grande	Sergipe	INCRA	486	8.125,5558	19,7513	31/08/2022	Current title is 0.24% of claimed area
25	Cabeceiras	São José, Silêncio, Mata, Cuecê, Apui e Castanhaduba	Óbidos	Pará	FCP	445	17.189,6939	17.189,6939	08/05/2000	
169	Cachoeira Porteira	Cachoeira Porteira	Oriximiná	Pará	ITERPA	189	225.175,9420	225.175,9420	28/02/2018	
126	Cacoal	Cacoal	Viana	Maranhão	ITERMA	71	114,0457	114,0457	11/11/2013	
245	Cafundó	Cafundó	Salto de Pirapora	São Paulo	INCRA	18	219,4462	44,0980	13/08/2024	Current title is 35% of claimed area
245	Cafundó	Cafundó	Salto de Pirapora	São Paulo	INCRA	18	219,4462	32,2013	13/08/2024	Current title is 35% of claimed area
236	Caiana dos Crioulos	Caiana dos Crioulos	Alagoa Grande, Matinhas, and Massaranduba	Paraíba	INCRA	98	646,5873	290,7645	10/05/2024	Current title is 69% of claimed area
236	Caiana dos Crioulos	Caiana dos Crioulos	Alagoa Grande, Matinhas, and Massaranduba	Paraíba	INCRA	98	646,5873	79,3393	10/05/2024	Current title is 69% of claimed area
236	Caiana dos Crioulos	Caiana dos Crioulos	Alagoa Grande, Matinhas, and Massaranduba	Paraíba	INCRA	98	646,5873	77,2701	10/05/2024	Current title is 69% of claimed area
103	Cajueiro	Cajueiro	Viana	Maranhão	ITERMA	65	271,2850	271,2850	22/08/2011	
22	Camiranga	Camiranga	Cachoeira do Piriá	Pará	ITERPA	39	320,6121	320,6121	16/01/2002	
8	Campinho da Independência	Campinho	Paraty	Rio de Janeiro	SEHAF	59	287,9461	287,9461	19/03/1999	
78	Campo Redondo	Campo Redondo	Bacabal	Maranhão	ITERMA	38	1.521,1087	1.521,1087	14/11/2008	
93	Campo Verde, Igarapé Dona, Ipanema and Santo Antônio (ARQUINEC)	Campo Verde, Igarapé Dona, Ipanema and Santo Antônio (ARQUINEC)	Concórdia do Pará	Pará	INCRA	180	5.981,3412	5.981,3412	25/08/2010	
216	Camutá do Rio Ipixuna	Camutá do Rio Ipixuna	Porto de Moz	Pará	ITERPA	33	4.879,0801	4.879,0801	07/11/2023	
186	Capoeira	Capoeira	Viana	Maranhão	ITERMA	66	261,4269	261,4269	13/07/2021	
63	Caranduba	Caranduba	Acará	Pará	ITERPA	33	644,5477	644,5477	23/11/2006	
105	Carangueijo	Carangueijo	Viana	Maranhão	ITERMA	26	274,3079	274,3079	22/08/2011	
158	Carro Quebrado	Carro Quebrado	Viana	Maranhão	ITERMA	84	176,9941	176,9941	07/10/2016	
94	Casca	Casca	Mostardas	Rio Grande do Sul	INCRA	85	2.387,8596	867,1367	20/10/2010	Currently title is 51% of claimed area
94	Casca	Casca	Mostardas	Rio Grande do Sul	INCRA	85	2.387,8596	333,3071	20/11/2010	Currently title is 51% of claimed area
94	Casca	Casca	Mostardas	Rio Grande do Sul	INCRA	85	2.387,8596	7,2976	20/11/2010	Currently title is 51% of claimed area
94	Casca	Casca	Mostardas	Rio Grande do Sul	INCRA	85	2.387,8596	0,9616	20/11/2010	Currently title is 51% of claimed area
	Castainho	Castainho	Garanhuns	Pernambuco	INCRA	206	189,7738	38,2367	20/10/2015	Current title is 54% of claimed area
	Castainho	Castainho	Garanhuns	Pernambuco	ITERPA	206	189,7738	64,8040	27/02/2020	Current title is 54% of claimed area
	Castanhalzinho	Castanhalzinho	Garrafão do Norte	Pará	ITERPA	62	291,0781	291,0781	20/06/2015	
	Centro Ouro	Centro Ouro, Nossa Senhora das Graças e São Bernardino	Mojú	Pará	ITERPA	123	5.243,1409	5.243,1409	23/11/2006	
	Chácara das Rosas	Chácara das Rosas	Canoas	Rio Grande do Sul	INCRA	20	0,361944	0,361944	21/09/2009	
	Chácara Buriti	Chácara Buriti	Campo Grande	Mato Grosso do Sul	INCRA	19	43,0080	12,1812	27/04/2012	Current title is 28% of claimed area
	Cipó dos Cambaias	Cipó dos Cambaias	São João do Soter	Maranhão	ITERMA	124	2.404,9567	2.404,9567	01/09/2006	
	Colônia de São Miguel	Colônia de São Miguel	Maracajú	Mato Grosso do Sul	INCRA	28	420,6821	333,0736	08/09/2011	Current title is 79% of claimed area
	Conceição	Conceição	Boninal	Bahia	CDA	178	2.693,8879	2.693,8879	27/09/2014	
133	Conceição das Crioulas	Conceição das Crioulas	Salgueiro	Pernambuco	INCRA	750	16.865,0678	227,3733	29/09/2014	Current title is 12% of claimed area
133	Conceição das Crioulas	Conceição das Crioulas	Salgueiro	Pernambuco	INCRA	750	16.865,0678	53,1796	29/09/2014	Current title is 12% of claimed area
133	Conceição das Crioulas	Conceição das Crioulas	Salgueiro	Pernambuco	INCRA	750	16.865,0678	617,9475	29/09/2014	Current title is 12% of claimed area
133	Conceição das Crioulas	Conceição das Crioulas	Salgueiro	Pernambuco	INCRA	750	16.865,0678	22,9082	29/09/2014	Current title is 12% of claimed area
133	Conceição das Crioulas	Conceição das Crioulas	Salgueiro	Pernambuco	INCRA	750	16.865,0678	118,5013	29/09/2014	Current title is 12% of claimed area
133	Conceição das Crioulas	Conceição das Crioulas	Salgueiro	Pernambuco	INCRA	750	16.865,0678	192,3477	29/09/2014	Current title is 12% of claimed area
133	Conceição das Crioulas	Conceição das Crioulas	Salgueiro	Pernambuco	INCRA	750	16.865,0678	410,0000	19/11/2015	Current title is 12% of claimed area
133	Conceição das Crioulas	Conceição das Crioulas	Salgueiro	Pernambuco	INCRA	750	16.865,0678	437,0000	19/11/2015	Current title is 12% of claimed area
	Conceição do Macacoari	Conceição do Macacoari	Macapá	Amapá	INCRA	20	8.475,4710	8.475,4710	02/01/2006	
	Condurus	Condurus	Cururupu	Maranhão	ITERMA	56	1.265,5586	1.265,5586	30/12/2022	
	Contenda	Contenda	Viana	Maranhão	ITERMA	55	1.070,0259	1.070,0259	18/08/2011	
	Cotovelo	Cotovelo	Pinheiro	Maranhão	ITERMA	55	1.220,3410	1.220,3410	14/11/2008	
	Curiau	Curiau	Macapá	Amapá	FCP	108	3.321,8931	3.321,8931	03/12/1999	
	Curral de Pedra	Curral de Pedra	Abaré	Bahia	INCRA	102	4.515,2647	2.374,8485	30/08/2023	Current title is 53% of claimed area
	Cutia	Cutia	Boninal	Bahia	CDA	258	1.160,1228	1.160,1228	20/11/2014	
	Cutia e Cocal	Cutia e Cocal	Presidente Sarney	Maranhão	ITERMA	66	17,6973	17,6973	19/12/2011	
	Cutia II	Cutia II	Matinha	Maranhão	ITERMA	110	99,2236	99,2236	11/11/2013	
	Cutuvelo	Cutuvelo	Garrafão do Norte	Pará	ITERPA	47	497,1703	497,1703	20/06/2015	
	Cuxiu	Cuxiu	Bonito, São Miguel do Guamá and Ourém	Pará	ITERPA	35	353,0204	353,0204	16/11/2021	
	Deus Bem Sabe	Deus Bem Sabe	Serrano do Maranhão	Maranhão	ITERMA	251	1.717,7214	1.717,7214	20/11/2023	
	Eira dos Coqueiros	Eira dos Coqueiros	Codó	Maranhão	ITERMA	35	1.011,8271	1.011,8271	20/08/1999	
	Encantados de Bom Jardim	Encantados de Bom Jardim	Tamboril	Ceará	INCRA	67	1.959,7452	505,5615	20/11/2023	Current title is 26% of claimed area
	Engenho Novo	Engenho Novo	Ourém	Pará	ITERPA	56	385,2366	385,2366	07/11/2023	
	Erepecuru	Pancada, Araçá, Espírito Santo, Jauari, Boa Vista do Cuminá, Varre Vento, Jarauacá and Acapú	Oriximiná and Óbidos	Pará	INCRA	154	231.610,2940	71.150,8867	08/12/1998	
	Erepecuru	Pancada, Araçá, Espírito Santo, Jauari, Boa Vista do Cuminá, Varre Vento, Jarauacá and Acapú	Oriximiná and Óbidos	Pará	ITERPA	154	231.610,2940	160.459,4072	12/05/2000	
	Escondido	Escondido	Acauã	Piauí	INTERPI	10	277,8421	277,8421	20/06/2024	
	Espítiro Santo	Espítiro Santo	Acará	Pará	ITERPA	25	276,1594	276,1594	28/02/2018	
	Família Silva	Família Silva	Porto Alegre	Rio Grande do Sul	INCRA	12	0,6511	0,13207440	21/09/2009	Current title is 35% of claimed area
	Família Silva	Família Silva	Porto Alegre	Rio Grande do Sul	INCRA	12	0,6511	0,05190880	21/09/2009	Current title is 35% of claimed area
	Família Silva	Família Silva	Porto Alegre	Rio Grande do Sul	INCRA	12	0,6511	0,04625550	21/09/2009	Current title is 35% of claimed area
	Fazenda Nova	Fazenda Nova, Carreira da Vaca, Umburana e Santa Inês	Isaías Coelho	Piauí	INTERPI / INCRA	168	5.592,5036	5.592,5036	20/11/2008	
	Ferreira	Ferreira	Viana	Maranhão	ITERMA	50	309,1675	309,1675	22/08/2011	
	Furnas da Boa Sorte	Furnas da Boa Sorte	Corguinho	Mato Grosso do Sul	IDATERRA	52	1.486,4011	73,3177	02/08/2006	Current title is 5% of claimed area
	Galvão	Galvão	Eldorado and Iporanga	São Paulo	ITESP	32	2.177,1701	1.869,5711	18/01/2007	Current title is 86% of claimed area
	Graça	Graça	Matinha	Maranhão	ITERMA	51	356,8969	356,8969	26/06/2012	
	Guajará Miri	Guajará Miri	Acará	Pará	ITERPA	70	1.024,1954	1.024,1954	26/11/2002	
	Guajarauna	Baixo Guajarauna, Cacoal, Divino Espírito Santo, Fazenda e Cinco reis	Abaetetuba and Moju	Pará	ITERPA	46	1.368,3736	1.368,3736	10/05/2022	
	Gurupá	Gurupá Mirin, Jocojó, Flexinha, Carrazedo, Camutá do Ipixuna, Bacá do Ipixuna, Alto Ipixuna e Alto Pucuruí	Gurupá	Pará	ITERPA	300	83.437,1287	83.437,1287	20/07/2000	
	Igarapé do Arirá	Igarapé do Arirá	Oeiras do Pará	Pará	ITERPA	56	1.869,7987	1.869,7987	17/11/2023	
	Igarapé Preto	Araquenbaua, Baixinha, Campelo, Carará, Costeiro, Cupu, França, Igarapé Preto, Igarapezinho, Panpelônia, Teófilo, Varzinha	Baião	Pará	ITERPA	565	17,357	17,357	29/09/2002	
	Ilhas de Abaetetuba	Bom Remédio	Abaetetuba	Pará	ITERPA	116	588,1670	588,1670	05/05/2002	
	Ilhas de Abaetetuba	Alto Itacuruça, Baixo Itacuruça, Jenipaúba, Acaraqui, Igarapé São João, Arapapu, Rio Tauaré-Açu, Arapapuzinho e Rio Ipanema	Abaetetuba	Pará	ITERPA	701	9.076,1909	9.076,1909	05/06/2002	
	Ilha de São Vicente	Ilha de São Vicente	Araguatins	Tocantins	INCRA	48	2.479,2844	2.479,2844	20/11/2023	
	Ilha Grande do Cupijó	Ilha Grande do Cupijó	Cametá	Pará	ITERPA	75	1.922,6471	1.922,6471	28/04/2017	
	Imbiral	Imbiral	Pedro do Rosário	Maranhão	ITERMA	44	44,5899	44,5899	16/11/2016	
	Invernada Paiol de Telha	Invernada Paiol de Telha	Reserva do Iguaçu	Paraná	INCRA	393	2.959,2371	168,3797	04/04/2019	Current title is 39% of claimed area
	Invernada Paiol de Telha	Invernada Paiol de Telha	Reserva do Iguaçu	Paraná	INCRA	393	2.959,2371	57,0899	04/04/2019	Current title is 39% of claimed area
	Invernada Paiol de Telha	Invernada Paiol de Telha	Reserva do Iguaçu	Paraná	INCRA	393	2.959,2371	760,2345	10/11/2022	Current title is 39% of claimed area
	Invernada Paiol de Telha	Invernada Paiol de Telha	Reserva do Iguaçu	Paraná	INCRA	393	2.959,2371	82,2411	10/11/2022	Current title is 39% of claimed area
	Invernada Paiol de Telha	Invernada Paiol de Telha	Reserva do Iguaçu	Paraná	INCRA	393	2.959,2371	81,5492	10/11/2022	Current title is 39% of claimed area
132	Comunidade Remanescente de Quilombo Invernada dos Negros	Invernada dos Negros	Campos Novos and Abdon Batista	Santa Catarina	INCRA	84	7952,9067	12,8457	18/09/2014	Current title is 11% of claimed area
132	Comunidade Remanescente de Quilombo Invernada dos Negros	Invernada dos Negros	Campos Novos and Abdon Batista	Santa Catarina	INCRA	84	7952,9067	4,3367	18/09/2014	Current title is 11% of claimed area
132	Comunidade Remanescente de Quilombo Invernada dos Negros	Invernada dos Negros	Campos Novos and Abdon Batista	Santa Catarina	INCRA	84	7952,9067	47,0713	18/09/2014	Current title is 11% of claimed area
132	Comunidade Remanescente de Quilombo Invernada dos Negros	Invernada dos Negros	Campos Novos and Abdon Batista	Santa Catarina	INCRA	84	7952,9067	201,0626	02/12/2014	Current title is 11% of claimed area
132	Comunidade Remanescente de Quilombo Invernada dos Negros	Invernada dos Negros	Campos Novos and Abdon Batista	Santa Catarina	INCRA	84	7952,9067	7,0680	23/01/2017	Current title is 11% of claimed area
132	Comunidade Remanescente de Quilombo Invernada dos Negros	Invernada dos Negros	Campos Novos and Abdon Batista	Santa Catarina	INCRA	84	7952,9067	27,9071	23/01/2017	Current title is 11% of claimed area
132	Comunidade Remanescente de Quilombo Invernada dos Negros	Invernada dos Negros	Campos Novos and Abdon Batista	Santa Catarina	INCRA	84	7952,9067	10,8509	23/01/2017	Current title is 11% of claimed area
132	Comunidade Remanescente de Quilombo Invernada dos Negros	Invernada dos Negros	Campos Novos and Abdon Batista	Santa Catarina	INCRA	84	7952,9067	59,7083	23/01/2017	Current title is 11% of claimed area
132	Comunidade Remanescente de Quilombo Invernada dos Negros	Invernada dos Negros	Campos Novos and Abdon Batista	Santa Catarina	INCRA	84	7952,9067	4,8525	23/01/2017	Current title is 11% of claimed area
132	Comunidade Remanescente de Quilombo Invernada dos Negros	Invernada dos Negros	Campos Novos and Abdon Batista	Santa Catarina	INCRA	84	7952,9067	5,4718	23/01/2017	Current title is 11% of claimed area
132	Comunidade Remanescente de Quilombo Invernada dos Negros	Invernada dos Negros	Campos Novos and Abdon Batista	Santa Catarina	INCRA	84	7952,9067	4,8995	23/01/2017	Current title is 11% of claimed area
132	Comunidade Remanescente de Quilombo Invernada dos Negros	Invernada dos Negros	Campos Novos and Abdon Batista	Santa Catarina	INCRA	84	7952,9067	3,1363	23/01/2017	Current title is 11% of claimed area
132	Comunidade Remanescente de Quilombo Invernada dos Negros	Invernada dos Negros	Campos Novos and Abdon Batista	Santa Catarina	INCRA	84	7952,9067	106,0960	23/01/2017	Current title is 11% of claimed area
132	Comunidade Remanescente de Quilombo Invernada dos Negros	Invernada dos Negros	Campos Novos and Abdon Batista	Santa Catarina	INCRA	84	7952,9067	4,0035	23/01/2017	Current title is 11% of claimed area
132	Comunidade Remanescente de Quilombo Invernada dos Negros	Invernada dos Negros	Campos Novos and Abdon Batista	Santa Catarina	INCRA	84	7952,9067	10,7475	23/01/2017	Current title is 11% of claimed area
132	Comunidade Remanescente de Quilombo Invernada dos Negros	Invernada dos Negros	Campos Novos and Abdon Batista	Santa Catarina	INCRA	84	7952,9067	63,4158	23/01/2017	Current title is 11% of claimed area
132	Comunidade Remanescente de Quilombo Invernada dos Negros	Invernada dos Negros	Campos Novos and Abdon Batista	Santa Catarina	INCRA	84	7952,9067	4,4305	23/01/2017	Current title is 11% of claimed area
132	Comunidade Remanescente de Quilombo Invernada dos Negros	Invernada dos Negros	Campos Novos and Abdon Batista	Santa Catarina	INCRA	84	7952,9067	27,7798	23/01/2017	Current title is 11% of claimed area
132	Comunidade Remanescente de Quilombo Invernada dos Negros	Invernada dos Negros	Campos Novos and Abdon Batista	Santa Catarina	INCRA	84	7952,9067	33,5097	23/01/2017	Current title is 11% of claimed area
132	Comunidade Remanescente de Quilombo Invernada dos Negros	Invernada dos Negros	Campos Novos and Abdon Batista	Santa Catarina	INCRA	84	7952,9067	11,5940	23/01/2017	Current title is 11% of claimed area
132	Comunidade Remanescente de Quilombo Invernada dos Negros	Invernada dos Negros	Campos Novos and Abdon Batista	Santa Catarina	INCRA	84	7952,9067	23,9368	23/01/2017	Current title is 11% of claimed area
132	Comunidade Remanescente de Quilombo Invernada dos Negros	Invernada dos Negros	Campos Novos and Abdon Batista	Santa Catarina	INCRA	84	7952,9067	2,6569	23/01/2017	Current title is 11% of claimed area
132	Comunidade Remanescente de Quilombo Invernada dos Negros	Invernada dos Negros	Campos Novos and Abdon Batista	Santa Catarina	INCRA	84	7952,9067	6,9929	23/01/2017	Current title is 11% of claimed area
132	Comunidade Remanescente de Quilombo Invernada dos Negros	Invernada dos Negros	Campos Novos and Abdon Batista	Santa Catarina	INCRA	84	7952,9067	11,7720	23/01/2017	Current title is 11% of claimed area
132	Comunidade Remanescente de Quilombo Invernada dos Negros	Invernada dos Negros	Campos Novos and Abdon Batista	Santa Catarina	INCRA	84	7952,9067	13,3786	23/01/2017	Current title is 11% of claimed area
132	Comunidade Remanescente de Quilombo Invernada dos Negros	Invernada dos Negros	Campos Novos and Abdon Batista	Santa Catarina	INCRA	84	7952,9067	8,4205	23/01/2017	Current title is 11% of claimed area
132	Comunidade Remanescente de Quilombo Invernada dos Negros	Invernada dos Negros	Campos Novos and Abdon Batista	Santa Catarina	INCRA	84	7952,9067	8,7076	23/01/2017	Current title is 11% of claimed area
132	Comunidade Remanescente de Quilombo Invernada dos Negros	Invernada dos Negros	Campos Novos and Abdon Batista	Santa Catarina	INCRA	84	7952,9067	22,9104	23/01/2017	Current title is 11% of claimed area
132	Comunidade Remanescente de Quilombo Invernada dos Negros	Invernada dos Negros	Campos Novos and Abdon Batista	Santa Catarina	INCRA	84	7952,9067	5,0087	23/01/2017	Current title is 11% of claimed area
132	Comunidade Remanescente de Quilombo Invernada dos Negros	Invernada dos Negros	Campos Novos and Abdon Batista	Santa Catarina	INCRA	84	7952,9067	2,3313	24/11/2017	Current title is 11% of claimed area
132	Comunidade Remanescente de Quilombo Invernada dos Negros	Invernada dos Negros	Campos Novos and Abdon Batista	Santa Catarina	INCRA	84	7952,9067	22,1587	24/11/2017	Current title is 11% of claimed area
132	Comunidade Remanescente de Quilombo Invernada dos Negros	Invernada dos Negros	Campos Novos and Abdon Batista	Santa Catarina	INCRA	84	7952,9067	25,9370	06/07/2018	Current title is 11% of claimed area
132	Comunidade Remanescente de Quilombo Invernada dos Negros	Invernada dos Negros	Campos Novos and Abdon Batista	Santa Catarina	INCRA	84	7952,9067	48,7237	06/07/2018	Current title is 11% of claimed area
132	Comunidade Remanescente de Quilombo Invernada dos Negros	Invernada dos Negros	Campos Novos and Abdon Batista	Santa Catarina	INCRA	84	7952,9067	9,7221	07/05/2019	Current title is 11% of claimed area
132	Comunidade Remanescente de Quilombo Invernada dos Negros	Invernada dos Negros	Campos Novos and Abdon Batista	Santa Catarina	INCRA	84	7952,9067	11,1343	23/12/2019	Current title is 11% of claimed area
132	Comunidade Remanescente de Quilombo Invernada dos Negros	Invernada dos Negros	Campos Novos and Abdon Batista	Santa Catarina	INCRA	84	7952,9067	28,8875	23/12/2019	Current title is 11% of claimed area
	Ipiranga	Ipiranga	Viana	Maranhão	ITERMA	56	1.124,5847	1.124,5847	07/10/2016	
	Itaboca-Quatro Bocas and Cacoal	Itaboca-Quatro Bocas and Cacoal	Inhangapi	Pará	ITERPA	84	446,6848	446,6848	17/12/2010	
	Itamoari	Itamoari	Cachoeira do Piriá	Pará	INCRA	33	5.377,6028	5.377,6028	07/09/1998	
	Itacoã Miri	Itacoã Miri	Acará	Pará	ITERPA	96	968,9932	968,9932	20/11/2003	
	Itaperinha	Itaperinha	Tutoia	Maranhão	ITERMA	61	715,1046	715,1046	30/10/2014	
	Ivaporunduva	Ivaporunduva	Eldorado	São Paulo	ITESP	102	2.707,4044	672,2844	20/03/2003	
	Ivaporunduva	Ivaporunduva	Eldorado	São Paulo	INCRA	102	2.707,4044	2.035,1200	20/05/2010	
	Jabaquara	Jabaquara	Acará	Pará	ITERPA	32	56,1960	56,1960	08/11/2023	
	Jacarequara	Jacarequara	Santa Luzia do Pará	Pará	ITERPA	55	1.236,9910	1.236,9910	13/05/2008	
	Jacuíca	Jacuíca	Matinha	Maranhão	ITERMA	45	317,3447	317,3447	26/06/2012	
	Jacunday	Jacunday	Mojú	Pará	ITERPA	60	1.701,5887	1.701,5887	23/11/2006	
	Jamari dos Pretos	Jamari dos Pretos	Turiaçu	Maranhão	ITERMA	162	6.613,0630	6.613,0630	07/04/2011	
	Jatobá	Jatobá	Muquém de São Francisco	Bahia	SPU	69	12.717,2620	1.778,8900	21/05/2007	Current title is 86% of claimed area
131	Jatobá	Jatobá	Patu	Rio Grande do Norte	INCRA	45	219,1934	20,1253	12/09/2014	Current title is 98% of claimed area
131	Jatobá	Jatobá	Patu	Rio Grande do Norte	INCRA	45	219,1934	20,2540	12/09/2014	Current title is 98% of claimed area
131	Jatobá	Jatobá	Patu	Rio Grande do Norte	INCRA	45	219,1934	45,3644	12/09/2014	Current title is 98% of claimed area
131	Jatobá	Jatobá	Patu	Rio Grande do Norte	INCRA	45	219,1934	20,3814	12/09/2014	Current title is 98% of claimed area
131	Jatobá	Jatobá	Patu	Rio Grande do Norte	INCRA	45	219,1934	6,4838	12/09/2014	Current title is 98% of claimed area
131	Jatobá	Jatobá	Patu	Rio Grande do Norte	INCRA	45	219,1934	3,9230	12/09/2014	Current title is 98% of claimed area
131	Jatobá	Jatobá	Patu	Rio Grande do Norte	INCRA	45	219,1934	14,2988	12/09/2014	Current title is 98% of claimed area
131	Jatobá	Jatobá	Patu	Rio Grande do Norte	INCRA	45	219,1934	85,0000	10/11/2015	Current title is 98% of claimed area
	Jenipapo	Jenipapo	Caxias	Maranhão	ITERMA	74	558,5242	558,5242	01/11/2002	
	Jesus	Jesus	São Miguel do Guaporé	Rondônia	INCRA	12	5.567,6207	870,8916	19/12/2022	
	Jesus	Jesus	São Miguel do Guaporé	Rondônia	INCRA	12	5.567,6207	4.696,7291	19/12/2022	
	Juquiri	Juquiri	Moju	Pará	ITERPA	65	698,2962	698,2962	29/06/2022	
	Jurussaca	Jurussaca	Traquateua	Pará	ITERPA	45	200,9875	200,9875	14/09/2002	
	Juçaral/Santa Helena	Juçaral/Santa Helena	Itapecuru-Mirim	Maranhão	ITERMA	30	345,4331	345,4331	20/11/2006	Current title is 57% of claimed area
	Juçaral / São Francisco Malaquias	São Francisco Malaquias	Vargem Grande	Maranhão	INCRA	28	1.089,0918	625,5662	02/12/2014	
155	Kalunga	Areia, Barra, Barrinha, Boa Esperança, Boa Sorte, Bom Jardim, Bonito, Buriti, Buriti Velho, Buritizinho, Calda, Capela, Capim Puro, Capivara, Carolina, Côco, Congonha, Contenda, Córrego da Ser, Córrego Fundo I e II, Curriola, Diadema, Ema, Engenho II, Faina, Fazendinha, Gameleira, Gonçalo Vão das Almas, Jurema, Lagoa, Limoeiro, Maiadinha, Paiol da Roda, Parida, Pé de Morro, Pedra Preta, Prata, Redenção, Riachão, Ribeirão, Salinas, São Pedro, Sucuri, Suçuarana, Taboca, Terra Vermelha, Tinguizal, Ursa, Vão das Almas, Vargem Grande, Vasantão, Volta do Canto	Monte Alegre, Teresina de Goiás and Cavalcante	Goiás	INCRA	888	261.999,6987	1.405,2500	20/11/2015	Current title is 10% of claimed area
155	Kalunga		Monte Alegre, Teresina de Goiás and Cavalcante	Goiás	INCRA	888	261.999,6987	4.624,0800	20/11/2015	Current title is 10% of claimed area
155	Kalunga		Monte Alegre, Teresina de Goiás and Cavalcante	Goiás	INCRA	888	261.999,6987	220,7100	24/05/2018	Current title is 10% of claimed area
155	Kalunga		Monte Alegre, Teresina de Goiás and Cavalcante	Goiás	INCRA	888	261.999,6987	1.162,1373	24/05/2018	Current title is 10% of claimed area
155	Kalunga		Monte Alegre, Teresina de Goiás and Cavalcante	Goiás	INCRA	888	261.999,6987	2.721,3922	24/05/2018	Current title is 10% of claimed area
155	Kalunga		Monte Alegre, Teresina de Goiás and Cavalcante	Goiás	INCRA	888	261.999,6987	12.356,2775	24/05/2018	Current title is 10% of claimed area
155	Kalunga		Monte Alegre, Teresina de Goiás and Cavalcante	Goiás	INCRA	888	261.999,6987	3.425,2492	31/08/2022	Current title is 10% of claimed area
	Lago Grande	Lago Grande	Peritoró	Maranhão	ITERMA	44	906,8315	906,8315	20/11/2006	
	Lagoa das Pedras e Encantados de Bom Jardim	Lagoa das Pedras e Encantados de Bom Jardim	Tamboril	Ceará	INCRA	67	1.959,7452	505,5615	20/11/2023	Current title is 34% of claimed area
	Lagoa das Pedras e Encantados de Bom Jardim	Lagoa das Pedras e Encantados de Bom Jardim	Tamboril	Ceará	INCRA	67	1.959,7452	157,0401	12/04/2024	Current title is 34% of claimed area
118	Lagoa dos Campinhos	Lagoa dos Campinhos	Amparo de São Francisco and Telha	Sergipe	INCRA	89	1.263,9493	114,6210	21/11/2012	Current title is 43% of claimed area
118	Lagoa dos Campinhos	Lagoa dos Campinhos	Amparo de São Francisco and Telha	Sergipe	INCRA	89	1.263,9493	47,6673	05/12/2013	Current title is 43% of claimed area
118	Lagoa dos Campinhos	Lagoa dos Campinhos	Amparo de São Francisco and Telha	Sergipe	INCRA	89	1.263,9493	94,3837	05/12/2013	Current title is 43% of claimed area
118	Lagoa dos Campinhos	Lagoa dos Campinhos	Amparo de São Francisco and Telha	Sergipe	INCRA	89	1.263,9493	17,0511	20/11/2015	Current title is 43% of claimed area
118	Lagoa dos Campinhos	Lagoa dos Campinhos	Amparo de São Francisco and Telha	Sergipe	INCRA	89	1.263,9493	2,8829	20/11/2015	Current title is 43% of claimed area
118	Lagoa dos Campinhos	Lagoa dos Campinhos	Amparo de São Francisco and Telha	Sergipe	INCRA	89	1.263,9493	2,6692	20/11/2015	Current title is 43% of claimed area
118	Lagoa dos Campinhos	Lagoa dos Campinhos	Amparo de São Francisco and Telha	Sergipe	INCRA	89	1.263,9493	119, 2000	08/08/2017	Current title is 43% of claimed area
118	Lagoa dos Campinhos	Lagoa dos Campinhos	Amparo de São Francisco and Telha	Sergipe	INCRA	89	1.263,9493	6,9159	31/08/2022	Current title is 43% of claimed area
118	Lagoa dos Campinhos	Lagoa dos Campinhos	Amparo de São Francisco and Telha	Sergipe	INCRA	89	1.263,9493	11,2949	31/08/2022	Current title is 43% of claimed area
118	Lagoa dos Campinhos	Lagoa dos Campinhos	Amparo de São Francisco and Telha	Sergipe	INCRA	89	1.263,9493	10,9224	31/08/2022	Current title is 43% of claimed area
118	Lagoa dos Campinhos	Lagoa dos Campinhos	Amparo de São Francisco and Telha	Sergipe	INCRA	89	1.263,9493	111,3294	21/03/2023	Current title is 43% of claimed area
118	Lagoa dos Campinhos	Lagoa dos Campinhos	Amparo de São Francisco and Telha	Sergipe	INCRA	89	1.263,9493	6,2992	20/11/2023	Current title is 43% of claimed area
	Lagoa Verde	Lagoa Verde	América Dourada	Bahia	CDA	75	1.275,2692	1.275,2692	27/09/2014	
	Laranjituba/Africa	Laranjituba/Africa	Mojú	Pará	ITERPA	48	1.226,2278	118,0441	04/12/2001	
	Laranjituba/Africa	Laranjituba/Africa	Mojú	Pará	ITERPA	48	1.226,2278	1.108,1837	02/12/2008	
	Macacos	Macacos	São Miguel do Tapuio	Piauí	INTERPI	65	2.780,3576	2.780,3576	23/05/2024	
	Macapazinho	Macapazinho	Santa Isabel do Pará	Pará	ITERPA	33	91,1505	91,1505	13/05/2008	
	Malhada de Pretos	Malhada de Pretos	Peri Mirim	Maranhão	ITERMA	53	346,8973	346,8973	20/11/2023	
	Mangal e Barro Vermelho	Mangal e Barro Vermelho	Sítio do Mato	Bahia	INTERBA / FCP	295	9.195,5182	153,8043	30/01/1999	Current title is 2% of claimed area
	Marambaia	Marambaia	Mangaratiba	Rio de Janeiro	INCRA	124	52,9939	42,2014	08/10/2015	
	Marambaia	Marambaia	Mangaratiba	Rio de Janeiro	INCRA	124	52,9939	6,6380	08/10/2015	
	Marambaia	Marambaia	Mangaratiba	Rio de Janeiro	INCRA	124	52,9939	2,8945	08/10/2015	
	Marambaia	Marambaia	Mangaratiba	Rio de Janeiro	INCRA	124	52,9939	1,0607	08/10/2015	
	Marambaia	Marambaia	Mangaratiba	Rio de Janeiro	INCRA	124	52,9939	0,1320	08/10/2015	
	Marambaia	Marambaia	Mangaratiba	Rio de Janeiro	INCRA	124	52,9939	0,0673	08/10/2015	
	Maria Ribeira	Maria Ribeira	Gurupá	Pará	Iterpa	32	2.031,8727	2.031,8727	20/11/2000	
	Maria Rosa	Maria Rosa	Iporanga	São Paulo	ITESP	20	3.375,6582	3.375,6582	15/01/2001	
	Marinheiro	Marinheiro	Piripiri	Piauí	INTERPI	85	208,1455	208,1455	03/09/2021	
	Marques	Marques	Carlos Chagas and Teófilo Otoni	Minas Gerais	INCRA	6	250,7647	10,6622	11/11/2022	Current title is 60% of claimed area
	Marques	Marques	Carlos Chagas and Teófilo Otoni	Minas Gerais	INCRA	6	250,7647	35,5700	11/11/2022	Current title is 60% of claimed area
	Marques	Marques	Carlos Chagas and Teófilo Otoni	Minas Gerais	INCRA	6	250,7647	56,5051	11/11/2022	Current title is 60% of claimed area
	Marques	Marques	Carlos Chagas and Teófilo Otoni	Minas Gerais	INCRA	6	250,7647	48,7216	11/11/2022	Current title is 60% of claimed area
	Mata de São Benedito	Mata de São Benedito	Itapecuru Mirim	Maranhão	INCRA	35	1.114,3978	54,7880	02/12/2014	Current title is 5% of claimed area
	Matias	Matias	Cametá	Pará	ITERPA	45	1.424,6701	1.424,6701	13/05/2008	
	Mel da Pedreira	Mel da Pedreira	Macapá	Amapá	INCRA	25	2.629,0532	2.629,0532	21/03/2007	
	Menino Jesus	Menino Jesus	São Miguel do Guamá	Pará	ITERPA	12	288,9449	288,9449	13/05/2008	
	Mimbó	Mimbó	Amarante	Piauí	INTERPI	72	2.873,5074	2.873,5074	20/06/2023	
	Mirinzal da Julita	Mirinzal da Julita	Presidente Juscelino	Maranhão	ITERMA	25	330,1586	330,1586	07/11/2016	
	Mocambo	Mocambo	Ourém	Pará	ITERPA	102	657,6820	657,6820	13/11/2012	
117	Mocambo	Mocambo	Porto da Folha	Sergipe	INCRA	113	2,100.5400	125,7602	21/11/2012	Current title is 34% of claimed area
117	Mocambo	Mocambo	Porto da Folha	Sergipe	INCRA	113	2,100.5400	46,5438	21/11/2012	Current title is 34% of claimed area
117	Mocambo	Mocambo	Porto da Folha	Sergipe	INCRA	113	2,100.5400	126,9944	21/11/2012	Current title is 34% of claimed area
117	Mocambo	Mocambo	Porto da Folha	Sergipe	INCRA	113	2,100.5400	11,0326	21/11/2012	Current title is 34% of claimed area
117	Mocambo	Mocambo	Porto da Folha	Sergipe	INCRA	113	2,100.5400	139,0755	21/11/2012	Current title is 34% of claimed area
117	Mocambo	Mocambo	Porto da Folha	Sergipe	INCRA	113	2,100.5400	58,8255	21/11/2012	Current title is 34% of claimed area
117	Mocambo	Mocambo	Porto da Folha	Sergipe	INCRA	113	2,100.5400	30,7862	21/11/2012	Current title is 34% of claimed area
117	Mocambo	Mocambo	Porto da Folha	Sergipe	INCRA	113	2,100.5400	15,6790	21/11/2012	Current title is 34% of claimed area
117	Mocambo	Mocambo	Porto da Folha	Sergipe	INCRA	113	2,100.5400	53,4142	21/11/2012	Current title is 34% of claimed area
117	Mocambo	Mocambo	Porto da Folha	Sergipe	INCRA	113	2,100.5400	31,3296	21/11/2012	Current title is 34% of claimed area
117	Mocambo	Mocambo	Porto da Folha	Sergipe	INCRA	113	2,100.5400	32,3098	21/11/2012	Current title is 34% of claimed area
117	Mocambo	Mocambo	Porto da Folha	Sergipe	INCRA	113	2,100.5400	32,3719	21/11/2012	Current title is 34% of claimed area
	Mocambo e Cachoeira	Cachoeira da Várzea e Mocambo da Cachoeira	Seabra	Bahia	CDA	200	3.376,0633	3.376,0633	20/11/2014	
	Mocorongo	Mocorongo	Codó	Maranhão	ITERMA	24	162,6254	162,6254	20/08/1999	
	Moju-Miri	Moju-Miri	Moju	Pará	ITERPA	28	878,6388	878,6388	02/12/2008	
	Morrinhos	Morrinho, Sapé, Cipoal, Barreiras e Cabeça da Vaca	Isaías Coelho	Piauí	INTERPI / INCRA	168	2.532,8489	2.532,8489	20/11/2008	
	Montevidéu	Montevidéu	Ourém	Pará	ITERPA	29	49,4126	49,4126	08/11/2023	
	Mucambo	Mucambo	Viana	Maranhão	ITERMA	110	397,0043	397,0043	22/08/2011	
	Mulungu	Mulungu	Boninal	Bahia	CDA	258	2.378,5163	2.378,5163	19/11/2014	
	Muruteuazinho	Muruteuazinho	Santa Luzia do Pará	Pará	ITERPA	38	628,4249	628,4249	04/09/2013	
	Narcisa	Narcisa	Capitão Poço	Pará	INCRA	7	618,9320	120,0530	14/11/2002	Current title is 19% of claimed area
	Nossa Senhora da Conceição	Nossa Senhora da Conceição	Moju	Pará	ITERPA	54	2.393,0559	2.393,0559	20/11/2005	
	Nossa Senhora do Livramento	Nossa Senhora do Livramento	Igarapé-Açu and Nova Timboteua	Pará	ITERPA	53	128,9332	128,9332	06/05/2010	
	Nossa Senhora de Fátima de Crauateua	Nossa Senhora de Fátima de Crauateua	São Miguel do Guamá	Pará	ITERPA	61	495,4909	495,4909	19/11/2020	
	Olho D'água do Raposo	Olho D'água do Raposo	Caxias	Maranhão	ITERMA	72	187,3333	187,3333	27/12/2005	
	Olho D'Água dos Pires	Olho D'Água dos Pires	Esperantina	Piauí	INTERPI / INCRA	89	626,8390	626,8390	20/11/2006	
	Paca e Aningal	Paca e Aningal	Viseu	Pará	INCRA	22	1.284,2398	1.284,2398	14/12/2004	
3	Pacoval de Alenquer	Pacoval	Alenquer	Pará	INCRA	115	7.472,8790	7.472,8790	20/11/1996	
	Paraíso	Paraíso	Inhangapi	Pará	ITERPA	22	135,4017	135,4017	08/11/2023	
	Parateca and Pau D'Arco	Parateca and Pau D'Arco	Malhada	Bahia	SPU	500	41.780,0000	7.801,4484	08/08/2006	Current title is 19% of claimed area
	PEAFU	PEAFU	Monte Alegre, Pará	Pará	ITERPA	49	1.525,9261	1.525,9261	06/11/2023	
	Pedrinhas	Pedrinhas	Anajatuba	Maranhão	ITERMA	28	128,6363	128,6363	14/11/2008	
	Pedro Cubas	Pedro Cubas	Eldorado	São Paulo	ITESP	40	3.795,6701	2.443,7210	20/03/2003	Current title is 64% of claimed area
	Pérolá do Maicá	Pérolá do Maicá	Santarém	Pará	PM Santarém	16	3,1522	1,3894	20/09/2018	Current title is 73% of claimed area
	Pérolá do Maicá	Pérolá do Maicá	Santarém	Pará	PM Santarém	16	3,1522	0,3250	20/09/2018	Current title is 73% of claimed area
	Pérolá do Maicá	Pérolá do Maicá	Santarém	Pará	PM Santarém	16	3,1522	0,4501	20/09/2018	Current title is 73% of claimed area
	Pérolá do Maicá	Pérolá do Maicá	Santarém	Pará	PM Santarém	16	3,1522	0,0296	16/10/2019	Current title is 73% of claimed area
	Pérolá do Maicá	Pérolá do Maicá	Santarém	Pará	PM Santarém	16	3,1522	0,0634	16/10/2019	Current title is 73% of claimed area
	Pérolá do Maicá	Pérolá do Maicá	Santarém	Pará	PM Santarém	16	3,1522	0,0356	16/10/2019	Current title is 73% of claimed area
	Peruana	Peruana	Óbidos	Pará	INCRA	16	1.945,5300	1.945,5300	26/10/2018	
	Petimandeua	Petimandeua	Inhangapi	Pará	ITERPA	55	302,073	302,073	09/01/2023	
	Pirangi	Pirangi	Capela	Sergipe	SPU	43	128,1984	71,3694	05/12/2013	Current title is 56% of claimed area
	Pitombeira	Pitombeira	Queimada Nova	Piauí	INTERPI	95	1.266,1976	1.266,1976	23/05/2024	
	Pontal da Barra	Pontal da Barra	Barra dos Coqueiros	Sergipe	INCRA	153	325,6935	117,6160	09/08/2017	Current title is 36% of claimed area
	Porto Alegre	Porto Alegre	Cametá	Pará	ITERPA	54	2.858,7114	2.858,7114	20/11/2007	
	Porto Corís	Porto Corís	Leme do Prado	Minas Gerais	CEMIG	21	1.121,4200	1.121,4200	24/05/2013	
	Porto dos Pilões	Porto dos Pilões	Iporanga	São Paulo	ITESP	51	5.908,6824	5.908,6824	15/01/2001	
	Preto Forro	Preto Forro	Cabo Frio	Rio de Janeiro	ITERJ	12	90,5403	90,5403	04/11/2011	
	Promissão	Promissão	São Luis Gonzaga do Maranhão	Maranhão	ITERMA	85	179,5163	179,5163	09/08/2006	
	Quatro Bocas	Quatro Bocas	Presidente Sarney	Maranhão	ITERMA	40	398,4774	398,4774	09/11/2022	
	Queimadas Grande	Queimadas Grande	Isaias Coelho	Piauí	INTERPI	70	3.257,6764	3.257,6764	13/11/2020	
	Queluz	Queluz	Anajatuba	Maranhão	ITERMA	125	243,4938	243,4938	25/09/2017	
	Ramal do Bacuri	Ramal do Bacuri	Abaetetuba	Pará	ITERPA	135	911,8576	911,8576	27/06/2022	
	Ramal do Piratuba	Ramal do Piratuba	Abaetetuba	Pará	ITERPA	176	959,8167	959,8167	17/12/2010	
	Riacho Fundo	Riacho Fundo	Isaias Coelho	Piauí	INTERPI	200	1.842,7621	1.842,7621	03/09/2021	
	Ribeira do Jambu-Açu	Ribeira do Jambu-Açu	Moju	Pará	ITERPA	62	1.303,5089	1.303,5089	02/12/2008	
	Rincão dos Martinianos	Rincão dos Martinianos	Restinga Seca	Rio Grande do Sul	INCRA	55	98,6341	1,4354	11/06/2014	Current title is 27% of claimed area
	Rincão dos Martinianos	Rincão dos Martinianos	Restinga Seca	Rio Grande do Sul	INCRA	55	98,6341	2,4550	11/06/2014	Current title is 27% of claimed area
	Rincão dos Martinianos	Rincão dos Martinianos	Restinga Seca	Rio Grande do Sul	INCRA	55	98,6341	7,2082	11/06/2014	Current title is 27% of claimed area
	Rincão dos Martinianos	Rincão dos Martinianos	Restinga Seca	Rio Grande do Sul	INCRA	55	98,6341	15,0617	11/06/2014	Current title is 27% of claimed area
	Rio Capim	Quiandeua	Ipixuna do Pará	Pará	ITERPA	85	8.118,7137	8.118,7137	14/06/2023	
	Rio dos Macacos	Rio dos Macacos	Simões Filho and Salvador	Bahia	INCRA	67	104,8787	91,2855	25/05/2020	Current title is 93% of claimed area
	Rio dos Macacos	Rio dos Macacos	Simões Filho and Salvador	Bahia	INCRA	67	104,8787	6,5536	25/05/2020	Current title is 93% of claimed area
	Rio dos Peixes	Rio dos Peixes	Pinheiro	Maranhão	ITERMA	47	54,2234	54,2234	01/09/2006	
	Rio Grande	Rio Grande	Bequimão	Maranhão	ITERMA	108	1.032,1306	1.032,1306	09/11/2022	
	Rosa	Rosa	Macapá	Amapá	INCRA	17	4984,4857	376,0991	21/06/2024	Current title is 84% of claimed area
	Rosa	Rosa	Macapá	Amapá	INCRA	17	4984,4857	2.190,5828	21/06/2024	Current title is 84% of claimed area
	Rosa	Rosa	Macapá	Amapá	INCRA	17	4984,4857	1.532,8892	21/06/2024	Current title is 84% of claimed area
	Rosa	Rosa	Macapá	Amapá	INCRA	17	4984,4857	18,7541	21/06/2024	Current title is 84% of claimed area
	Rosa	Rosa	Macapá	Amapá	INCRA	17	4984,4857	85,5928	21/06/2024	Current title is 84% of claimed area
	Sabonete	Sabonete	Isaias Coelho and Campinas do Piauí	Piauí	INTERPI	47	1.962,2480	1.962,2480	23/03/2022	
	Samaúma	Samaúma	Abaetetuba	Pará	ITERPA	12	213,0550	213,0550	02/12/2008	
	Santa Cruz	Santa Cruz	Peri Mirim	Maranhão	ITERMA	55	258,1854	258,1854	20/11/2023	
	Santa Fé	Santa Fé	Costa Marques	Rondônia	INCRA	41	1.452,9224	1.452,9224	15/08/2017	
	Santa Fe e Santo Antônio	Santa Fe e Santo Antônio	Baião	Pará	ITERPA	28	830,8776	830,8776	29/09/2002	
	Santa Izabel	Santa Izabel	Candido Mendes	Maranhão	ITERMA	60	837,6155	837,6155	30/08/2006	
	Santa Luzia do Bom Prazer	Santa Luzia do Bom Prazer	Moju	Pará	ITERPA	66	1.024,1135	1.024,1135	09/11/2023	
	Santa Luzia do Traquateua	Santa Luzia do Traquateua	Moju	Pará	ITERPA	32	342,3018	342,3018	30/11/2009	
	Santa Maria do Mirindeua	Santa Maria do Mirindeua	Moju	Pará	ITERPA	85	1.763,0618	1.763,0618	23/08/2003	
	Santa Maria do Muraiteua	Santa Maria do Muraiteua	São Miguel do Guamá	Pará	ITERPA	60	398,8357	398,8357	10/05/2022	
	Santa Maria dos Pretos	Santa Maria dos Pretos	Itapecuru Mirim	Maranhão	INCRA	352	5.584,1620	401,3321	02/12/2014	Current title is 11% of claimed area
	Santa Maria dos Pretos	Santa Maria dos Pretos	Itapecuru Mirim	Maranhão	INCRA	352	5.584,1620	206,1931	02/12/2014	Current title is 11% of claimed area
	Santa Quitéria e Itacoãozinho	Santa Quitéria e Itacoãozinho	Acará	Pará	ITERPA	67	646,5774	646,5774	17/12/2010	
	Santa Rita de Barreira	Santa Rita de Barreira	São Miguel do Guamá	Pará	ITERPA	35	371,3032	371,3032	22/09/2002	
	Santa Rita do Vale	Santa Rita do Vale	Santa Rita	Maranhão	ITERMA	120	319,4535	319,4535	14/10/2009	
	Santana	Santana	Santa Rita	Maranhão	ITERMA	41	201,1171	201,1171	01/09/2006	
	Santa Ana de Baixo	Santa Ana de Baixo	Moju	Pará	ITERPA	34	1.551,1216	1.551,1216	30/11/2009	
	Santa Tereza	Santa Tereza	Mirinzal	Maranhão	ITERMA	37	262,7899	262,7899	15/12/2016	
	Santo Antônio	Santo Antônio	Serrabo	Maranhão	ITERMA	180	277,3625	277,3625	18/11/2020	
	Santo Antonio dos Pretos	Santo Antonio dos Pretos	Codó	Maranhão	ITERMA	102	2.139,5500	2.139,5500	20/08/1999	
	Santo Cristo	Santo Cristo	Moju	Pará	ITERPA	52	1.767,0434	1.767,0434	23/08/2003	
	Santo Inácio	Santo Inácio	Pinheiro	Maranhão	ITERMA	79	1.363,4178	1.363,4178	01/09/2006	
	Sâo Benedito	Sâo Benedito	Serrano do Maranhão	Maranhão	ITERMA	133	1.276,8493	1.276,8493	15/02/2022	
	São Benedito dos Carneiros	São Benedito dos Carneiros	Olinda Nova do Maranhão	Maranhão	ITERMA	45	219,2630	219,2630	11/11/2013	
	São José de Bruno	São José de Bruno	Matinha	Maranhão	ITERMA	38	386,8881	386,8881	11/11/2013	
	São José de Icatu	Icatu	Mocajuba	Pará	ITERPA	80	1,636.6122	1,636.6122	30/11/2002	
	São José dos Portugueses	São José dos Portugueses	Cândido Mendes	Maranhão	ITERMA	279	2.119,7745	2.119,7745	19/05/2017	
	São Judas Tadeu (ARQUIOB)	São Judas Tadeu (ARQUIOB)	Bujaru	Pará	INCRA	86	2.003,6961	2.003,6961	29/10/2018	
	São Manoel	São Manoel	Viana	Maranhão	ITERMA	22	223,3642	223,3642	22/08/2011	
	São Manuel	São Manuel	Moju	Pará	ITERPA	68	1.163,6383	1.163,6383	20/11/2005	
	São Martins	São Martins	Paulistana	Piauí	INTERPI	108	2.042,4504	2.042,4504	20/06/2024	
	São Pedro	São Pedro	Eldorado andIporanga	São Paulo	ITESP	39	4.686,9803	4.558,1986	15/01/2001	Current title is 97% of claimed area
	São Pedro	São Pedro	Castanhal	Pará	ITERPA	52	13.454,9600	13.454,9600	16/11/2023	
	São Raimundo da Pirativa	São Raimundo da Pirativa	Santana	Amapá	SPU	13	23,4184	23,4184	13/11/2013	
	Santa Rosa	Santa Rosa	Viana	Maranhão	ITERMA	32	605,6808	605,6808	22/08/2011	
	Santa Rosa e Adjacencias	Santa Rosa e Adjacencias	Viana	Maranhão	ITERMA	40	343,5436	343,5436	22/08/2011	
	São Sebastião	São Sebastião	Moju	Pará	ITERPA	39	962,0094	962,0094	30/11/2009	
	São Sebastião dos Pretos	São Sebastião dos Pretos	Bacabal	Maranhão	ITERMA	62	1.010,2186	1.010,2186	27/12/2005	
	São Tome Tauçú	São Tome Tauçú	Portel	Pará	ITERPA	40	2.568,6224	2.568,6224	12/03/2018	
156	Serra da Guia	Serra da Guia	Poço Redondo	Sergipe	INCRA	197	9.013,1831	340,0800	20/11/2015	Current title is 22% of claimed area
156	Serra da Guia	Serra da Guia	Poço Redondo	Sergipe	INCRA	197	9.013,1831	74,5479	31/08/2022	Current title is 22% of claimed area
156	Serra da Guia	Serra da Guia	Poço Redondo	Sergipe	INCRA	197	9.013,1831	308,5253	21/03/2023	Current title is 22% of claimed area
156	Serra da Guia	Serra da Guia	Poço Redondo	Sergipe	INCRA	197	9.013,1831	551,9106	21/03/2023	Current title is 22% of claimed area
156	Serra da Guia	Serra da Guia	Poço Redondo	Sergipe	INCRA	197	9.013,1831	282,9643	18/03/2024	Current title is 22% of claimed area
156	Serra da Guia	Serra da Guia	Poço Redondo	Sergipe	INCRA	197	9.013,1831	74,5479	26/03/2024	Current title is 22% of claimed area
156	Serra da Guia	Serra da Guia	Poço Redondo	Sergipe	INCRA	197	9.013,1831	349,7210	02/04/2024	Current title is 22% of claimed area
	Serra do Queimadão	Serra do Queimadão	Seabra	Bahia	CDA	150	1504,4741	1504,4741	19/11/2014	
	Sítio Arruda	Sítio Arruda	Araripe and Salitre	Ceará	INCRA	34	334,3401	189,7153	20/11/2023	Current title is 67% of claimed area
	Sítio Arruda	Sítio Arruda	Araripe and Salitre	Ceará	INCRA	34	334,3401	33,9259	26/03/2024	Current title is 67% of claimed area
	Sítio Bosque	Sítio Bosque	Moju	Pará	ITERPA	85	1.152,7029	1.152,7029	20/07/2015	
	Sitio Novo	Sitio Novo	Jussara	Bahia	CDA	94	978,6809	978,6809	15/12/2014	
	Sítio Velho	Sítio Velho	Assunção do Piauí	Piauí	INTERPI / INCRA	92	847,8211	847,8211	20/11/2006	
	Soledade	Soledade	Serrano do Maranhã	Maranhão	ITERMA	68	707,2251	707,2251	19/11/2019	
	Sumidouro	Sumidouro	Queimada Nova	Piauí	INTERPI	56	927,3859	882,2118	29/11/2023	
	Sumidouro	Sumidouro	Queimada Nova	Piauí	INTERPI	56	927,3859	6,9597	18/01/2024	
	Sumidouro	Sumidouro	Queimada Nova	Piauí	INTERPI	56	927,3859	38,2144	18/01/2024	
	Sussuarana	Sussuarana	Piripiri	Piauí	INTERPI	170	1.164,7046	373,8060	20/06/2024	Current title is 32% of claimed area
	Tabacaria	Tabacaria	Palmeira dos Índios	Alagoas	INCRA	89	410,0181	400,0181	20/11/2016	Current title is 98% of claimed area
	Tambaí-Açu	Tambaí-Açu	Mocajuba and Baião	Pará	ITERPA	66	1.824,7852	1.824,7852	30/11/2009	
	Tapuia	Tapuia	Camamu	Bahia	CDA	193	2.425,8297	2.425,8297	31/01/2018	
	Tatituquara	Tatituquara, São Sebastião, Arará, Boa Esprança	Bagre	Pará	ITERPA	41	7.662,7691	7.662,7691	21/09/2020	
	Terra da Liberdade	Tomázia, Tachizal, Itapocu, Mola, Bonfim, Frade, Laguinho and Itabatinga Médio	Cametá and Mocajuba	Pará	ITERPA	189	11.953,4934	11.953,4934	02/07/2013	
	Tijuca	Tijuca	Peri Mirim	Maranhão	ITERMA	140	2.447,9516	2.447,9516	30/12/2022	
	Tipitinga	Tipitinga	Santa Luzia do Pará	Pará	ITERPA	27	633,4357	633,4357	13/05/2008	
4	Trombetas	Bacabal, Aracuan de Cima, Aracuan do Meio, Aracuan de Baixo, Serrinha, Terra Preta II e Jarauacá	Oriximiná	Pará	ITERPA	138	80.887,0941	57.024,6216	20/11/1997	
4	Trombetas	Bacabal, Aracuan de Cima, Aracuan do Meio, Aracuan de Baixo, Serrinha, Terra Preta II e Jarauacá	Oriximiná	Pará	INCRA	138	80.887,0941	23.862,4725	20/11/1997	
	União São João	União São João	Prainha	Pará	ITERPA	48	1.806,8912	1.806,8912	19/11/2020	
	Uzina Velha	Uzina Velha	Caxias	Maranhão	ITERMA	76	1.160,9576	1.160,9576	01/09/2006	
	Vão das Palmeiras	Vão das Palmeiras	Seabra	Bahia	CDA	300	1.022,0150	1.022,0150	19/11/2014	
	Vaquejador	Vaquejador	Piripiri	Piauí	INTERPI	154	270,8841	270,8841	03/09/2021	
	Vazante	Vazante	Seabra	Bahia	CDA	45	2.495,4825	2.495,4825	27/06/2014	
	Vila Caeté	Vila Caeté	Abaetetuba andBarcarena	Pará	ITERPA	110	1.345,3062	1.345,3062	06/03/2018	
	Vila Cardoso	Vila Cardoso	Baião	Pará	ITERPA	324	1.121,2922	1.121,2922	06/11/2023	
239	Vila São João	Vila São João	Matias Olímpio and Campo Largo do Piauí	Piauí	INTERPI	53	2.346,8503	1.514,9075	20/06/2024	
239	Vila São João	Vila São João	Matias Olímpio and Campo Largo do Piauí	Piauí	INTERPI	53	2.346,8503	831,9428	20/06/2024	
	Vó Ernestina	Vó Ernestina	Morro Redondo	Rio Grande do Sul	PM of Morro Redondo	48	2,8553	2,8553	31/08/2022	
69	Volta do Campo Grande	Volta do Campo Grande, Retiro, Ponta do Morro, Capitãozinho, Vaca Brava, Serrote, Boca da Baixa e Emparedado	Campinas do Piauí	Piauí	INTERPI / INCRA	129	10.897,5945	10.897,5945	25/09/2007	
	Volta do Riacho	Volta do Riacho	Queimada Nova	Piauí	INTERPI	62	521,7395	521,7395	20/06/2024	

== Notes ==
=== Extraneous titles ===
quilombola land	Communities	County	State	Issuing body	Families	Claimed area (ha)	Title Size (ha)	Title date	Notes
Mocambo	Mocambo	Porto da Folha	Sergipe	FCP			2,100.5400	07/14/2000	The titles of these territories were issued by the FCP, which, however, did not register them with a notary's office nor carried out the removal of non-quilombola third parties. They were removed from the list to avoid double counting the titled area, since all these territories already were decreed for expropriation due to social interest and INCRA is obtaining the properties located in the territory and titling them in the name of the community.
Castainho	Castainho	Garanhuns	Pernambuco	FCP			183.6000	07/14/2000	The titles of these territories were issued by the FCP, which, however, did not register them with a notary's office nor carried out the removal of non-quilombola third parties. They were removed from the list to avoid double counting the titled area, since all these territories already were decreed for expropriation due to social interest and INCRA is obtaining the properties located in the territory and titling them in the name of the community.
Mangal and Barro Vermelho	Mangal and Barro Vermelho	Sítio do Mato	Bahia	FCP			7,615.1640	07/14/2000	The titles of these territories were issued by the FCP, which, however, did not register them with a notary's office nor carried out the removal of non-quilombola third parties. They were removed from the list to avoid double counting the titled area, since all these territories already were decreed for expropriation due to social interest and INCRA is obtaining the properties located in the territory and titling them in the name of the community.
Conceição das Crioulas	Conceição das Crioulas	Salgueiro	Pernambuco	FCP			16,865.0678	07/14/2000	The titles of these territories were issued by the FCP, which, however, did not register them with a notary's office nor carried out the removal of non-quilombola third parties. They were removed from the list to avoid double counting the titled area, since all these territories already were decreed for expropriation due to social interest and INCRA is obtaining the properties located in the territory and titling them in the name of the community.
Furnas da Boa Sorte	Furnas da Boa Sorte	Corguinho	Mato Grosso do Sul	FCP			1,402.3927	07/14/2000	The titles of these territories were issued by the FCP, which, however, did not register them with a notary's office nor carried out the removal of non-quilombola third parties. They were removed from the list to avoid double counting the titled area, since all these territories already were decreed for expropriation due to social interest and INCRA is obtaining the properties located in the territory and titling them in the name of the community.
Furnas do Dionísio	Furnas do Dionísio	Jaguari	Mato Grosso do Sul	FCP			1,031.8905	07/14/2000	The titles of these territories were issued by the FCP, which, however, did not register them with a notary's office nor carried out the removal of non-quilombola third parties. They were removed from the list to avoid double counting the titled area, since all these territories already were decreed for expropriation due to social interest and INCRA is obtaining the properties located in the territory and titling them in the name of the community.
Kalunga	Kalunga	Monte Alegre, Teresina de Goiás and Cavalcante	Goiás	FCP			253,191.7200	07/14/2000	The titles of these territories were issued by the FCP, which, however, did not register them with a notary's office nor carried out the removal of non-quilombola third parties. They were removed from the list to avoid double counting the titled area, since all these territories already were decreed for expropriation due to social interest and INCRA is obtaining the properties located in the territory and titling them in the name of the community.
Mata Cavalo	Mata Cavalo	Nossa Senhora do Livramento	Mato Grosso	FCP			11,722.4613	07/14/2000	The titles of these territories were issued by the FCP, which, however, did not register them with a notary's office nor carried out the removal of non-quilombola third parties. They were removed from the list to avoid double counting the titled area, since all these territories already were decreed for expropriation due to social interest and INCRA is obtaining the properties located in the territory and titling them in the name of the community.
Santana	Santana	Quatis	Rio de Janeiro	FCP			828,120	07/14/2000	The titles of these territories were issued by the FCP, which, however, did not register them with a notary's office nor carried out the removal of non-quilombola third parties. They were removed from the list to avoid double counting the titled area, since all these territories already were decreed for expropriation due to social interest and INCRA is obtaining the properties located in the territory and titling them in the name of the community.
Rio das Rãs		Bom Jesus da Lapa	Bahia	FCP			27,200	07/14/2000	Reason: The title of this territory was issued by FCP over the area of the Rio das Rãs II Settlement Project, created by INCRA in 1998, so it was not registered at a registry office. It was removed from the list to avoid counting the effectively untitled area.

=== Changes to borders ===
Islands of Abaetetuba, Alto Trombetas, Macapazinho, 2nd District and Porto Alegre, issued by ITERPA, had their areas rectified on 12/17/2010, respectively: from 11,458.5320 ha to 9,076.1909 ha; of 61,211.9578 ha for 79,095.5912 ha; from 68.7834 ha to 91.1505 ha; from 17,220.3792 ha to 15,073.2371 ha; and from 2,597.6260 ha to 2,858.7114 ha.

Erepecuru, issued by INCRA on 12/08/1998, had its area rectified, on 05/19/2016, from 57,584.8505 ha to 71,150.8867 ha.

=== Related preserves ===
Note: Extractive Reserve of Quilombo do Flexal had its land transformed into an extractive reserve, through Decree No. 536 of May 20, 1992. Therefore, it is not included in the land table as it is not owned of the quilombolas. An extractive reserve is a category of conservation unit, in the public domain with use granted to traditional extractive populations.
