= Campo Largo =

Campo Largo may refer to:

- Campo Largo, Chaco, Argentina
- Campo Largo, Paraná, Brazil
- Campo Largo do Piauí, Brazil
