= Entre Rios, Bahia =

Municipality of Bahia, Brazil

Entre Rios
- Municipality
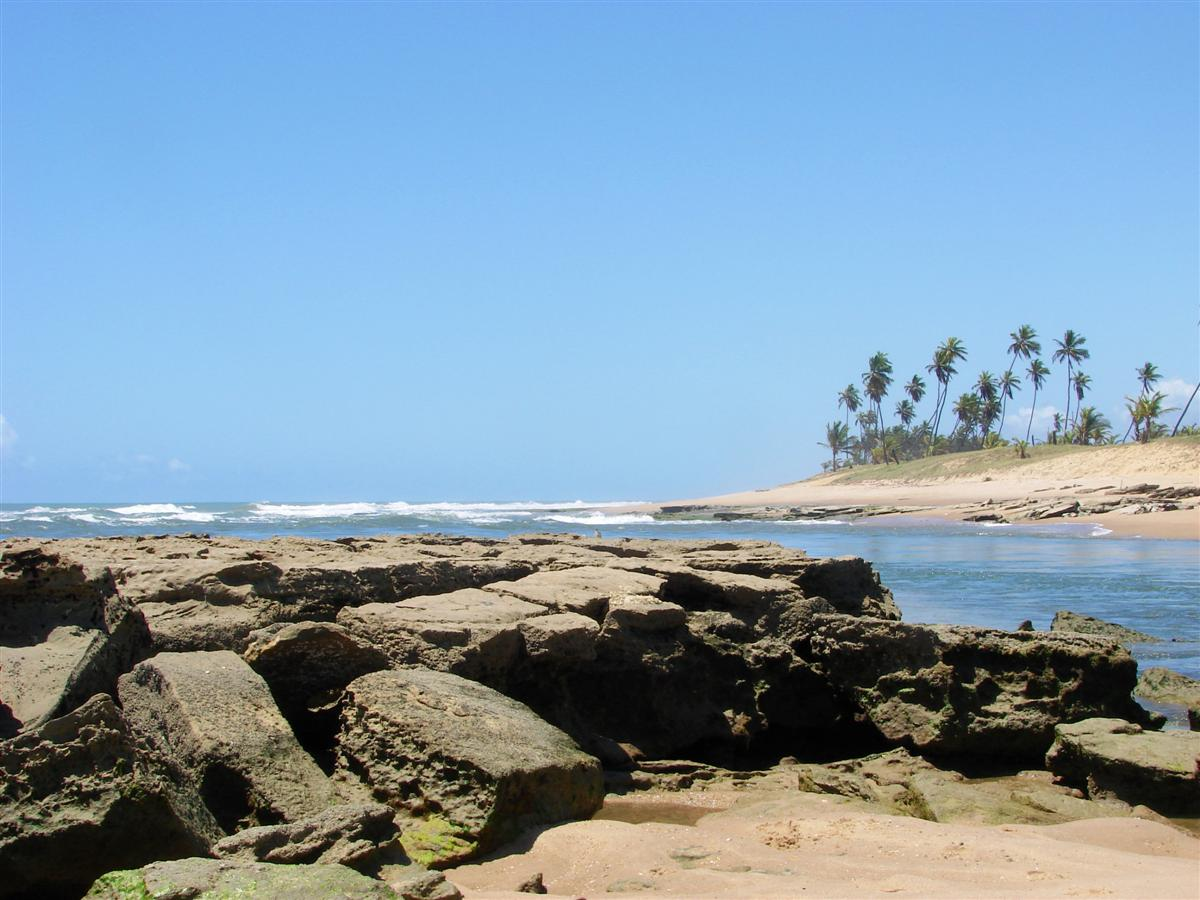
- Porto do Sauípe

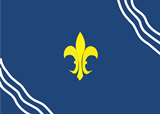
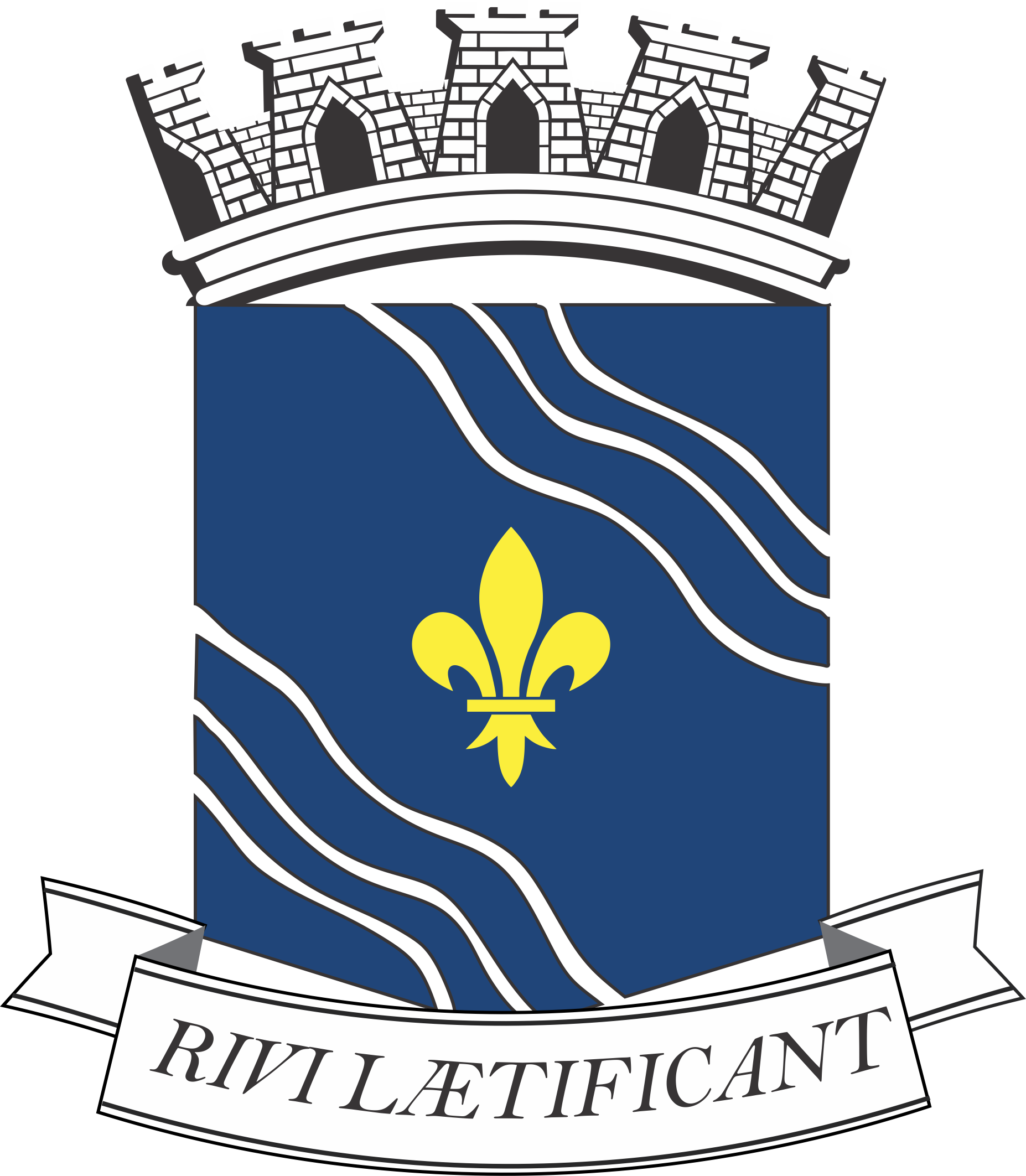
- Flag Coat of arms

- Location in Brazil
- Coordinates: 11°56′31″S 38°5′2″W
- Country: Brazil
- Region: Nordeste
- State: Bahia

Population (2022)
  - Total: 38,098
- Time zone: UTC−3 (BRT)

Entre Rios is a municipality in the state of Bahia. It is located in the North-East region of Brazil. In 2022, it had a population of 38,098. It is within the Brazil Time Zone (GMT-3).

== Culture ==
Entre Rios hosts several traditional festivities including the Lavagem das Praias (beach cleans) in Porto do Sauipe, Subaúma and Massarandupió, the Barquinha festival in Sítio do Meio and Lagoa Redonda, in addition to numerous patron saint festivals.

A local specialty dish is Arrumadinho, which consists of black-eyed peas, sun-dried or salted meat, toasted cassava flour, and a vinegar-based salad, typically served together in a plate or bowl. The dish is widely available in restaurants across the municipality.

== Roads ==
The city center can be accessed via the BR-101 highway towards Aracaju; the Linha Verde to Palame, where the BA-400 connects to Entre Rios; or via the BA-093 highway from Simões Filho.

== See also ==
- List of municipalities in Bahia
