= Caiana dos Crioulos =

Caiana dos Crioulos is a quilombola community located in the rural area of the municipality of Alagoa Grande, in the Brazilian state of Paraíba. In 2007, Caiana had 522 people, mostly children and teenagers, who lived off subsistence farming, such as cassava, yams, sweet potatoes, as well as animal husbandry and fruit growing.

The coco de roda, danced by cirandeiras, is still a relevant cultural manifestation of the place.

On October 5, 2018, Decree 9,521 approved the administrative demarcation of the territory of this community. Article 1 of the Decree stated: "The administrative demarcation promoted by the National Institute for Colonization and Agrarian Reform - Incra of the quilombola territory Caiana dos Crioulos, with an area of six hundred and forty-six hectares, fifty-eight ares and seventy-three centiares, located in the Municipalities of Alagoa Grande, Matinhas and Massaranduba, State of Paraíba, whose topographic coordinates were described in Process Incra/SR-18/PB/nº 54320.000416/2005-57, is hereby approved."

== History ==
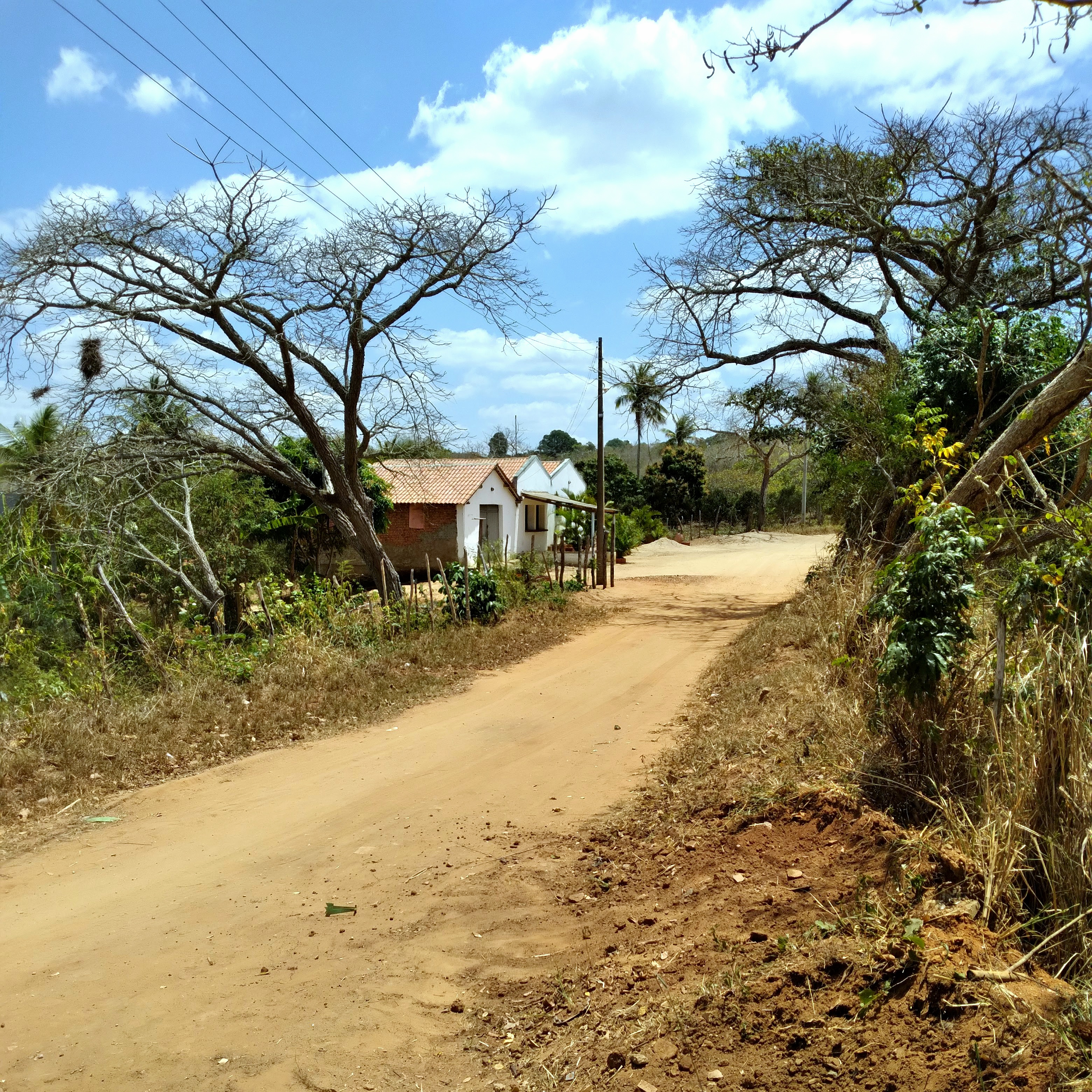
Dirt road in the Quilombola community of Caiana dos Crioulos

The quilombo, which is one of the cultural heritages of Paraíba, once had around two thousand inhabitants, direct descendants of slaves who settled there between the 17th and 19th centuries, supposedly coming from Mamanguape after a rebellion that occurred on a ship that docked in Baía da Traição during that period.

More than ninety percent of its inhabitants have African ancestry, which, along with the local historiography, made it possible for the community to be recognized in May 2005 by the Palmares Cultural Foundation as one of the thirteen legitimate Brazilian quilombos.

On November 20, 2016, Black Consciousness Day, the documentary "Caiana dos Crioulos Opens its Doors," produced by journalist Caio César Beltrão and photographer Flávio Monteiro, was released. The production presents a historical, human, and social overview of the trajectory of the Black population in Brejo da Paraíba, featuring figures such as Margarida Maria Alves and Jackson do Pandeiro, and concluding with a portrait of the quilombola community from a contemporary perspective.

The book Jackson do Pandeiro: o rei do ritmo (Jackson do Pandeiro: the king of rhythm) discusses the growing decline of African heritage among the inhabitants of Caiana, saying:

Of controversial origin, but indisputable ethnicity, the black people of Caiana have been losing almost all the cultural traits of the past over the years, starting with the invasion of television antennas and telephone wires. But, until two or three decades ago, its inhabitants dressed in colorful clothes, predominantly red, shocking pink and golden yellow. White scarves and turbans completed the typical African attire. Shy, silent and distrustful to this day, the Creoles have had in music their main link of integration with the inhabitants of the city (...)

Although it is only 122 km from João Pessoa, the community still remains a world apart. Its instruments, music, dances and customs still retain something of its ancestry and history. Two other versions, however, suggest that Caiana originated from blacks who escaped from Palmares or from abolished slaves from Areia, freed before the Golden Law.
