= Massaranduba =

Massaranduba may refer to:

== Nature ==
- Manilkara bidentata - one of the common names for a species of Manilkara tree based in northern South America, Central America and the Caribbean.

== Places ==
- Massaranduba, Paraíba - a municipality in the state of Paraíba in the Northeast Region of Brazil.
- Massaranduba, Santa Catarina - a municipality in the state of Santa Catarina in the South region of Brazil.

== People ==
- Francisco Trinaldo, also known as Massaranduba - a Brazilian mixed martial artist.
