= Assunção do Piauí =

Coordinates: 5.86389°S 41.0489°W

- Municipality
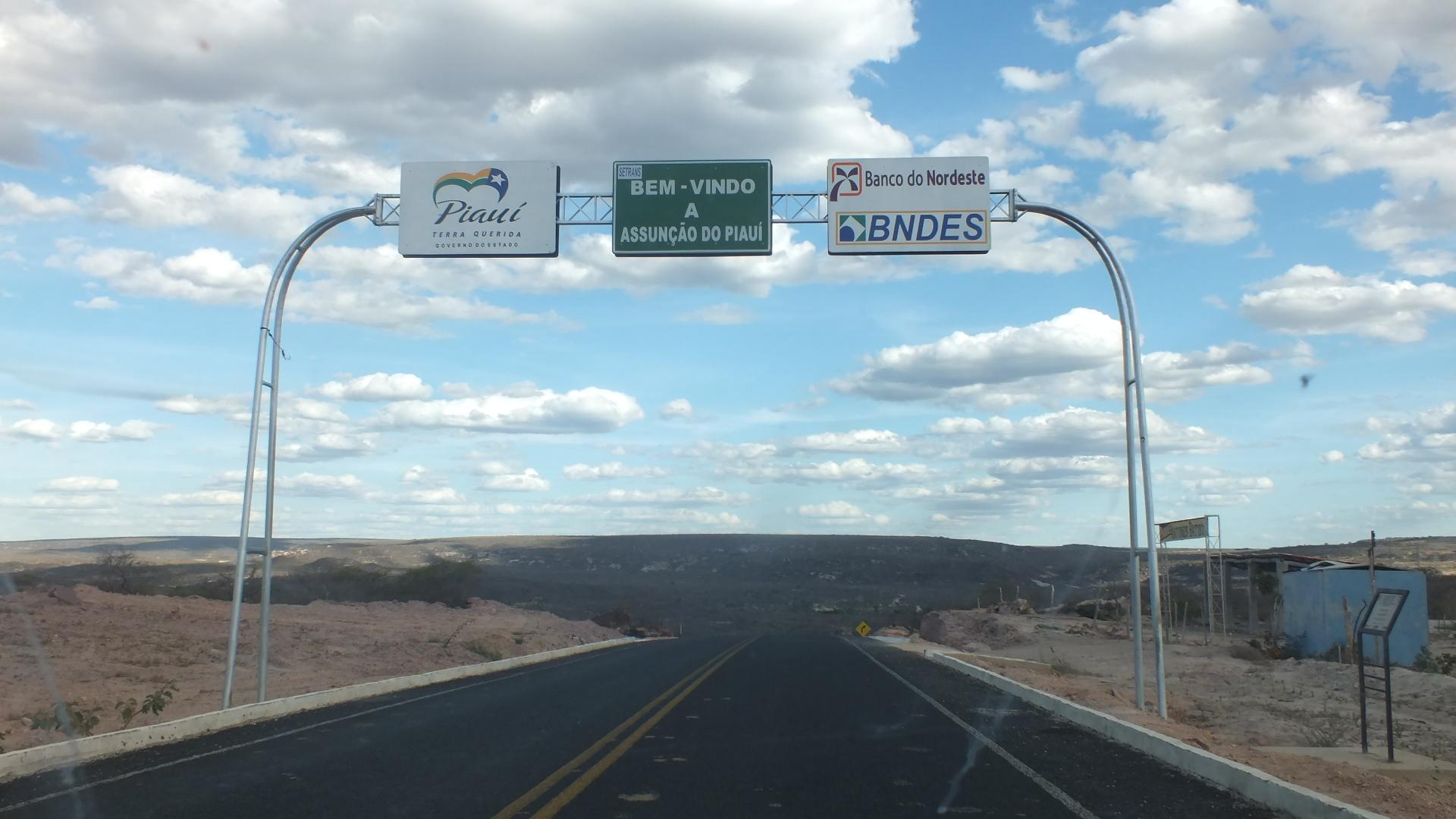

- Flag

- Country: Brazil
- Region: Northeast
- State: Piauí
- Mesoregion: Centro-Norte Piauiense

Population (2020)
  - Total: 7,863
- Time zone: UTC−3 (BRT)

Assunção do Piauí is a municipality in the state of Piauí in the Northeast region of Brazil.

== See also ==
- List of municipalities in Piauí
