= Salitre, Ceará =

Municipality in Ceará, Brazil

Coordinates: 7°17′02″S 40°27′38″W

Salitre
- Municipality
- The Municipality of Salitre
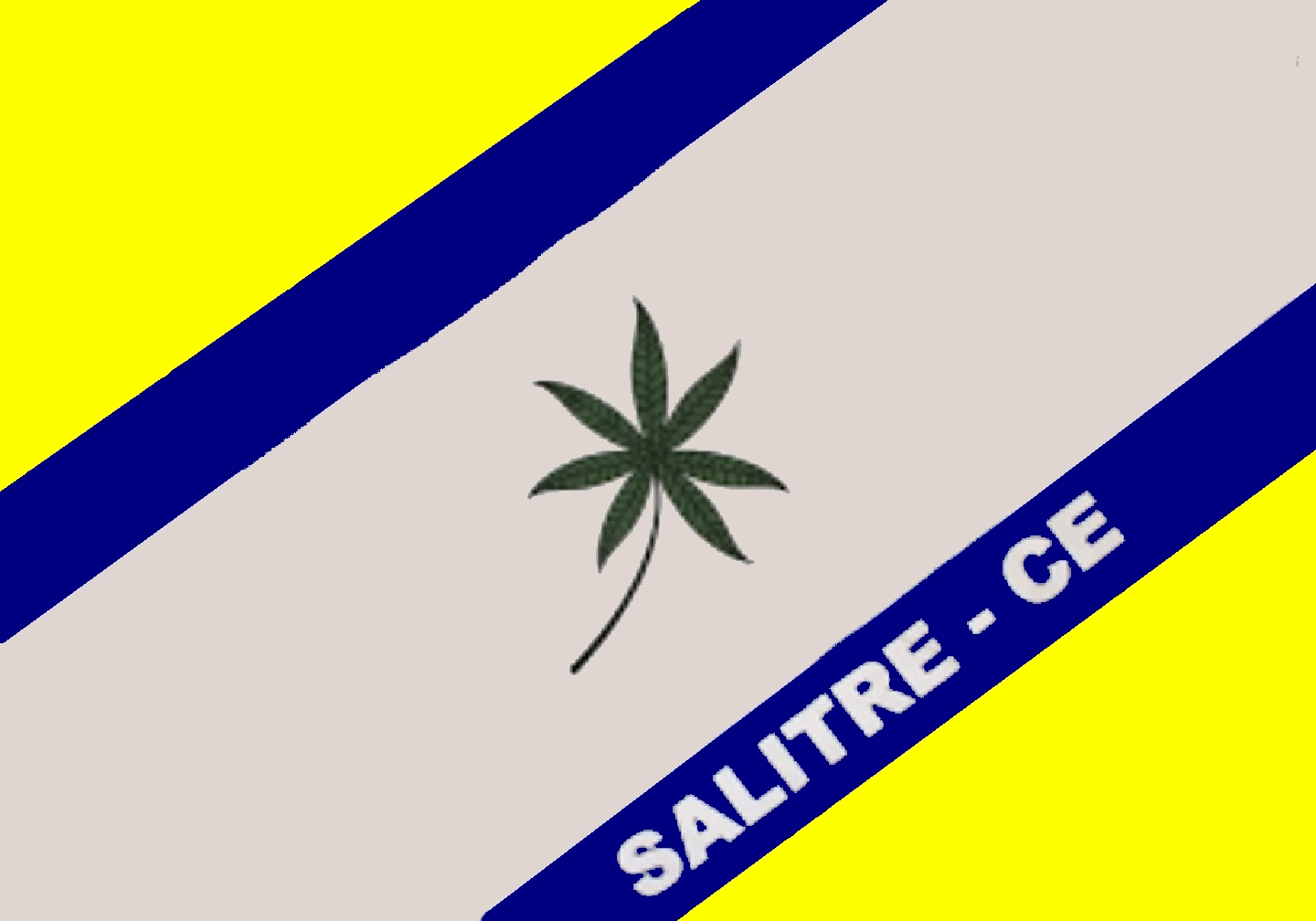
- Flag

- Location of Salitre in the State of Ceará
- Country: Brazil
- Region: Northeast
- State: Ceará
- Founded: June 30, 1988

Government
  - Mayor: Rondilson de Alencar Ribeiro (PT)

Area
  - Total: 899.824 km^{2} (347.424 sq mi)
- Elevation: 230 m (740 ft)

Population (2024)
  - Total: 17,220
  - Density: 19.14/km^{2} (49.56/sq mi)
- Time zone: UTC−3 (BRT)
- HDI (2000): 0.558 – medium
- Website: www.Salitre.ce.gov.br

Salitre is a municipality of the Northeastern state of Ceará in Brazil. It is located in the southwest corner of the state, being the only municipality to have boundaries with both Piauí and Bahia states.
