= Seabra =

Seabra, Chapada Diamantina
- Municipality
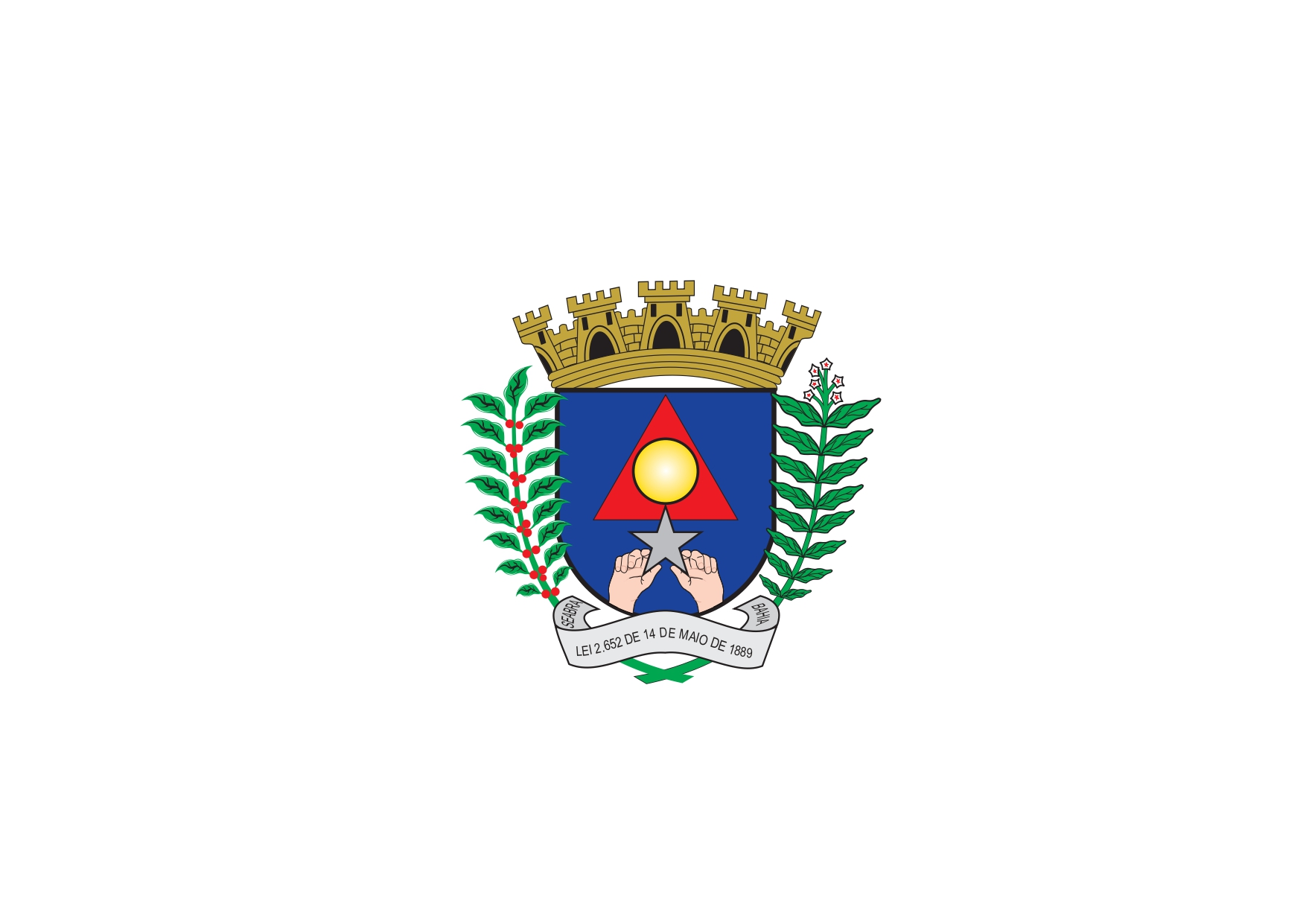
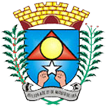
- Flag Coat of arms

- Location in Brazil
- Coordinates: 12.4189°S 41.77°W
- Country: Brazil
- Region: Nordeste
- State: Bahia

Population (2020)
  - Total: 44,234
- Time zone: UTC−3 (BRT)

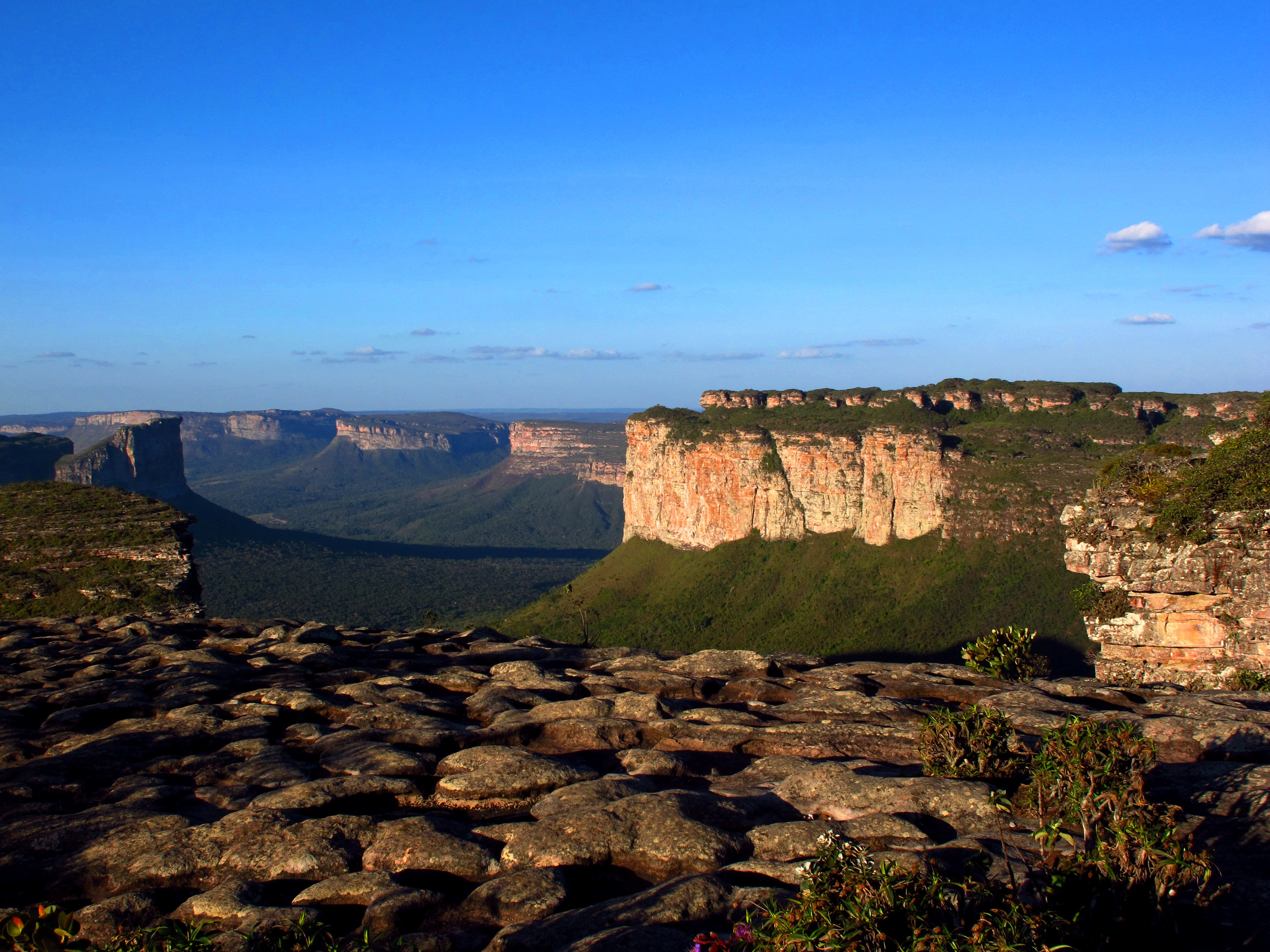
Seabra is a city of Chapada Diamantina.

Seabra is a municipality in the state of Bahia in the North-East region of Brazil.

== See also ==
- List of municipalities in Bahia
