= Boninal =

Municipality of Bahia, Brazil

- Municipality
- Flag

- Location in Brazil
- Coordinates: 12°42′S 41°50′W
- Country: Brazil
- Region: Nordeste
- State: Bahia

Population (2020)
  - Total: 14,446
- Time zone: UTC−3 (BRT)

Boninal is a municipality in the state of Bahia in the North-East region of Brazil.

== See also ==
- List of municipalities in Bahia
