= Campinas do Piauí =

Coordinates: 7°39′S 41°52′W

- Municipality
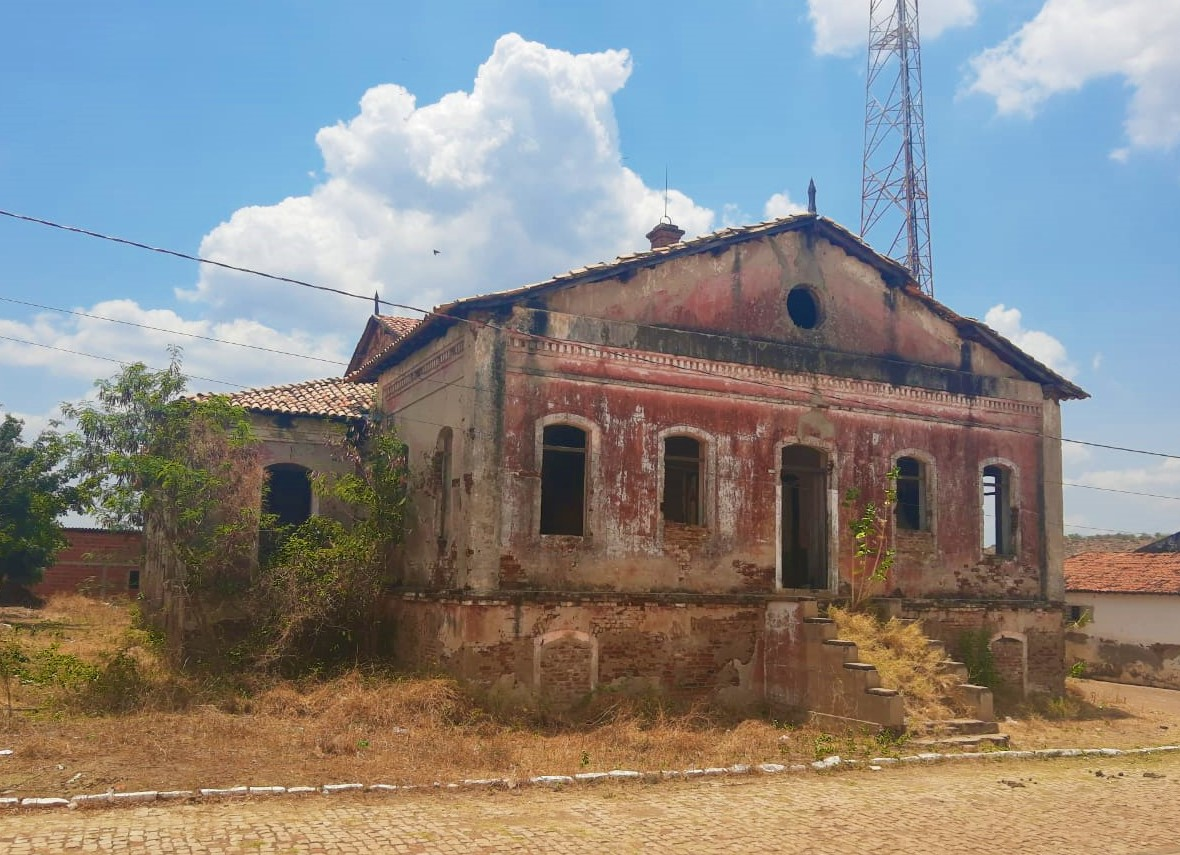

- Country: Brazil
- Region: Nordeste
- State: Piauí
- Mesoregion: Sudeste Piauiense

Population (2020)
  - Total: 5,620
- Time zone: UTC−3 (BRT)

Campinas do Piauí is a municipality in the state of Piauí in the Northeast region of Brazil.

== See also ==
- List of municipalities in Piauí
