= Queimada Nova =

Coordinates: 8.57889°S 41.4189°W

- Municipality
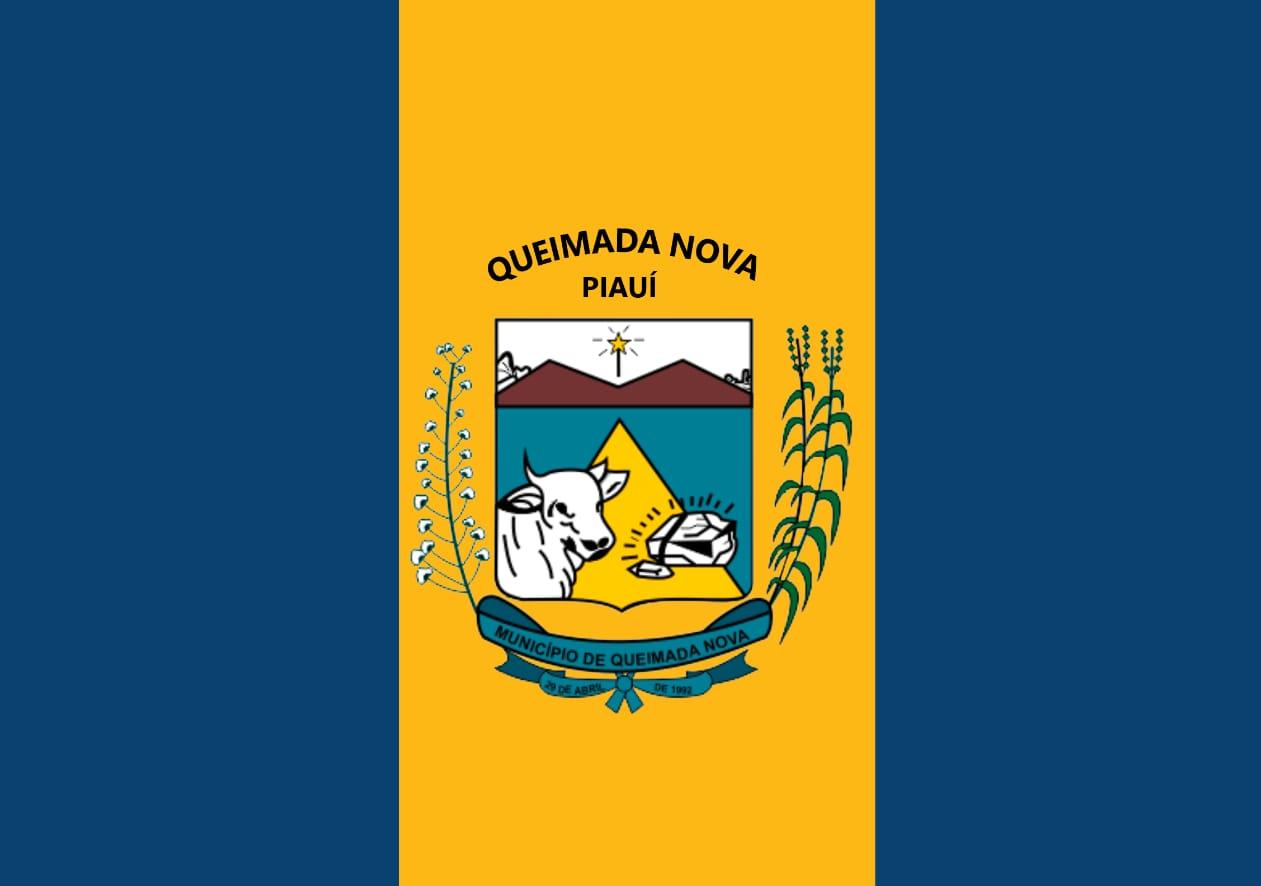
- Flag

- Country: Brazil
- Region: Nordeste
- State: Piauí
- Mesoregion: Sudeste Piauiense

Population (2020)
  - Total: 9,017
- Time zone: UTC−3 (BRT)

Queimada Nova is a municipality in the state of Piauí in the Northeast region of Brazil.

The municipality was designated a priority area for conservation and sustainable use when the Caatinga Ecological Corridor was created in 2006.

== See also ==
- List of municipalities in Piauí
