= Reserva do Iguaçu =

Coordinates: 25.8389°S 52.0278°W

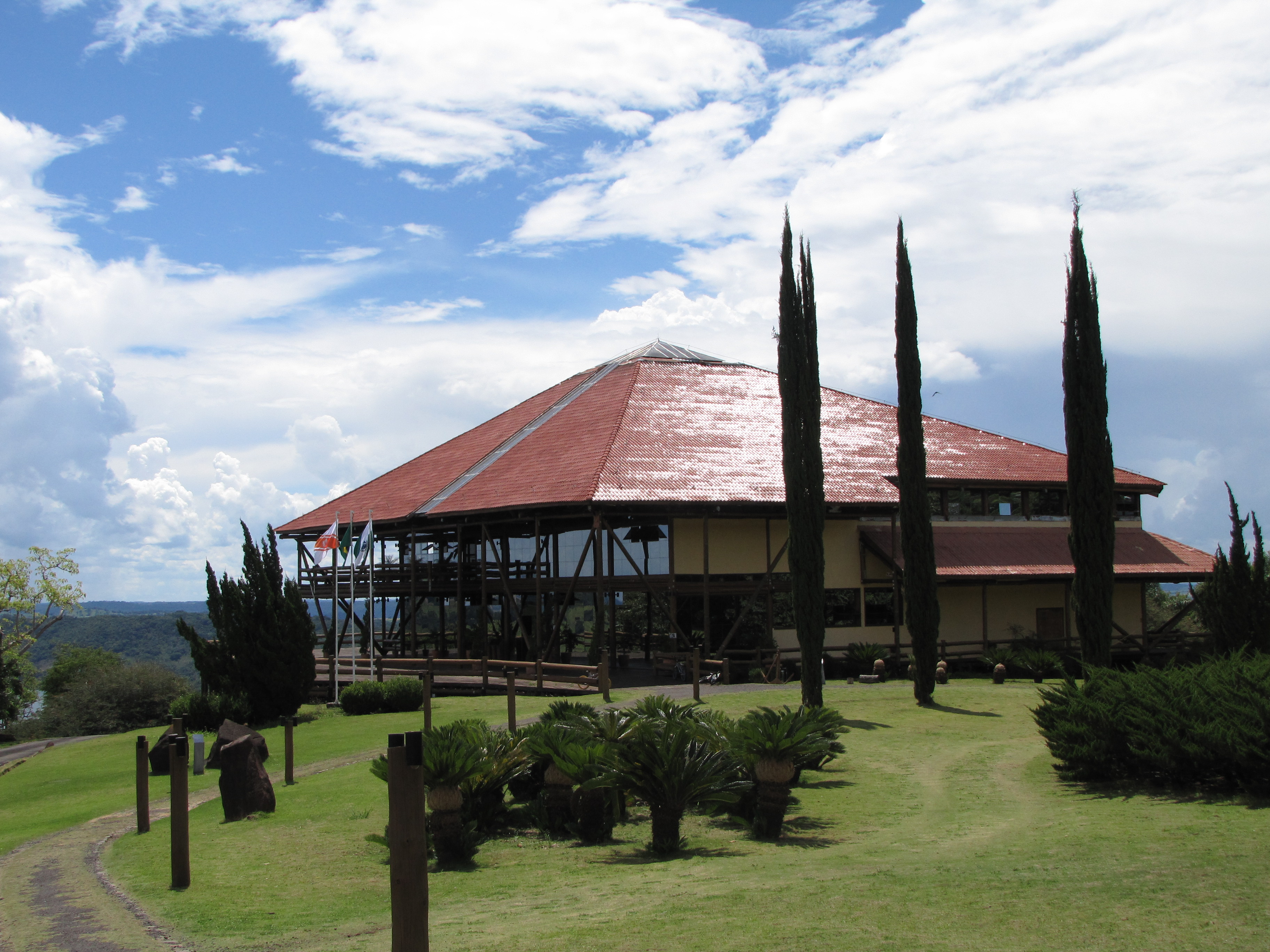

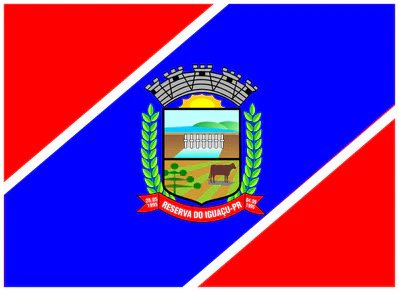
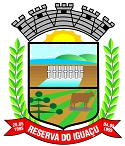
- Flag Coat of arms

- Location of Reserva do Iguaçu
- Country: Brazil
- Region: Sul
- State: Paraná

Population (2020)
  - Total: 8,069
- Time zone: UTC−3 (BRT)

Reserva do Iguaçu is a Brazilian municipality in the state of Paraná. Main industries include agriculture, cattle and woodworks. There is also a government hydroelectric plant called Ney Braga (Hydroelectric Plant of Secret) in the city.

The city also has three important tourist attractions – the Regional Museum of the Iguaçu, the House of Rock (large house of the Fiat), and the Sanctuary of Passo of the Reserve.

== See also ==
- List of municipalities in Paraná
