= Campo Largo do Piauí =

- Municipality

- Location in Brazil
- Coordinates: 3.81194°S 42.6289°W
- Country: Brazil
- Region: Nordeste
- State: Piauí
- Mesoregion: Norte Piauiense

Population (2020)
  - Total: 7,311
- Time zone: UTC−3 (BRT)

Campo Largo do Piauí is a municipality in the state of Piauí in the Northeast region of Brazil.

== See also ==
- List of municipalities in Piauí
