= Sítio do Mato =

Sítio do Mato Município de Sítio do Mato
- Municipality
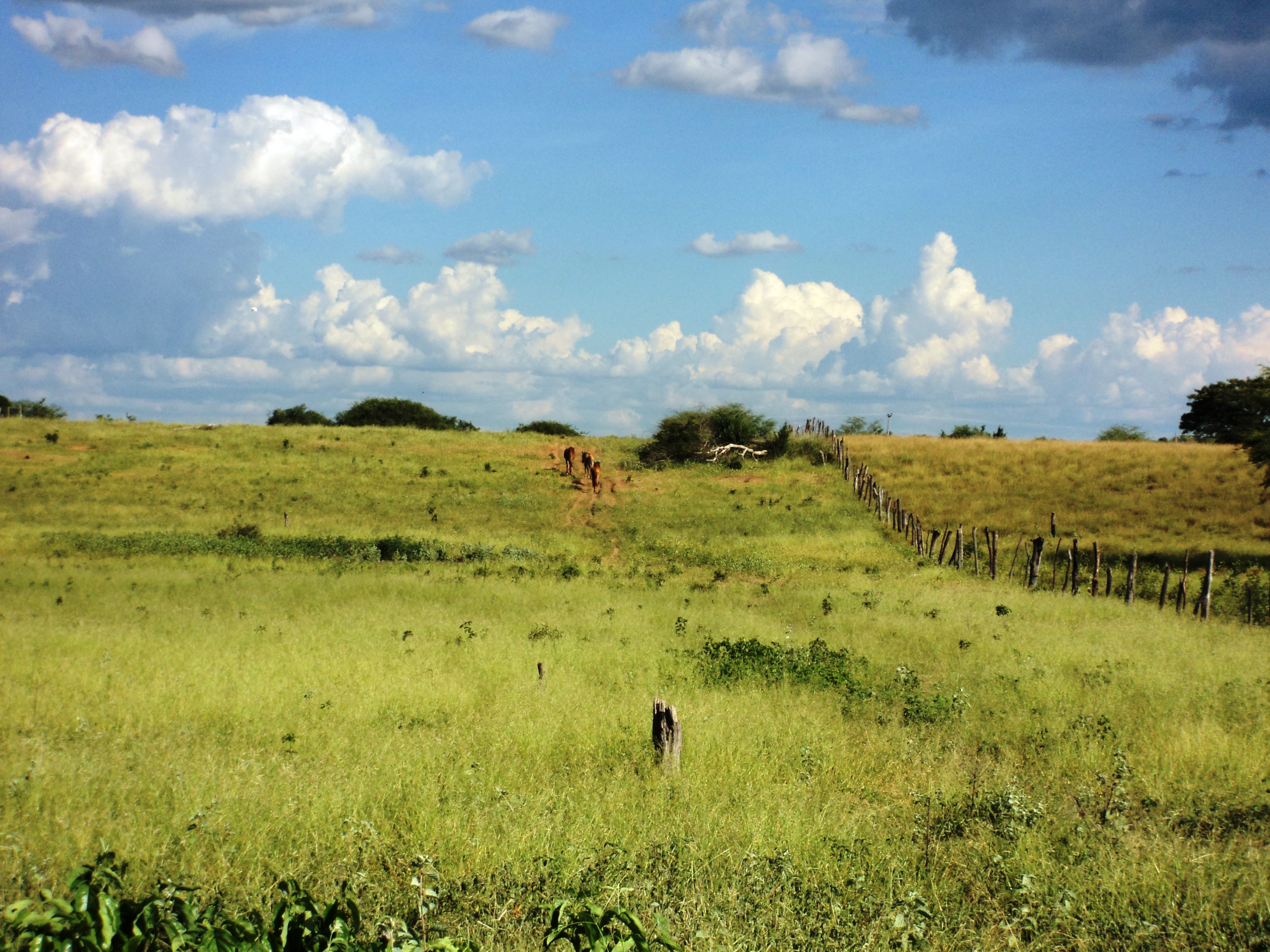
- Vegetation in Sítio do Mato, Bahia

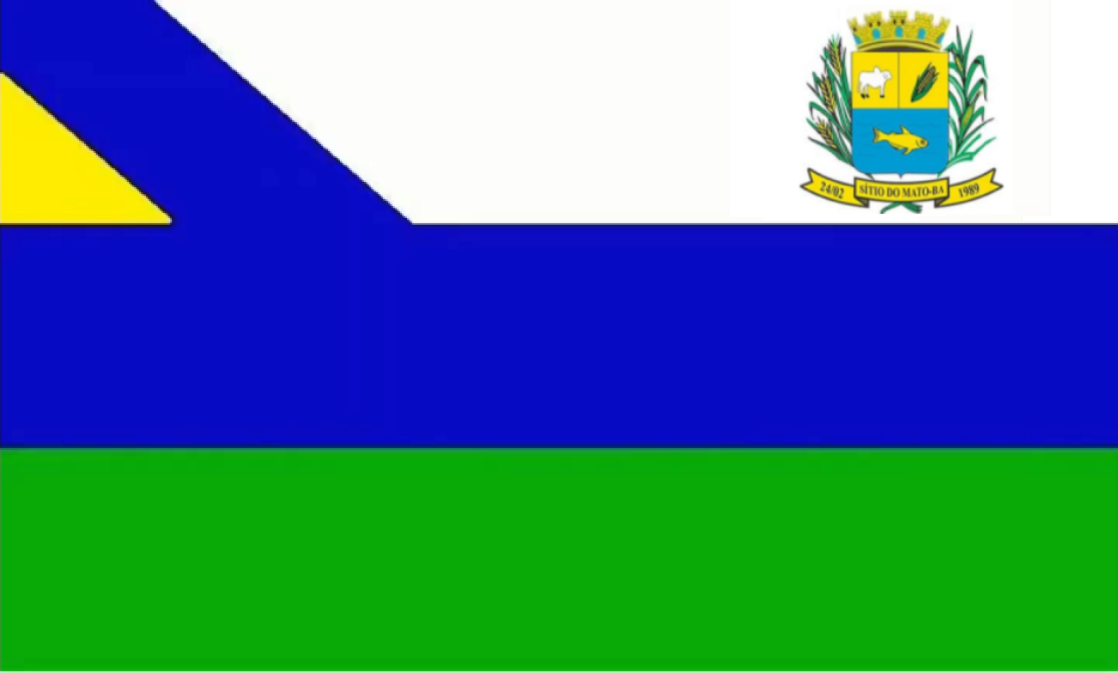
- Flag

- Location of Sítio do Mato in Bahia

- Location of Sítio do Mato in Brazil
- Coordinates: 13°05′06″S 43°27′54″W
- Country: Brazil
- Region: Northeast
- State: Bahia
- Established: February 24, 1989

Government
  - Mayor: Alfredo de Oliveira Magalhaes Junior

Area
  - Total: 1,627.776 km^{2} (628.488 sq mi)
- Elevation: 428 m (1,404 ft)

Population (2020)
  - Total: 13,059
  - Density: 8.0226/km^{2} (20.778/sq mi)
- Demonym: Sítio-matense
- Time zone: UTC−3 (BRT)

Sítio do Mato is a municipality in the state of Bahia in the North-East region of Brazil. Sítio do Mato covers 1,627.776 km^{2} (628.488 mi^{2}), and has a population of 13,059 with a population density of 8.1 inhabitants per square kilometer.

== See also ==
- List of municipalities in Bahia
