= Matinhas =

Coordinates: 7.125°S 35.7669°W

- Municipality
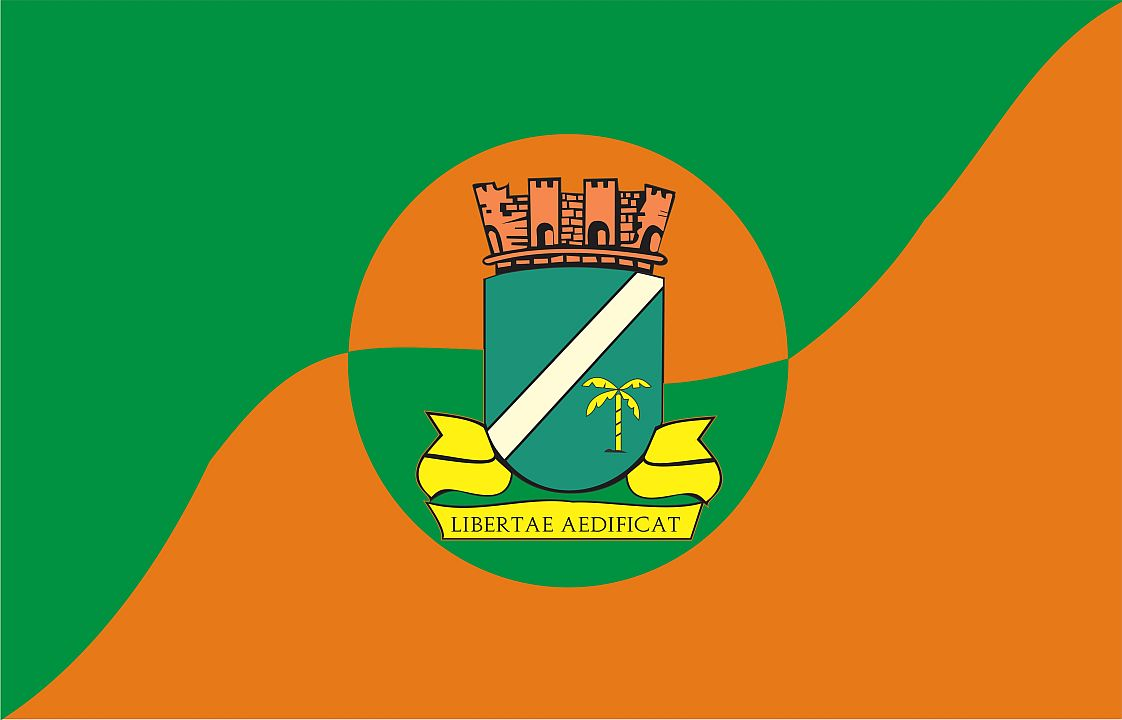
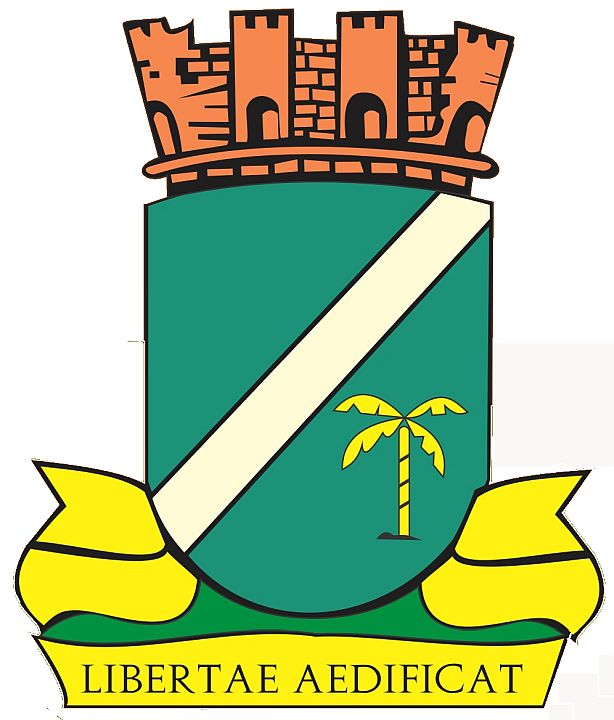
- Flag Coat of arms

- Country: Brazil
- Region: Northeast
- State: Paraíba
- Mesoregion: Agreste Paraibano

Population (2020)
  - Total: 4,515
- Time zone: UTC−3 (BRT)

Matinhas (Central northeastern portuguese pronunciation: [mɐˈtĩj̃ɐ]) is a municipality in the state of Paraíba in the Northeast Region of Brazil.

== See also ==
- List of municipalities in Paraíba
