= Massaranduba, Paraíba =

Coordinates: 7°12′00″S 35°47′20″W

Massaranduba
- Municipality
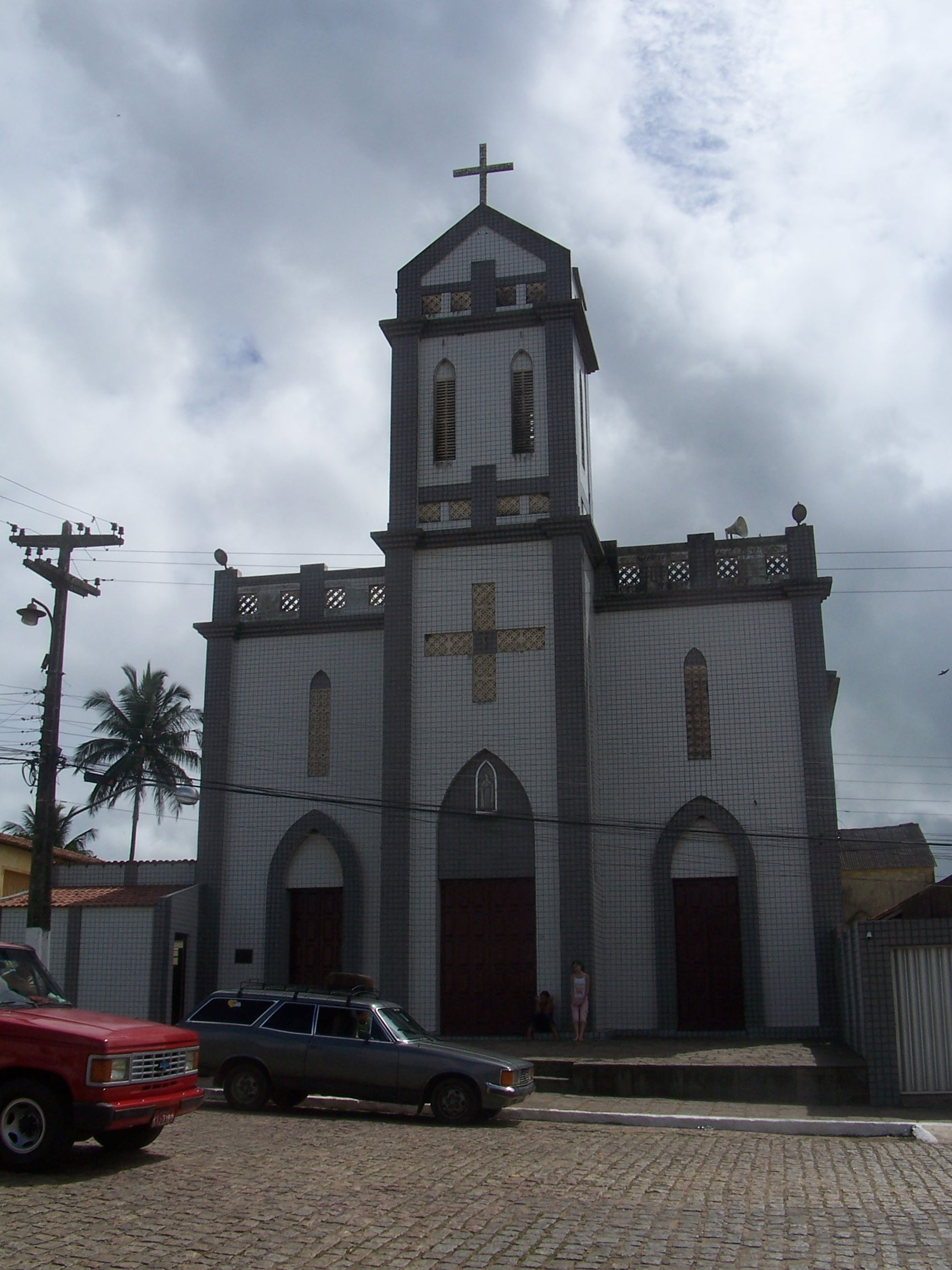
- Church of Saint Thérèse of the Child Jesus and the Holy Face

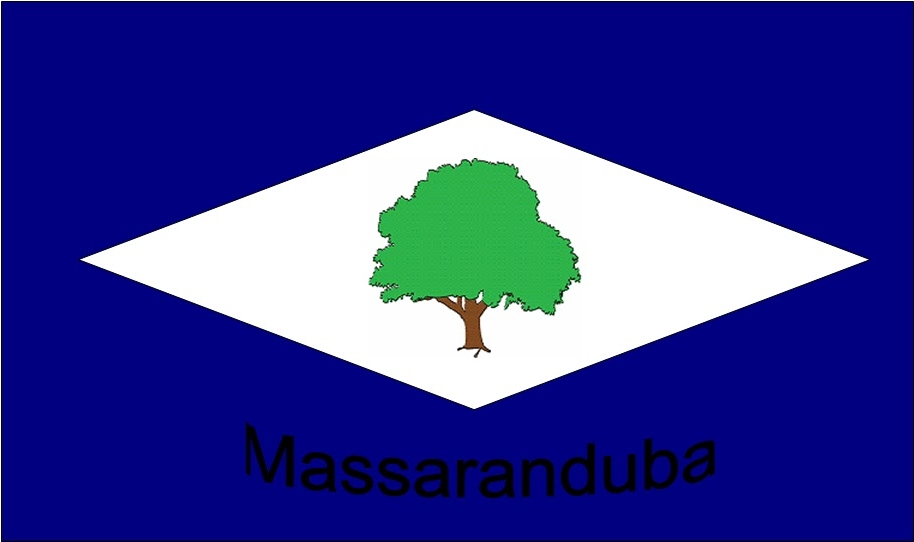
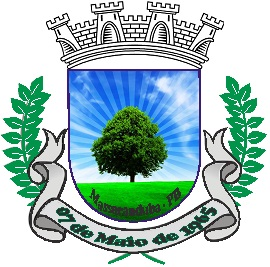
- Flag Coat of arms
- Nickname: Massara
- Location of Massaranduba in Brazil
- Country: Brazil
- Region: Northeast
- State: Paraíba
- Mesoregion: Agreste Paraibano
- Incorporated (as city): 1965

Government
  - Mayor: Paulo Francinette de Oliveira

Area
  - Total: 79,520 sq mi (205,956 km^{2})
- Elevation: 1,775 ft (541 m)

Population (2020)
  - Total: 13,998
  - Density: 162.2/sq mi (62.64/km^{2})
- Demonym: massarandubense or maçarandubense
- Time zone: UTC−3 (BRT)
- Postal Code: 58120-000
- Area code: +55 83
- Website: massaranduba.pb.gov.br (in Portuguese)

Massaranduba (Central northeastern portuguese pronunciation: [mɐsɐɾɐ̃ˈdubɐ]) is a municipality in the state of Paraíba in the Northeast Region of Brazil.

== See also ==
- List of municipalities in Paraíba
